= Dottie West albums discography =

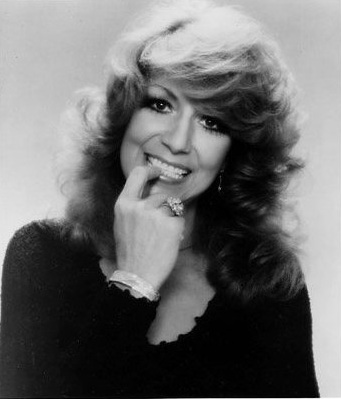
- Compilation albums: 18
- Solo studio albums: 28
- Collaborative studio albums: 5
- Other album appearances: 1

The albums discography of American country artist Dottie West contains 28 studio albums as a solo artist, five studio albums as a collaborative artist, 18 compilation albums and additional album appearance. Among West's studio releases were five collaborative albums with various artists, including Kenny Rogers. After signing with RCA Victor Records in 1963, West released her debut studio album Here Comes My Baby (1965). The album peaked at number 12 on the Billboard Top Country Albums chart in July 1965. West's third studio album Suffer Time (1966) spawned four singles, including "Would You Hold It Against Me", a top 5 hit on the Billboard Hot Country Songs chart. Suffer Time would reach number 3 on the country albums chart, West's highest-charting solo album. Between 1967 and 1968, West released 5 more studio albums. With All My Heart and Soul (1967) featured the top 10 hit "Paper Mansions" and the album itself peaked at number 8 on the Top Country Albums list. In 1969, she paired with Don Gibson for her first collaborative project Dottie and Don. The album featured the pair's number 2 Billboard country hit "Rings of Gold". In 1970, she collaborated with Jimmy Dean on the studio release Country Boy and Country Girl. In 1973, West had her biggest hit with the single "Country Sunshine". Its corresponding album of the same name peaked at number 17 on the country album chart in February 1974.

After the release of several albums and singles, West collaborated with Kenny Rogers on "Every Time Two Fools Collide" (1978), which reached number 1 on the Billboard Hot Country Singles chart. A collaborative album of the same name peaked at number 1 on the Billboard country albums chart, West's highest-charting album. The pair's second studio album Classics was released in 1979, peaking at number 3 on the country albums chart. West's solo career became more successful during this period. Her solo studio album Special Delivery (1980) reached number 13 on the Billboard country albums survey. Wild West (1981) peaked at number 5 on the country albums chart and number 126 on the Billboard 200. Between 1982 and 1983, West released three more studio albums. In 1984, she issued her final studio album on Permian Records entitled Just Dottie.

== Studio albums ==
=== As a solo artist ===
List of albums, with selected chart positions, showing year released and album name
Title	Album details	Peak chart positions	
Title	Album details	US	US Cou.
Here Comes My Baby	Released: June 1965; Label: RCA Victor; Formats: LP	—	12
Dottie West Sings	Released: December 1965; Label: RCA Victor; Formats: LP	—	12
Suffer Time	Released: July 1966; Label: RCA Victor; Formats: LP	—	3
With All My Heart and Soul	Released: January 1967; Label: RCA Victor; Formats: LP	—	8
Dottie West Sings Sacred Ballads	Released: July 1967; Label: RCA Victor; Formats: LP	—	—
I'll Help You Forget Her	Released: November 1967; Label: RCA Victor; Formats: LP	—	11
What I'm Cut Out to Be	Released: March 1968; Label: RCA Victor; Formats: LP	—	18
Country Girl	Released: August 1968; Label: RCA Victor; Formats: LP	—	18
Feminine Fancy	Released: December 1968; Label: RCA Victor; Formats: LP	—	39
Dottie Sings Eddy	Released: May 1969; Label: RCA Victor; Formats: LPVinyl	—	—
Makin' Memories	Released: December 1969; Label: RCA Victor; Formats: LP	—	—
Country and West	Released: May 1970; Label: RCA Victor; Formats: LP	—	—
Forever Yours	Released: October 1970; Label: RCA Victor; Formats: LP	—	40
Careless Hands	Released: March 1971; Label: RCA Victor; Formats: LP	—	—
Have You Heard...Dottie West	Released: October 1971; Label: RCA Victor; Formats: LP	—	—
I'm Only a Woman	Released: May 1972; Label: RCA Victor; Formats: LP	—	—
If It's All Right with You/Just What I've Been Looking For	Released: May 1973; Label: RCA Victor; Formats: LP	—	37
Country Sunshine	Released: November 1973; Label: RCA Victor; Formats: LP	—	17
House of Love	Released: May 1974; Label: RCA Victor; Formats: LP	—	—
Carolina Cousins	Released: May 1975; Label: RCA Victor; Formats: LP	—	45
When It's Just You and Me	Released: July 1977; Label: United Artists; Formats: LP	—	44
Dottie	Released: August 1978; Label: United Artists; Formats: LP, cassette	—	47
Special Delivery	Released: November 1979; Label: Liberty/United Artists; Formats: LP, cassette	—	13
Wild West	Released: February 1981; Label: Liberty; Formats: LP, cassette	126	5
High Times	Released: November 1981; Label: Liberty; Formats: LP, cassette	—	43
Full Circle	Released: September 1982; Label: Liberty; Formats: LP, cassette	—	—
New Horizons	Released: July 1983; Label: Liberty; Formats: LP, cassette	—	65
Just Dottie	Released: October 1984; Label: Permian; Formats: LP, cassette	—	—
"—" denotes a recording that did not chart or was not released in that territory.

=== As a collaborative artist ===
List of albums, with selected chart positions and certifications, showing year released and album name
Title	Album details	Peak chart positions			Certifications
Title	Album details	US	US Cou.	CAN	Certifications
The Sound of Country Music (with The Heartaches)	Released: February 1967; Label: RCA Camden; Formats: LP	—	—	—	
Dottie and Don (with Don Gibson)	Released: March 1969; Label: RCA Victor; Formats: LP	—	21	—	
Country Boy and Country Girl (with Jimmy Dean)	Released: November 1970; Label: RCA Victor; Formats: LP	—	42	—	
Every Time Two Fools Collide (with Kenny Rogers)	Released: March 1978; Label: United Artists; Formats: LP	186	1	95	RIAA: Gold
Classics (with Kenny Rogers)	Released: March 1979; Label: United Artists; Formats: LP	82	3	60	RIAA: Platinum
"—" denotes a recording that did not chart or was not released in that territory.

== Compilation albums ==
List of albums, with selected chart positions, showing year released and album name
Title	Album details	Peak chart positions
Title	Album details	US Country
The Country Girl Singing Sensation	Released: 1964; Label: Starday; Formats: LP	—
Queens of Country Music (with Melba Montgomery)	Released: 1965; Label: Starday; Formats: LP	—
I Fall to Pieces	Released: 1967; Label: Nashville; Formats: LP	—
A Legend in My Time	Released: February 1971; Label: RCA Camden; Formats: LP	—
The Best of Dottie West	Released: December 1972; Label: RCA Victor; Formats: LP	—
Would You Hold It Against Me	Released: 1973; Label: RCA Camden; Formats: LP	—
Loving You	Released: 1974; Label: RCA Camden; Formats: LP	—
Once You Were Mine	Released: August 1980; Label: RCA Victor; Formats: LP	50
Country Ladies (with Kim Carnes, Anne Murray and Juice Newton)	Released: 1982; Label: Liberty; Formats: LP	—
The Best of Dottie West	Released: 1984; Label: Liberty; Formats: LP, cassette	—
Collector's Series	Released: 1984; Label: RCA; Formats: LP, cassette	—
20 of the Best	Released: 1986; Label: RCA; Formats: LP	—
Dottie West	Released: 1992; Label: BMG; Formats: CD	—
Greatest Hits	Released: 1992; Label: Curb; Formats: Cassette, CD	—
The Essential Dottie West	Released: 1996; Label: RCA; Formats: Cassette, CD	—
Are You Happy Baby: The Collection	Released: November 18, 1997; Label: Razor & Tie; Formats: CD	—
RCA Country Legends	Released: 2001; Label: Buddah/RCA; Formats: CD	—
The Best of Dottie West	Released: August 17, 2018; Label: Capitol Nashville; Formats: Digital	—
"—" denotes a recording that did not chart or was not released in that territory.

== Other album appearances ==
List of non-single guest appearances, showing year released and album name
Title	Year	Other artist(s)	Album	Ref.
"As for Me"	1990	Arne Benoni	As for Me	
