= List of awards and nominations received by Dottie West =

Dottie West awards and nominations
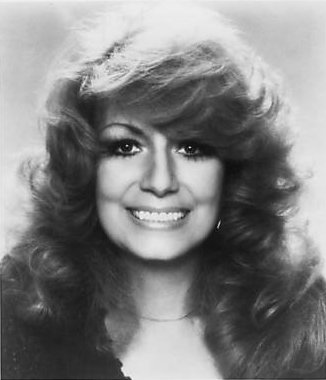
Awards and nominations
Award	Wins	Nominations
Country Music Association	3	10
Grammy Awards	1	15

American country singer and songwriter Dottie West has been awarded during her lifetime and posthumously. Among her first accolades was from the Grammy Awards in 1965 when she won the accolade for Best Female Country Vocal Performance. West was subsequently nominated by the Grammy's 15 more times through 1982. This included six more nominations for Best Female Country Vocal Performance and four nominations for Best Country Performance by a Duo or Group with Vocal. She also received various nominations from Billboard, Cashbox and Record World magazines. This included three during the 1970s from Billboard.

West has been awarded for her work as a songwriter. This included being given the 1974 Clio award for "Country Sunshine", a song that she wrote originally as a commercial. For her work with Kenny Rogers, West was nominated for a series of accolades by several associations. In 1978 and 1979, the pair won two back-to-back Vocal Group of the Year awards from the Country Music Association. West was also given other honors. This included a membership to the Grand Ole Opry in 1964 and induction into the Country Music Hall of Fame and Museum in 2018.

== Academy of Country Music Awards ==
Year	Nominee / work	Award	Result	Ref.
1977	Dottie West	Career Achievement Award	Nominated	
1978	Kenny Rogers and Dottie West	Top Vocal Group	Nominated	
1978	Every Time Two Fools Collide (with Kenny Rogers)	Album of the Year	Nominated	
1983	Dottie West	Top Female Vocalist of the Year	Nominated	

== American Music Awards ==
Year	Nominee / work	Award	Result	Ref.
1980	Kenny Rogers and Dottie West	Favorite Country Band/Duo/Group	Nominated	

== Billboard Magazine Awards ==
Year	Nominee / work	Award	Result	Ref.
1965	Dottie West	Favorite Female Artist	Nominated	
1966	Dottie West	Favorite Female Performer	Nominated	
1973	Dottie West	Billboard International Award for Top U.S. Female Artist	Won	
1974	Dottie West	Best Female Songwriter	Won	
1974	Dottie West	International Award for Best Female Singer	Won	
1979	Kenny Rogers and Dottie West	Top Album Artists	Nominated	
1979	Kenny Rogers and Dottie West	Top Duo or Group Album Artists	Nominated	
1980	Dottie West	Top Female Artist	Nominated	
1980	Dottie West	Top Singles Artists	Nominated	

== Cashbox Magazine Awards ==
Year	Nominee / work	Award	Result	Ref.
1964	"Here Comes My Baby"	Best Country Records of 1964	Nominated	
1964	Dottie West	Top New Female Vocalist	Nominated	
1966	Dottie West	Top Female Vocalist	Nominated	
1966	Dottie West	Top Female LP Vocalists	Nominated	
1971	Dottie West	Top Female Vocalist	Nominated	
1974	Dottie West	Top Female Vocalist: Singles	Nominated	
1978	Kenny Rogers and Dottie West	Best New Duo's: Pop LP's	Nominated	
1978	Kenny Rogers and Dottie West	Duo's: Pop LP's	Nominated	
1978	Kenny Rogers and Dottie West	Country Group Crossover: Pop LP's	Nominated	
1978	Kenny Rogers and Dottie West	New Duets: Country LP's	Nominated	
1978	Kenny Rogers and Dottie West	New Duets: Country Singles	Nominated	
1980	Dottie West	Top Female Vocalist	Nominated	
1980	Dottie West	Top Female Crossover	Nominated	
1981	Dottie West	Top Country Crossover Female	Nominated	

== Clio Awards ==
Year	Nominee / work	Award	Result	Ref.
1974	Clio Awards	Advertising Excellence for "Country Sunshine" (with Billy Davis)	Won	

== Country Music Association Awards ==
Year	Nominee / work	Award	Result	Ref.
1967	Dottie West	Female Vocalist of the Year	Nominated	
1969	Don Gibson and Dottie West	Vocal Group of the Year	Nominated	
1970	Don Gibson and Dottie West	Vocal Duo of the Year	Nominated	
1978	Kenny Rogers and Dottie West	Vocal Duo of the Year	Won	
1979	Kenny Rogers and Dottie West	Vocal Duo of the Year	Won	

== Country Music Hall of Fame ==
Year	Nominee / work	Award	Result	Ref.
2018	Dottie West	Membership into the Country Music Hall of Fame	Inducted	

== Grammy Awards ==
Year	Nominee / work	Award	Result	Ref.
1965	Dottie West	Best New Country & Western Artist	Nominated	
1965	"Here Comes My Baby"	Best Country & Western Single	Nominated	
1965	"Here Comes My Baby"	Best Country Song	Nominated	
1965	"Here Comes My Baby"	Best Country and Western Vocal Performance – Female	Won	
1966	"Before the Ring on Your Finger Turns Green"	Best Country and Western Vocal Performance – Female	Nominated	
1967	"Would You Hold It Against Me"	Best Country and Western Vocal Performance – Female	Nominated	
1968	"Paper Mansions"	Best Country and Western Vocal Performance – Female	Nominated	
1968	Dottie West Sings Sacred Ballads	Best Sacred Performance	Nominated	
1969	"Country Girl"	Best Country and Western Vocal Performance – Female	Nominated	
1970	"Rings of Gold" (with Don Gibson)	Best Country Performance by a Duo or Group with Vocal	Nominated	
1974	"Country Sunshine"	Best Country Song	Nominated	
1974	"Country Sunshine"	Best Country and Western Vocal Performance – Female	Nominated	
1975	"Last Time I Saw Him"	Best Country and Western Vocal Performance – Female	Nominated	
1979	"Anyone Who Isn't Me Tonight" (with Kenny Rogers)	Best Country Performance by a Duo or Group with Vocal	Nominated	
1980	"All I Ever Need Is You" (with Kenny Rogers)	Best Country Performance by a Duo or Group with Vocal	Nominated	
1982	"What Are We Doin' in Love" (with Kenny Rogers)	Best Country Performance by a Duo or Group with Vocal	Nominated	

== Grand Ole Opry ==
Year	Nominee / work	Award	Result	Ref.
1964	Dottie West	Membership into the Grand Ole Opry	Inducted	

== Record World Magazine Awards ==
Year	Nominee / work	Award	Result	Ref.
1964	Dottie West	Fastest Climbing Female Vocalist	Won	
1965	Dottie West	Top Female Vocalist	Nominated	
1966	Dottie West	Top Female Vocalist	Nominated	
1967	Dottie West	Top Female Vocalist	Nominated	
1968	Dottie West	Top Female Vocalist	Nominated	
1969	Don Gibson and Dottie West	Top Vocal Duo	Nominated	
1970	Dottie West	Top Female Vocalist	Nominated	
1970	Don Gibson and Dottie West	Top Vocal Duo	Nominated	
1972	Dottie West	Top Female Vocalist	Nominated	
1977	Dottie West	Top Female Vocalist	Nominated	
1979	Kenny Rogers and Dottie West	Top Duo	Nominated	
1980	Dottie West	Top Female Vocalist	Nominated	
1981	Dottie West	Top Female Vocalist	Nominated	
