= House of Love =

House of Love may refer to:

== Music ==
- The House of Love, an English rock band

=== Albums ===
- House of Love (Amy Grant album), a 1994 Amy Grant album
- House of Love (Dottie West album), a 1974 album Dottie West album
- House of Love (Candi Staton album), 1978
- The House of Love (1988 album), the debut album by the British rock band the House of Love
- The House of Love (1990 album), the second album by the House of Love, usually referred to as Fontana

=== Songs ===
- "House of Love" (Amy Grant song), the title track from Amy Grant's 1994 House of Love album
- "House of Love" (Dottie West song), the title track from Dottie West's 1974 House of Love album
- "House of Love" (East 17 song), a 1992 East 17 song
- "House of Love" (RuPaul song), a 1993 RuPaul song
- "House of Love" (Smooth Touch song),
- "House of Love" (Vika and Linda song), a 1994 Vika and Linda song

== Other ==
- House of Love (Mumbai), houses homeless children in Mumbai, India
- The House of Love (show), revue by Jayne Mansfield
- A Spy in the House of Love, a 1954 novel by the French novelist Anaïs Nin
