= Last Time I Saw Him =

Studio album by Diana Ross
- Released: December 6, 1973
- Recorded: 1973
- Studios: Motown Recording Studios (Hollywood, California)
- Genres: Pop; soul; R&B
- Length: 30:28
- Label: Motown
- Producers: Michael Masser; Tom Baird; Ron Miller; Bob Gaudio

Diana Ross chronology
Diana & Marvin (1973)	Last Time I Saw Him (1973)	Live at Caesars Palace (1974)

Singles from Last Time I Saw Him
- 1. "Last Time I Saw Him" Released: December 6, 1973; 2. "Sleepin'" Released: April 4, 1974

Last Time I Saw Him is the fifth studio album by American singer Diana Ross, released on December 6, 1973 by Motown Records. It reached number 52 in the US (number 12 R&B). It also helped Ross win the 1974 American Music Award for Favorite R&B Female.

The arrangements were by Gene Page, Michael Omartian, Tom Baird, David Blumberg, Bob Gaudio, James Carmichael and Paul Riser. Harry Langdon was credited with the cover photography.

== Reception ==
Professional ratings
Review scores
Source	Rating
AllMusic	3.5/5 stars

The album yielded the title track single "Last Time I Saw Him", a multi-format hit that reached #1 (for three weeks) on the Billboard Hot Adult Contemporary, #14 on the Hot 100, and #15 on the Hot Soul singles. It peaked at #9 Pop on the Top 100 lists for both Cashbox and Record World, as well as #10 in Radio & Records. It also reached #35 in the United Kingdom.

"Sleepin'" was the second U.S. single, but despite a vocal performance that had shades of Billie Holiday, only reached #70 Pop and #50 R&B. In the U.K., the chosen 2nd single was the ballad "Love Me" (#38), whose lyrics were replete with double entendres.

"Behind Closed Doors" - previously a US #1 Country hit for Charlie Rich - was also released and became a Top 20 hit in South Africa, reaching number 14 as well as climbing as high as #2 on the singles chart in Zimbabwe. The album also included a cover version of the 60s hit "Turn Around" popularised by Dick and Dee Dee.

"Last Time I Saw Him" was a bit of a musical departure for Ross, with a sound combining country with Dixieland jazz. Shortly after its release, the song was remade by country music star Dottie West, who scored success with the single on the C&W charts, reaching #8.

The album had a disappointing chart run, reaching #52, and would be the last studio album Ross issued in the next three years until the Diana Ross album, released in 1976.

An expanded 2-CD set was issued by Hip-O Select in 2007, including previously unreleased tracks.

== Track listing ==
=== Original album ===
1. "Last Time I Saw Him" (Michael Masser, Pam Sawyer) – 2:50
2. "No One's Gonna Be a Fool Forever” (Michael Masser, Pam Sawyer) – 3:24
3. "Love Me" (Tom Baird, Dino Fekaris, Nick Zesses) – 2:56
4. "Sleepin'" (Terry Etlinger, Ron Miller) – 4:41
5. "You" (Terry Etlinger, Ron Miller) – 4:19
6. "Turn Around" (Harry Belafonte, Allan Greene, Malvina Reynolds) – 2:28
7. "When Will I Come Home to You" (Bob Gaudio, Al Ruzicka, Kathy Wakefield) – 3:14
8. "I Heard a Love Song (But You Never Made a Sound)" (Bob Gaudio, Brit Gaudio) – 2:32
9. "Stone Liberty" (Bob Gaudio, Kathy Wakefield) – 2:59
10. "Behind Closed Doors" (Kenny O'Dell) – 2:46

=== CD re-issue, limited edition with bonus tracks ===
Disc 1

1. "Last Time I Saw Him" (unreleased longer version) (Masser, Sawyer) – 3:10
2. "No One's Gonna Be a Fool Forever" (Masser, Sawyer) – 3:24
3. "Love Me" (Baird, Fekaris, Zesses) – 2:56
4. "Sleepin'" (Etlinger, Miller) – 4:41
5. "You" (Etlinger, Miller) – 4:19
6. "Turn Around" (Belafonte, Greene, Reynolds) – 2:28
7. "When Will I Come Home to You" (Gaudio, Ruzicka, Wakefield) – 3:14
8. "I Heard a Love Song (But You Never Made a Sound)" (Gaudio, Gaudio) – 2:32
9. "Stone Liberty" (Gaudio, Wakefield) – 2:59
10. "Behind Closed Doors" (O'Dell) – 2:46
11. "Last Time I Saw Him" [Japanese Quad Edition] (Masser, Sawyer) – 2:54
12. "No One's Gonna Be a Fool Forever" [Japanese Quad Edition] (Masser, Sawyer) – 3:34
13. "Love Me" [Japanese Quad Edition] (Baird, Fekaris, Zesses) – 2:57
14. "Sleepin'" [Japanese Quad Edition] (Etlinger, Miller) – 4:41
15. "You" [Japanese Quad Edition] (Etlinger, Miller) – 4:26
16. "Turn Around "[Japanese Quad Edition] (Belafonte, Greene, Reynolds) – 2:26
17. "When Will I Come Home to You" [Japanese Quad Edition] (Gaudio, Ruzicka, Wakefield) – 3:13
18. "I Heard a Love Song (But You Never Made a Sound)" [Japanese Quad Edition] (Gaudio, Gaudio) – 2:36
19. "Stone Liberty" [Japanese Quad Edition] (Gaudio, Wakefield) – 2:52
20. "Behind Closed Doors" [Japanese Quad Edition] (O'Dell) – 2:49

Disc 2

1. "I'll Be Here (When You Get Home)" (Bristol, Brown, Jones) – 3:50
2. "Why Play Games" (Leonard Caston, Jr., Anita Poree) – 2:41
3. "I Don't Care Where the Money Is" (Michael Randall) – 2:47
4. "Get It All Together" (Poree, Sanders, Scarborough) – 4:01
5. "Where Did We Go Wrong" [Version 1] (Baird, Miller) – 3:52
6. "Since I Don't Have You" (James Beaumont, Wally Lester, Joe Rock, Jackie Taylor, Joe VerScharen, Janet Vogel) – 3:23
7. "Let Me Be the One" (Nichols, Williams) – 2:27
8. "I Want to Go Back There Again" (Chris Clark, Berry Gordy, Jr.) – 3:03
9. "Old Funky Rolls" [alternate take] (Etlinger, Miller) – 3:47
10. "Last Time I Saw Him" [original unedited version] (Masser, Sawyer) – 3:39

== Charts ==
Chart performance for Last Time I Saw Him
Chart (1974)	Peak position
Australia (Kent Music Report)	50
Canada Top Albums/CDs (RPM)	68
New Zealand (Listener)	18
UK Albums (Official Charts)	41
US Billboard 200	52
US Top R&B/Hip-Hop Albums (Billboard)	12
US Cashbox Top Albums	29
