= Lay Back Lover =

Single by Dottie West

from the album House of Love
- B-side: "Good Lovin' You"
- Released: November 1974
- Recorded: January 1974
- Studio: RCA Studio A (Nashville, Tennessee)
- Genre: Country; Nashville Sound
- Length: 2:43
- Label: RCA Victor
- Songwriters: Rafe Van Hoy; Steve Pippin
- Producer: Billy Davis

Dottie West singles chronology
| "House of Love" (1974) | "Lay Back Lover" (1974) | "Rollin' in Your Sweet Sunshine" (1975) |

"Lay Back Lover" is a song written by Rafe Van Hoy and Steve Pippin, and recorded by American country music artist Dottie West. It was released in November 1974 as the third single from the album House of Love. The song reached the top 40 of the US country chart. It was given positive reviews following its release.

== Background and recording ==
Dottie West had become country music's first female artist to win a Grammy award in the 1960s. From the mid-1960s through the mid-1970s, West had a series of top ten and top 40 singles on the US country chart. One of her mid 1970s singles was the song "Lay Back Lover". The track was written by Rafe Van Hoy and Steve Pippin. The song was described by Cashbox as being about "faith in love". "Lay Back Lover" was produced by Billy Davis in January 1974 at RCA Victor Studios, located in Nashville, Tennessee.

== Release, chart performance and critical reception ==
"Lay Back Lover" was released as a single by RCA Victor in November 1974. It was backed on the B-side by the track "Good Lovin' You". The disc was distributed as a seven-inch vinyl record. Cashbox magazine positively commented that the track had "excellent background harmonies", along with "an infectious beat". The track was spawned as the third and final single from West's studio album House of Love "Lay Back Lover" debuted on the US Billboard Hot Country Songs chart on December 14, 1974. It spent a total of ten weeks on the chart, reaching the number 35 position in February 1975. It was West's twenty seventh top 40 single on the US country chart and would be her last until 1977's "When It's Just You and Me".

== Track listing ==
7 inch vinyl single

- "Lay Back Lover" – 2:43
- "Good Lovin' You" – 2:55

== Chart performance ==
Weekly chart performance for "Lay Back Lover"
| Chart (1974–1975) | Peak position |
|---|---|
| US Hot Country Songs (Billboard) | 35 |
