= Big Dreams and Broken Hearts: The Dottie West Story =

- VHS cover
- Genre: Biography; Drama; Music
- Written by: Theresa Rogerton
- Directed by: Bill D'Elia
- Starring: Michele Lee
- Theme music composer: Edgar Struble
- Country of origin: United States
- Original language: English

Production
- Producer: Michele Lee
- Cinematography: Richard Rawlings
- Editor: Bill Johnson
- Running time: 93 minutes
- Production companies: Kragen Productions; Michele Lee Productions

Original release
- Network: CBS
- Release: January 22, 1995

Big Dreams and Broken Hearts: The Dottie West Story is a 1995 American television biopic about the life of country music singer Dottie West portrayed by Michele Lee. Bill D'Elia directed the film which was shot in Nashville, TN, between July 11 and August 4, 1994. The film first aired on January 22, 1995, on CBS.

== Background ==
The movie chronicles the life and rise to fame of country music singer Dottie West (Lee). It starts off with West as a young child living with her abusive father, then leading to her first big break on the Landmark Jamboree television show in Ohio in the early 50s. The movie then moves to the 60s where West skyrockets to fame as a country music singer with the Top 10 hit "Here Comes My Baby Back Again", which then leads to West winning a Grammy Award in 1965, becoming the first female country singer to win a Grammy. The movie continues providing the highs and lows of West's career, including her new image in the late-70s, where West has her biggest success duetting with Kenny Rogers (who plays himself in the movie). The movie also chronicles some of West's personal problems, including her three marriages and her financial problems, culminating in her death in a car accident.

Lee later described this role as the role she was born to play, and cited the role as one of her favorites. Most of the outfits Lee wore in the movie were West's original clothing, including six wigs, three kinds of artificial nails, and West's infamous Bob Mackie costumes, a total of 56 costumes in all. In addition to Rogers, country singers Larry Gatlin and Loretta Lynn (close friends of West's) portrayed themselves, and Dolly Parton and Willie Nelson also provide narration. West's family, including her children (Mo, Kerry, Shelly, Dale) helped with the making of the movie.

The role of Patsy Cline was to be played by Kate Jackson. When Jackson's health problems necessitated, she withdrew from the film just before shooting started in Nashville. Local stage actress Tere Myers, who was appearing at the Ryman Auditorium in a production of Always...Patsy Cline, was recruited to take over the role. (During her long association with Always...Patsy Cline, Myers has always played Cline's friend Louise Seeger rather than the singer herself.)

== Main cast ==
| Actor | Role |
| Michele Lee | Dottie West |
| William Russ | Bill West |
| Lisa Akey | Shelly West |
| Taylor Farnsworth | Tess West |
| David James Elliott | Byron Metcalf |
| Norm Woodel | Jim Reeves |
| Tere Myers | Patsy Cline |
| Cathy Worthington | Jeannie Seely |
| Ben Browder | Al Winters |
| Tony Higgins | Kris Kristofferson (younger) |
| Kris Kristofferson | Himself |
| Kenny Rogers | Himself |
| Stuart Greer | Owen |
| Chris McCarty | Willie Nelson (younger) |
| Dolly Parton | Herself |
| Willie Nelson | Himself |
| Larry Gatlin | Himself |
| Chet Atkins | Himself |
| Loretta Lynn | Herself |

== Soundtrack ==
The soundtrack for the movie was not West's original recordings. Michele Lee sang all of West's material for the movie. The soundtrack is listed as follows:

1. "Country Sunshine" (Michele Lee)
2. "Act Naturally" (Michele Lee)
3. "Welcome to My World" (Michele Lee)
4. "Here Comes My Baby Back Again" (Michele Lee)
5. "Country Girl" (Michele Lee)
6. "Life of the Party" (Larry Gatlin)
7. "Every Time Two Fools Collide" (Michele Lee and Kenny Rogers)
8. "Anyone Who Isn't Me Tonight" (Michele Lee and Kenny Rogers)
9. "Paper Mansions" (Michele Lee)
10. "Last Time I Saw Him" (Michele Lee)
11. "A Lesson in Leaving" (Michele Lee)
12. "Blue as I Want To" (Michele Lee)

The soundtrack was released on CD and cassette.

== Award nominations ==
| Year | Award | Result | Category | Recipient |
|---|---|---|---|---|
| 1995 | Primetime Emmy Award | Nominated | Outstanding Individual Achievement in Cinematography for a Miniseries or a Special | Richard Rawlings |
| 1995 | Primetime Emmy Award | Nominated | Outstanding Individual Achievement in Hairstyling for a Miniseries or a Special | James Encao |
