= House of Love (Dottie West song) =

Single by Dottie West

from the album House of Love
- B-side: "Love as Long as We Can"
- Released: June 1974
- Recorded: January 1974
- Studio: RCA Studio A (Nashville, Tennessee)
- Genre: Country; Nashville Sound
- Length: 2:06
- Label: RCA Victor
- Songwriter: Kenny O'Dell
- Producer: Billy Davis

Dottie West singles chronology
"Last Time I Saw Him" (1974)	"House of Love" (1974)	"Lay Back Lover" (1974)

"House of Love" is a song written by Kenny O'Dell, and recorded by American country music artist Dottie West. It was released in June 1974 as the second single and title track from the album House of Love. The song reached the top 30 on the US country charts. It was given positive reviews following its release.

== Background and recording ==
Although first achieving commercial success in the 1960s, Dottie West had her highest-peaking single to date with 1973's "Country Sunshine". She followed it during the 1970s with several more top 40 singles. Among her follow-up songs to "Country Sunshine" was 1974's "House of Love". The song was penned by Kenny O'Dell, who had recently found success as a Nashville songwriter with songs like "Behind Closed Doors" and "Trouble in Paradise". "House of Love" was recorded at RCA Victor Studios in January 1974 in sessions produced by Billy Davis.

== Release, chart performance and critical reception ==
"House of Love" was released as a single by RCA Victor in June 1974. It was backed on the B-side by the track "Love as Long as We Can". The disc was distributed as a seven-inch vinyl record. It was spawned as the second single from West's studio album of the same name. "House of Love" debuted on the US Billboard Hot Country Songs chart on July 13, 1974. It spent a total of 13 weeks on the chart, reaching the number 21 position on September 21. It was West's twenty sixth top 40 single. It was later praised by writer Robert K. Oermann who called "House of Love" an "example[s] of the Nashville Sound at its finest."

== Track listing ==
7 inch vinyl single

- "House of Love" – 2:06
- "Love as Long as We Can" – 2:37

== Chart performance ==
Weekly chart performance for "House of Love"
Chart (1974)	Peak position
US Hot Country Songs (Billboard)	21
