= Carolina Cousins =

Studio album by Dottie West
- Released: May 1975
- Recorded: January 1975
- Studio: RCA Studio A, Nashville, Tennessee
- Genre: Country; Nashville Sound
- Label: RCA Victor
- Producer: Billy Davis

Dottie West chronology
House of Love (1974)	Carolina Cousins (1975)	When It's Just You and Me (1977)

Singles from Carolina Cousins
- 1. "Rollin' in Your Sweet Sunshine" Released: March 1975

Carolina Cousins is a studio album by American country music artist Dottie West. It was released in May 1975 on RCA Victor Records and was produced by Billy Davis. Carolina Cousins was West's 24th studio recording and contained a total of ten tracks. It would be her final album release with the RCA label before moving to United Artists Records in 1976. The album contained one single, "Rollin' in Your Sweet Sunshine," which became a minor hit in 1975.

== Background and content ==
Carolina Cousins was recorded at the RCA Studio A in Nashville, Tennessee. The sessions were produced by Billy Davis. It was West's third production collaboration with Davis, who had also written her 1973 hit "Country Sunshine". The album's ten tracks contained a variety of musical stylings. Liner notes writer, Bill Becker, called the album's style "a musical trip, literally and figuratively." Four of the album's songs were penned by West herself. This included a re-recording of "Country Sunshine" and "I'm Your Country Girl". Also included was a cover of John Denver's pop hit "Back Home Again." The album also included a variety of songwriters, such as Barbara Fairchild, who wrote the track "This Stranger, My Little Girl". The album's cover photo featured West posing with a Coca-Cola, a nod to the "Country Sunshine"'s origins as a jingle for a 1972 Coke commercial.

== Release and chart performance ==
Carolina Cousins was released in May 1975 on RCA Victor Records. It was West's 24th studio album and her final for the RCA label. It was offered as a vinyl LP, containing five songs on each side of the record. The album made the Billboard Top Country Albums chart. It spent two weeks on the chart and peaked at number 45 in June 1975. "Rollin' in Your Sweet Sunshine" was the only single included on the album. It was first issued as a single in March 1975. Spending ten weeks on the Billboard Hot Country Singles chart, it only reached number 68 by July 1975.

== Track listing ==
Side one
No.	Title	Writer(s)	Length
1.	"Carolina Cousins"	Bill Backer; Rod McBrien	3:48
2.	"This Stranger, My Little Girl"	Barbara Fairchild; Rafe Van Hoy	3:51
3.	"I'm Your Country Girl"	Billy Davis; Dottie West	2:15
4.	"Destroy Me, Again"	Jay Marshall; West	2:13
5.	"A Beautiful Way to Live"	Ben Peters	2:56

Side two
No.	Title	Writer(s)	Length
1.	"Route 65 to Nashville"	Backer; McBrien	2:48
2.	"Back Home Again"	John Denver	4:58
3.	"Country Sunshine"	Davis; West	1:57
4.	"A Rock 'n' Roll Drummer in a Country Girl's Band"	West	2:25
5.	"Rollin' in Your Sweet Sunshine"	Bob Morrison; Harris	2:26

== Personnel ==
All credits are adapted from the liner notes of Carolina Cousins.

Musical personnel

- Bucky Barrett – guitar
- The Jordanaires – background vocals
- Mike Leech – bass
- Terry McMillian – harmonica
- Byron Metcalf – drums
- Weldon Myrick – dobro
- The Nashville Edition – background vocals
- Kenny O'Dell – guitar
- Ron Oates – keyboards
- Dale Sellers – guitar
- Buddy Spicher – violin
- Henry Strzelecki – bass
- Bobby Thompson – guitar
- Dottie West – lead vocals

Technical personnel

- Bill Backer – liner notes
- Billy Davis – producer
- Byron Metcalf – percussion
- D. Bergen White – string arrangement

== Chart performance ==
Chart (1975)	Peak position
US Top Country Albums (Billboard)	45

== Release history ==
Region	Date	Format	Label	Ref.
North America	May 1975	Vinyl	RCA Victor	
United Kingdom	May 1975	Vinyl	RCA Victor	
