= Last Time I Saw Him (song) =

1973 single by Diana Ross

Single by Diana Ross

from the album Last Time I Saw Him
- B-side: "Save the Children"
- Released: December 6, 1973
- Recorded: 1973
- Genre: Country soul
- Length: 2:49 (Album/Single Version); 3:39 (Unedited Version)
- Label: Motown
- Songwriters: Michael Masser, Pam Sawyer
- Producer: Michael Masser

Diana Ross singles chronology
"You're a Special Part of Me" (1973)	"Last Time I Saw Him" (1973)	"My Mistake (Was to Love You)" (1974)

"Last Time I Saw Him" is a 1973 song by Diana Ross, being a composition by Michael Masser and lyricist Pam Sawyer. The track was produced by Masser and released as the first single on December 6, 1973, from her album of the same name.

== Original version ==
Michael Masser had also composed and produced the precedent solo Diana Ross single "Touch Me in the Morning", a dreamy ballad which had hit #1, but "Last Time I Saw Him" took a drastically different musical direction: AMG would note that on the "arguably campy" last-named track, arrangers Michael Omartian and Gene Page "throw in everything but the proverbial kitchen sink with a score that is all over the musical map from Dixieland-band jazz to banjo-pickin' and even an orchestrated string section", while Billboard would describe "Last Time I Saw Him" as "a light romp in the Tony Orlando and Dawn style."

The song's narrator recalls how she saw her "honey" off on a Greyhound bus having given the man a large amount of money to establish future living arrangements for the two of them; six months have since passed with no word and the narrator resultantly announces her intention to go in search of her errant swain in the naive belief he has been stranded by some ill-fortune from which she can retrieve him.

Ross scored her seventh Top 40 hit with "Last Time I Saw Him", which peaked at number 14 on the Billboard Hot 100 in February 1974, and a Top 20 R&B hit, where it peaked at 16. The track had its greatest impact in the easy listening market, where it was number 1 for three weeks on the Billboard Easy Listening chart. "Last Time I Saw Him" was named the biggest Easy Listening Hit of 1974.

Ross also charted with "Last Time I Saw Him" in Australia at number 18 and in the UK at 35.

== Chart performance ==
=== Weekly charts ===
Chart (1973–1974)	Peak position
Australia	18
Canada Top Singles (RPM)	8
Canada Adult Contemporary (RPM)	50
New Zealand (Listener)	18
UK Singles (Official Charts)	35
US Billboard Hot 100	14
US Hot R&B/Hip-Hop Songs (Billboard)	15
US Adult Contemporary (Billboard)	1
US Cash Box Top 100	9

=== Year-end charts ===
Chart (1974)	Rank
Australia	156
Canada	86
US (Joel Whitburn's Pop Annual)	129

== Dottie West version ==
"Last Time I Saw Him"

Single by Dottie West

from the album House of Love
- B-side: "Everybody Bring a Song"
- Released: February 1974
- Recorded: January 1974
- Genre: Country
- Length: 3:00
- Label: RCA Victor
- Songwriters: Michael Masser, Pam Sawyer
- Producer: Billy Davis

Dottie West singles chronology
"Country Sunshine" (1973)	"Last Time I Saw Him" (1974)	"House of Love" (1974)

Dottie West expediently covered "Last Time I Saw Him" for the C&W market in the January 1974 recording sessions at the RCA Victor Studio in Nashville which resulted in the House of Love album produced by Billy Davis. West's "Last Time I Saw Him" reached #8 on the C&W chart in Billboard in February 1974 marking the first time West had scored back-to-back C&W Top Ten hits, her precedent single having been her career record "Country Sunshine"; this success was followed by a progressive drop in West's hitmaking power with her longtime label RCA Victor eventually dropping her in 1976. Although West's subsequent signing with United Artists boosted her chart profile, her next C&W Top Ten hit following "Last Time I Saw Him" would not occur until 1980, when "A Lesson in Leavin'" afforded West her first #1 solo hit (four Dottie West/Kenny Rogers duets had reached the Top Ten in 1978-79 including #1 hits "Every Time Two Fools Collide" and "All I Ever Need Is You").

=== Charts ===
Chart (1974)	Peak position
US Hot Country Songs (Billboard)	8

== Other versions ==
Michele Lee recorded "Last Time I Saw Him" for the soundtrack album of the 1995 TV-biopic Big Dreams and Broken Hearts: The Dottie West Story in which Lee portrayed West. The song has also been recorded by Elke Best (de) (as "Du bist der Größte"), Lea Laven (as "Jää Vielä Aamuun") and Lill-Babs (as "Du alter Gauner").

== See also ==
- List of number-one adult contemporary singles of 1974 (U.S.)
