= Rings of Gold =

Single by Dottie West and Don Gibson

from the album Dottie and Don
- B-side: "Final Examination"
- Released: February 1969
- Genre: Country
- Length: 2:43
- Label: RCA Victor
- Songwriter: Gene Thomas
- Producers: Chet Atkins; Danny Davis

Dottie West singles chronology
"Reno" (1968)	"Rings of Gold" (1969)	"Sweet Memories" (1969)

Don Gibson singles chronology
"Ever Changing Mind" (1969)	"Rings of Gold" (1969)	"Solitary" (1969)

"Rings of Gold" is a song recorded by American country music artists Dottie West and Don Gibson. It was released in February 1969 as the first single from their album Dottie and Don. The song peaked at number 2 on the Billboard Hot Country Singles chart. It also reached number 1 on the RPM Country Tracks chart in Canada.

The duet – a mid-tempoed country pop-flavored song about a failing relationship – became the first of two duets pairing West and Gibson to reach the top 10 of the Billboard Hot Country Singles chart, the other being the No. 7 hit "There's a Story (Goin' 'Round)" in January 1970. "Rings of Gold" was West's biggest hit to that point in her career, and her 1973 solo hit "Country Sunshine" would match it; both remained her biggest hits until "Every Time Two Fools Collide," her 1978 No. 1 duet with Kenny Rogers. For Gibson, it was his first top 10 hit in two years, the last coming with 1967's "Funny, Familiar, Forgotten Feelings" (No. 8), and his biggest hit since "Lonesome Number One," a No. 2 hit in early 1962.

== Chart performance ==
Chart (1969)	Peak position
U.S. Billboard Hot Country Singles	2
Canadian RPM Country Tracks	1
