= Country Sunshine (Dottie West album) =

Studio album by Dottie West
- Released: November 1973
- Recorded: July 1973
- Studio: RCA Studio B (Nashville, Tennessee)
- Genre: Country; Nashville Sound
- Length: 32:14
- Label: RCA Victor
- Producer: Billy Davis

Dottie West chronology
If It's All Right With You/Just What I've Been Looking For (1973)	Country Sunshine (1973)	House of Love (1974)

Singles from Country Sunshine
- 1. "Country Sunshine" Released: August 1973

Country Sunshine is a studio album by American country music artist Dottie West. It was released in November 1973 on RCA Victor Records. The album's ten tracks were produced by Billy Davis. Her 21st studio recording, Country Sunshine was released following the success of the title track. The song became a major hit after first being part of a Coca-Cola commercial. The album itself would reach major positions on national publication charts following its release.

== Background and content ==
The creation of Country Sunshine was derived from the success of the title track. The song was written by West and the album's producer (Billy Davis). The pair had been collaborating musically for several years after West had been signed to write commercial jingles for the Coca-Cola soda company. When the title track became a hit, West went into the recording studio to make an album around it. It was West's first production assignment with Davis. The sessions were produced in July 1973 at the RCA Studio in Nashville, Tennessee. The collection consisted of ten tracks. The album included several new tracks, including "My Mind's Gone to Memphis" which was written by Larry Gatlin. Another new track was "The Lady", was co-written by West and Red Lane. The project also featured cover versions of several songs. Among the cover songs was Paul McCartney's "My Love", the Eagles' "Desperado" and "Jesse" by Janis Ian.

== Release and reception ==
Country Sunshine was released in November 1973 on RCA Victor Records, becoming her 21st studio album issued in her career. It was issued as a vinyl LP, containing five songs on each side of the record. Country Sunshine peaked at number 17 on the Billboard Top Country Albums chart in February 1974, after spending 17 weeks on the list. It was West's highest-charting album since 1968. Billboard Magazine reviewed Country Sunshine in November 1973, giving it a warm reception. Writers especially praised West's cover of "My Love" and the original composition, "It's Been a Long Time Since Atlanta". They also praised the album's sound and style. "Dottie comes on with a smoothness which lasts throughout the album. Almost all ballads, it's Dottie at her best, including her hit single," staff writers commented.

The title track had been released as a single in 1973. It was first issued as a single in August 1973. By November, the song had peaked at number two on the Billboard Hot Country Singles chart. The song also became her second single to cross over to the Billboard Hot 100, where it reached a peak position of 49. It became West's first major hit since 1970 following its success. On the Canadian RPM Country Singles chart, the title track also became a major hit, peaking at number nine.

== Track listing ==
Side one
No.	Title	Writer(s)	Length
1.	"My Mind's Gone to Memphis"	Larry Gatlin	3:05
2.	"You Take Me Home, Honey"	Bill Becker; Sandy Mason	2:47
3.	"We Had It All"	Donnie Fritts; Troy Seals	2:53
4.	"My Love"	Linda McCartney; Paul McCartney	3:31
5.	"Desperado"	Glenn Frey; Don Henley	3:15

Side two
No.	Title	Writer(s)	Length
1.	"Jesse"	Janis Ian	3:56
2.	"The Lady"	Red Lane; Dottie West	3:34
3.	"Country Sunshine"	Billy Davis; Dottie West	2:07
4.	"Help Me"	Gatlin	3:24
5.	"It's Been a Long Time Since Atlanta"	Davis; Dianne Whiles	3:30

== Personnel ==
All credits are adapted from the liner notes of Country Sunshine.

Musical personnel

- David Briggs – piano
- Marie F. Cain – backing vocals
- Larry Londin – drums
- Weldon Myrick – steel guitar
- The Nashville Edition – backing vocals
- Hargus "Pig" Robbins – piano
- Dale Sellers – guitar
- Jerry Shook – guitar
- Buddy Spicher – fiddle
- Bobby Thompson – banjo
- Chip Young – guitar
- Steve Wariner – bass
- Dottie West – lead vocals

Technical personnel

- Coca-Cola – cover photo
- Billy Davis – producer
- Acy Lehman – cover photo
- Al Puchucki – engineering
- David Roys – recording technician
- Mike Shockley – recording technician
- Bill Vandevort – engineering

== Chart performance ==
Chart (1973–74)	Peak position
US Top Country Albums (Billboard)	17

== Release history ==
Region	Date	Format	Label	Ref.
North America	November 1973	Vinyl	RCA Victor	
United Kingdom	November 1973	Vinyl	RCA Victor	
North America	circa 2023	Music download; streaming	Sony Music Entertainment	
