= House of Love (Dottie West album) =

Studio album by Dottie West
- Released: May 1974
- Recorded: January 1974
- Studio: RCA Studio A, Nashville, Tennessee
- Genre: Country; Nashville Sound
- Length: 30:18
- Label: RCA Victor
- Producer: Billy Davis

Dottie West chronology
Country Sunshine (1973)	House of Love (1974)	Carolina Cousins (1975)

Singles from House of Love
- 1. "Last Time I Saw Him" Released: February 1974; 2. "House of Love" Released: June 1974; 3. "Lay Back Lover" Released: November 1974

House of Love is a studio album by American country music artist Dottie West. It was released in May 1974 on RCA Victor Records and was produced by Billy Davis. It was West's 22nd studio recording in her music career and contained ten tracks. Among its singles was the song "Last Time I Saw Him", which became a top ten hit in 1974.

== Background and content ==
House of Love was recorded at the RCA Studio in January 1974. The sessions were produced by Billy Davis. Over the past several years, West had written music with Davis. Their songs were used as commercial jingles for the Coca-Cola company. However, after the success of their commercial (which was turned into a hit single) called "Country Sunshine", Davis started producing West. The album consisted of ten tracks. Among its compositions was a song co-written by Davis, West and Byron Metcalf (her second husband). It also included a cover version of Diana Ross's pop hit from 1974, "Last Time I Saw Him". In addition, the project included a composition by Kris Kristofferson and a composition by Willie Nelson.

== Release and reception ==
House of Love was released in May 1974 via RCA Victor Records and became West's 22nd studio album. It was issued as a vinyl LP, containing five songs on each side of the record. Unlike her previous studio release, House of Love did not reach the Billboard music charts, most notably the Top Country Albums chart. Billboard later reviewed House of Love and gave it a positive response. They praised the quality of the album's songs and its songwriting. "Utilizing some of the best songwriters around, Dottie has gathered some really great material for this album. Mostly soft ballads that she does with so much feeling, some up-tempo and some good country blues," writers commented.

The album included three singles that were released in 1974. "Last Time I Saw Him" was the first single released, which occurred in February 1974. After 14 weeks on the Billboard Hot Country Singles chart, the single became a major hit, climbing to #8 by May. The title track was released as the album's second single in June 1974. Spending 13 weeks chart, it eventually reached #21 on the country songs chart by September. "Lay Back Lover" was the final single released from the album (November 1974). By early 1975, the song had reached #35 on the country songs list.

== Track listing ==
Side one
No.	Title	Writer(s)	Length
1.	"Lay Back Lover"	Steve Pippin; Rafe Van Hoy	2:43
2.	"Everybody Bring a Song"	Bill Backer	2:48
3.	"Last Time I Saw Him"	Michael Masser; Pam Sawyer	3:00
4.	"Just the Other Side of Nowhere"	Kris Kristofferson	2:46
5.	"House of Love"	Kenny O'Dell	2:06

Side two
No.	Title	Writer(s)	Length
1.	"Good Lovin' You"	Larry Gatlin	2:54
2.	"I Still Can't Believe You're Gone"	Willie Nelson	4:13
3.	"I Like to Hear the Rain"	Alex Harvey	3:21
4.	"Does It Matter"	Donna Fargo	3:15
5.	"Love as Long as We Can"	Davis; Byron Metcalf; Dottie West	3:30

== Personnel ==
All credits are adapted from the liner notes of House of Love.

Musical personnel

- Joe Allen — bass
- Brenton Banks — violin
- Bucky Barrett — electric guitar
- George Binkley — violin
- Marvin Chantry — viola
- Johnny Gimble — fiddle
- Martin Katahn — violin
- Sheldon Kurland — violin
- Byron Metcalf — Drums
- Martha McCrory — cello
- Weldon Myrick — steel guitar
- The Nashville Edition — background vocals
- Kenny O'Dell — acoustic guitar
- Ron Oates — piano, organ, vibes
- Dale Sellers — electric guitar
- Bobbe Seymour — steel guitar
- Steve Smith — violin
- Buddy Spicher — fiddle
- Henry Strzelecki — bass
- Chris Teal — violin
- Bobby Thompson — acoustic guitar, banjo
- David Vanderkooi — cello
- Gary Vanosdale — viola
- Bergen White — String arrangements
- Stephanie Woolf — violin
- Chip Young — acoustic guitar

Technical personnel

- Billy Davis — producer
- Al Pachucki — engineering
- Bill Vandevort — engineering

== Release history ==
Region	Date	Format	Label	Ref.
North America	May 1974	Vinyl	RCA Victor	
United Kingdom	May 1974	Vinyl	RCA Victor	
