= The Comic =

1969 film by Carl Reiner

- theatrical poster
- Directed by: Carl Reiner
- Written by: Carl Reiner; Aaron Ruben
- Produced by: Carl Reiner; Aaron Ruben
- Starring: Dick Van Dyke; Michele Lee; Mickey Rooney
- Narrated by: Dick Van Dyke
- Cinematography: W. Wallace Kelley
- Edited by: Adrienne Fazan
- Music by: Jack Elliott
- Production company: Acre Enterprises
- Distributed by: Columbia Pictures
- Release dates: November 19, 1969 (New York City); December 26, 1969 (United States)
- Running time: 94 minutes
- Country: United States
- Language: English

The Comic is a 1969 American Pathécolor comedy-drama film co-written, co-produced, and directed by Carl Reiner. It stars Dick Van Dyke as Billy Bright (which was the original title of the film), Michele Lee as Bright's love interest, and Reiner himself and Mickey Rooney as Bright's friends and colleagues. Reiner wrote the screenplay with Aaron Ruben; it was inspired by the end of silent film era and, in part, by the life of silent film superstar Buster Keaton.

== Plot ==
Billy Bright (Dick Van Dyke), a silent-era film comedian, narrates this film which begins at his character's funeral in 1969 and tells his life story in flashbacks, unable to see his own faults and morosely (and incorrectly) blaming others for anything that has gone wrong.

Headstrong and talented, vaudeville clown Bright arrives on his first California film location insisting that he will perform his bit role only if he can wear the outrageous costume and makeup of the character he has been known for on the stage. The director (Cornel Wilde) refuses and Bright begins to storm off, but when his car rolls off a cliff he is forced to accept the terms. As soon as the cameras are rolling, however, he improvises (and sabotages) his way to becoming the hero of the scenario. His combination of acquiescence and audacity pays off, and before long he has become a major film comedy star in the 1910s and '20s, the silent picture era of Buster Keaton, Harold Lloyd, Charlie Chaplin and Stan Laurel.

Bright steals his leading lady, Mary (Michele Lee), and is beaten up by the director, whom she's been dating. The two increasingly popular performers marry, starting their own production company together. As early as her pregnancy, she begins to suspect his adultery; when she confronts him, he tries to turn the tables and shame her into apologizing for the accusation. But at the height of their fame and fortune, he is served with papers naming him in a Hollywood power couple's divorce filing. Mary leaves him, taking their young son and the couple's palatial estate.

Bright sinks into despair and alcoholism, also leaving the country to film in Europe for four years. He sobers up and attempts a comeback in Hollywood but — ever living in the past — will accept it on no other terms than those he had been accustomed to, adamantly refusing the studio's offer to star him in a talkie, and storming out on his agent (Carl Reiner). Like the film industry, people are moving along without Billy, including his wife, who rebuffs his attempt to win her back. The one constant in his life, other than his decreasingly appealing sense of identity, is his old screen sidekick and only friend, Cockeye (Mickey Rooney).

Decades later, a late-1960s talk show host (Steve Allen as himself) has the long-faded star on in an effort to revive Bright's career. The elderly comedian proves capable — if somewhat pathetically to the groovy stars of the day on the couch alongside him — of recreating his old pratfall schtick. The pitch works, but this time the only vehicle that will allow him to run through his preferred brand of slapstick is a detergent commercial. The denouement of Bright's life, and the film, finds him in and out of the hospital and visited by his now-grown son Billy Jr. (also played by Van Dyke in a dual role), reduced to setting the alarm in his dingy two-room apartment, and catching airings of him and his former wife's old comedies at odd hours on TV — which he watches without a hint of a smile.

== Cast ==
- Dick Van Dyke as Billy Bright and as Billy Bright, Jr.
- Michele Lee as Mary Gibson
- Mickey Rooney as Martin "Cockeye" Van Buren
- Cornel Wilde as Frank Powers
- Nina Wayne as Sybil
- Pert Kelton as Mama
- Steve Allen as himself
- Barbara Heller (actress)Barbara Heller as Ginger
- Ed Peck as Edwin G. Englehardt
- Jeannine Riley as Lorraine
- Gavin Mac Leod [sic] as 1st Director
- Jay Novello as Miguel
- Craig Huebing as Doctor
- Paulene Myers as Phoebe
- Fritz Feld as Armand
- Isabell Sanford [sic] as Woman in Detergent Commercial
- Jeff Donnell as Nurse
- Carl Reiner as Al Schilling

== Production ==
In his autobiography, Carl Reiner said that he wrote the film as a vehicle for Van Dyke, who had often expressed the wish on the set of their TV show The Dick Van Dyke Show that he had been working at the same time as comedy legends such as his hero Stan Laurel.

Reiner loosely patterned the story of Bright's career downfall on the real-life travails of a number of early film actors, primarily Buster Keaton, who likewise saw his Hollywood success falter as filmgoers' tastes changed and he fell into alcoholism.

Some details parallel the experiences of silent comedians Harry Langdon and Harold Lloyd, as well as the film's co-star Mickey Rooney.

Van Dyke said in a 2025 interview he would go out with the crew with a 16mm camera and "look for things to do." He continued, "If a fire engine went by, I jumped on it. We had reams of footage that unfortunately disappeared. Just fun things we did out in public." To give the footage a vintage appearance, Van Dyke said the crew took all the film out in his backyard and dragged it over the grass.

== Response ==
The film did poorly at the box office upon its release, but it was appreciated later as a movie about one silent star's rise and fall, patterned after the many silent stars who tried to make it and failed in later years.

Among the exceptions were silent and sound film star Stan Laurel, whom Dick Van Dyke idolized. Van Dyke later learned that many imitators came and went since the end of Laurel's time with Oliver Hardy, and no attempt was made to legally stop them from imitating Laurel and his friend Hardy or even copying his face, which in part inspired this film.

Years later, Van Dyke said of The Comic: "very few people saw that movie, but we were proud of it."

== Home media ==
The Comic was released on VHS by RCA/Columbia Pictures Home Video in 1986 (OCLC 17939307). Columbia TriStar Home Entertainment also released a VHS edition the same year (ISBN 0800132823), and a DVD edition in 2013 (ASIN B00F1FVLPM). The film was also released on Laserdisc by Image Entertainment.

== See also ==
- List of American films of 1969
- Mr. Saturday Night
- Chaplin
- Benny & Joon
