= House of Love (Mumbai) =

Coordinates: 19°6′57.74″N 72°51′35.15″E

House of Love (Mumbai) Sneha Sadan
- Established: 1962; 64 years ago
- Location(s): Amrut Nagar, Chakala; Andheri East, Mumbai
- Founder: Ricardo Frances
- Director: Noel Pinto
- Affiliations: Jesuit, Catholic
- Website: snehasadan.org

House of Love (Mumbai) (Sneha Sadan) houses homeless children in the area of Mumbai, India, along with other services. It is a work of the Society of Jesus.

The first House of Love was a hut at Kajuwadi in Chakala, Andheri, with five boys. In April 1963 a second home was started in Gundowli village. Couples have been the houseparents for these homeless shelters from the start. In 1964 a third home was opened at Holy Cross Church in Kurla. A fourth followed in 1965 in Mogra village, housing 25 boys, and later a home near Andheri. By 1976 the eighth house was converted into the first girls home. This grew to where Sndha Sadan runs 15 homes, 10 for boys and five for girls, all but two in Mumbai. Some houses accommodate as many as 35 children, under the care of a husband and wife pair. In 1992 Sadan also opened a home for women and their children and in 2005 one for girls it rescues from sex trafficking.

== See also ==
- List of Jesuit sites
