= Dottie and Don =

Dottie & Don

Studio album by Don Gibson and Dottie West
- Released: March 1969
- Recorded: November 1968
- Studio: RCA Studio B
- Genre: Country; Nashville Sound
- Label: RCA Victor
- Producer: Chet Atkins; Danny Davis

Dottie West chronology
Feminine Fancy (1968)	Dottie & Don (1969)	Dottie Sings Eddy (1969)

Don Gibson chronology
More Country Soul (1968)	Dottie & Don (1969)	Don Gibson Sings All-Time Country Gold (1969)

Singles from Dottie & Don
- 1. "Rings of Gold" Released: February 1969; 2. "Sweet Memories" Released: June 1969

Dottie and Don is a studio album by American country music artists Don Gibson and Dottie West. It was released in March 1969 on RCA Victor Records and was produced by Chet Atkins and Danny Davis. The album was a collection of duet recordings between Gibson and West. It was both artists first album of duets to be recorded. Among the songs from the project, "Rings of Gold" became a major hit in 1969.

== Background and content ==
Dottie & Don was first collection of duets to be recorded by Don Gibson and Dottie West. While West had previously recorded with Jim Reeves, Gibson had not professionally cut duets with another performer. The album was produced by both Chet Atkins and Danny Davis. The sessions were recorded in November 1968 at RCA Studio B in Nashville, Tennessee.

The project was a collection of 12 duet recordings. One song, "Final Examination", was composed by West. Another song, "Sweet Dreams" was composed (and first recorded) by Gibson. Remaining tracks were either new recordings or cover versions of songs cut by others. Among the album's cover versions was "I Love You Because", which was first a hit by Leon Payne. Another cover included "When I Stop Dreaming", which was first a song by The Louvin Brothers. "Sweet Memories" was a third cover, which was first a hit by Andy Williams.

== Release and reception ==
Professional ratings
Review scores
Source	Rating
Allmusic	3/5 stars
Billboard	Favorable

Dottie & Don was originally released in March 1969 on RCA Victor Records. The album was first issued as a vinyl LP, featuring six songs on each side of the record. In 2019, the album was reissued to digital retailers by Sony Music Entertainment. Dottie & Don spent a total of 12 weeks on the Billboard Top Country Albums chart before peaking at number 21 in July 1969.

The album included two singles. The first being "Rings of Gold", which was released in February 1969. Spending 17 weeks on the Billboard Hot Country Singles chart, it reached number two later in the year. The song became West's highest-charting single up to that point. It would also become Gibson's highest-charting single in almost three years. Additionally, "Rings of Gold" reached number one on the Canadian RPM Country Singles chart. The album's cover of "Sweet Memories" was released as the second single in June 1969. The song became a top 40 hit later that year, reaching number 32 on the Billboard country chart.

Dottie & Don received positive reviews upon its release. In an April 1969 issue of Billboard magazine, reviewers praised the record. "This package is power-packed. With two such names -- Dottie West and Don Gibson -- doing duet versions of great songs, this must melt off the shelves," staff writers commented. The commentators also praised the production by Atkins and Davis, calling it an "added attraction". The record was also reviewed in years following by Allmusic. In their review, the album was given a rating of three out of five stars.

== Track listing ==
1. "Till I Can't Take It Anymore" (Clyde Otis, Dorian Burton) – 2:32
2. "Rings of Gold" (Gene Thomas) – 2:43
3. "How's the World Treating You" (Boudleaux Bryant, Chet Atkins) – 2:46
4. "Final Examination" (Red Lane, Dottie West) – 2:43
5. "I Love You Because" (Leon Payne) – 3:04
6. "Sweet Dreams" (Don Gibson) – 2:11
7. "Let's Wait a Little Longer" (Billy Sherrill, Curly Putman) – 2:54
8. "Set Me Free" (Curly Putman) – 2:09
9. "Sweet Memories" (Mickey Newbury) – 3:05
10. "I'll Never Stand in Your Way" (Fred Rose, Hy Heath) – 2:34
11. "Loving Season" (Gene Thomas) – 2:46
12. "When I Stop Dreaming" (Charlie Louvin, Ira Louvin) – 2:15

== Personnel ==
All credits are adapted from the liner notes of Dottie & Don.

Musical personnel

- Chet Atkins – guitar
- Byron Bach – cello
- Brenton Banks – violin
- Howard Carpenter – viola
- Jerry Carrigan – drums
- Marvin Chantry – violin
- Harold Cruthids – cello
- Ray Edenton – guitar
- Solie Fott – violin
- Martin Katahn – violin
- Shelly Kurland – violin
- The Jordanaires – background vocals
- Grady Martin – guitar
- Jerry Reed – guitar
- Hargus "Pig" Robbins – piano
- Pete Wade – guitar
- Bill West – pedal steel guitar
- Dottie West – vocals

Technical personnel

- Chet Atkins – producer
- Danny Davis – producer
- Al Pachucki – engineering

== Chart performance ==
Chart (1969)	Peak position
US Top Country Albums (Billboard)	21

== Release history ==
Region	Date	Format	Label	Ref.
United States	December 1968	Vinyl	RCA Victor	
United States	March 8, 2019	Music download	Sony Music Entertainment	
