= Michele Lee =

American actress (born 1942)

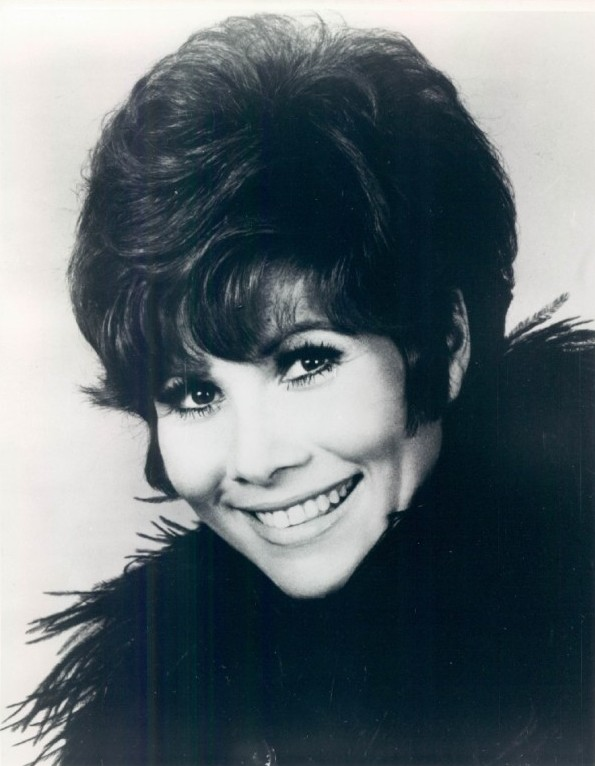
- Publicity photo of Michele Lee (1974)
- Born: Michelle Lee; June 24, 1942 (age 84); Los Angeles, California
- Education: Alexander Hamilton High School
- Occupations: Actress; singer; dancer
- Years active: 1960–present
- Known for: Knots Landing; How to Succeed in Business Without Really Trying; The Love Bug; The Comic; Seesaw
- Spouses: James Farentino (m. 1966; div. 1983) Fred A. Rappoport (m. 1987)
- Children: 1

Michele Lee (born June 24, 1942) is an American actress. She is best known for her role as Karen Fairgate MacKenzie on the prime-time soap opera Knots Landing, for which she was nominated for a 1982 Emmy Award and won the Soap Opera Digest Award for Best Actress in 1988, 1991, and 1992. She was the only performer to appear in all 344 episodes of the series. She is also known for her authorship of the best-selling autobiography My Father Was a Blackbelt.

Lee began her career on Broadway in Vintage 60 (1960) and How to Succeed in Business Without Really Trying (1962). She made her movie debut in the film version of the latter in 1967. Her other film appearances include the Disney film The Love Bug (1968), The Comic (1969), and Along Came Polly (2004). She was nominated for the Tony Award for Best Actress in a Musical in 1974 for Seesaw and for the Tony Award for Best Featured Actress in a Play in 2001 for The Tale of the Allergist's Wife. She also played the title role in the 1998 TV film Scandalous Me: The Jacqueline Susann Story and Madame Morrible in the 2015 Broadway musical Wicked. She was a guest on the series premiere of The Tim Conway Show in 1980.

== Early life ==
Michelle Lee Dusick was born on June 24, 1942, in Los Angeles, the daughter of Sylvia Helen (née Silverstein). She attended Alexander Hamilton High School.

== Career ==
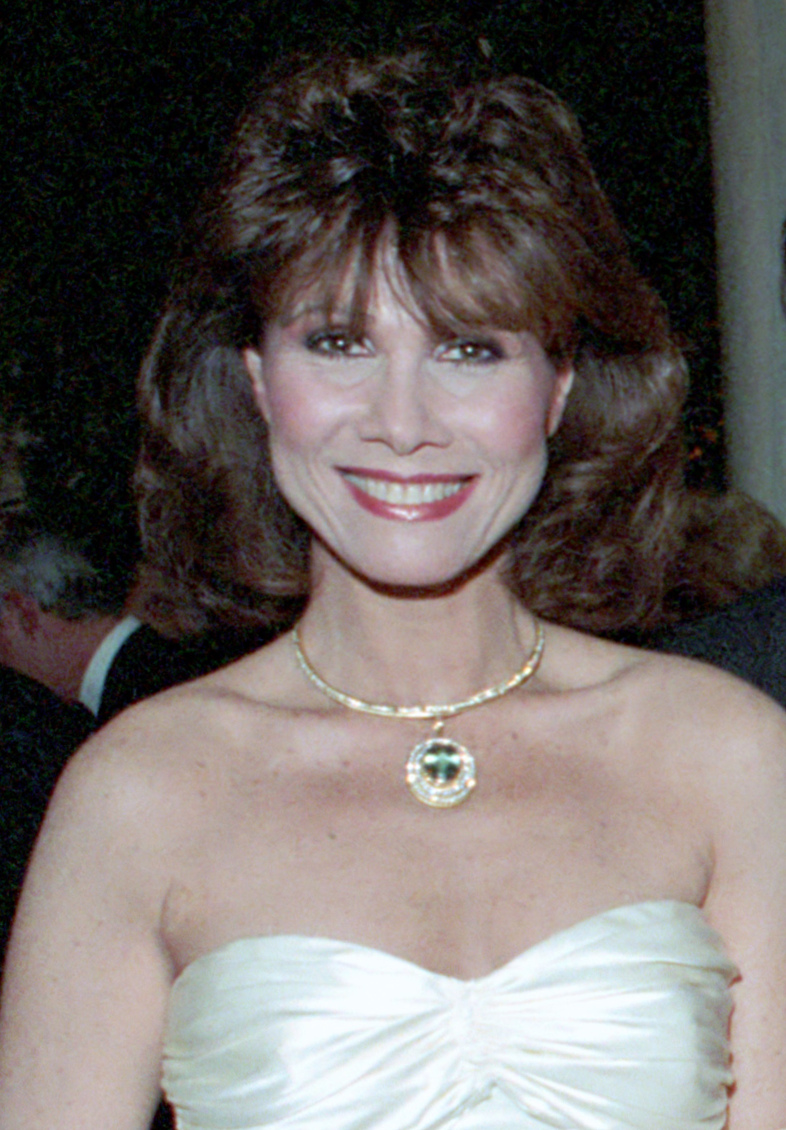
Lee in 1984

=== Career beginnings ===
Her television career began at age 19, on the December 26, 1961, episode of the CBS-TV sitcom The Many Loves of Dobie Gillis.

After she sang in the film version of How to Succeed in Business Without Really Trying, she became known for her roles in the films The Comic, opposite Dick Van Dyke, and The Love Bug, opposite Dean Jones, the latter becoming the second-highest-grossing film of 1969 in the United States. That same year, she starred in a special television production of the Jerome Kern–Otto Harbach musical, Roberta, in which she sang "Smoke Gets In Your Eyes", and also peaked at No. 52 on the Billboard Hot 100 with "L. David Sloane". She recorded two records on Columbia Records in the 1960s, in addition to her singing work on original Broadway cast albums. After the birth of her son, she worked infrequently until accepting a role on Broadway in Seesaw, which netted her a Tony Award nomination in 1974. After her mother's death, she stopped working to spend time with her son.

In 1974, Lee starred in the pilot episode of the proposed CBS sitcom The Michele Lee Show. She played Michele Burton, a clerk in a hotel newsstand, with support from Stephen Collins. However, only the pilot episode was aired, and the series did not proceed. Lee became a busy guest actor in the 1970s, appearing on Marcus Welby, M.D.; Alias Smith and Jones; Night Gallery; Love, American Style; Fantasy Island; The Love Boat; and The Match Game.

=== Knots Landing ===
In 1979, Lee accepted the role of Karen Fairgate on Knots Landing, a spin-off of the highly popular Dallas. Though slow to start, the series eventually became a ratings hit and became one of the longest-running American primetime dramas ever, lasting for a total of 14 seasons from 1979 to 1993. Due to her long-running tenure, Lee's alter ego is often credited as being the center of the program. Television personality Joan Rivers commented that Lee was, in theory, the "First Lady of Knots Landing" during her guest appearance on The Late Show, then hosted by Rivers. The characters of the serial often represented what was happening in society at the time. Lee acknowledged that, saying, "Karen wanted to be a Pollyanna and wasn't ashamed of that. Remember in our society...when we could go over to other people's houses and come in through an open back door? I remember when I was a little girl and my mother and father would have people over and they'd walk into an unlocked door in our house." Lee was the only performer to appear in all of the show's 344 episodes.

During the fall of 1982, her character met M. Patrick "Mack" MacKenzie (Kevin Dobson), who became her screen husband the following year. They would continue working together until the end of the series. Lee won the Soap Opera Digest Award for Best Lead Actress (Primetime) three times, and was also nominated for an Emmy in 1982 for "Outstanding Lead Actress in a Drama Series". In 1983, the writer and producers of Knots Landing urged her to do a storyline based on prescription drug dependency, which became one of her most prominent storylines. Six years later, Lee directed her first of several episodes of the series. In 1991, Knots Landing reached a milestone with its 300th episode. During the same season, Lee filmed her favorite scene from the series, known as the "Pollyanna Speech" among fans. In this scene, for which Lee had much input, Karen reacts strongly against the social problems of 1990s society and explains how she does not want to be a Pollyanna and see the world through rose-colored glasses, but rather wanted the world to be rose-colored.

=== Later career ===
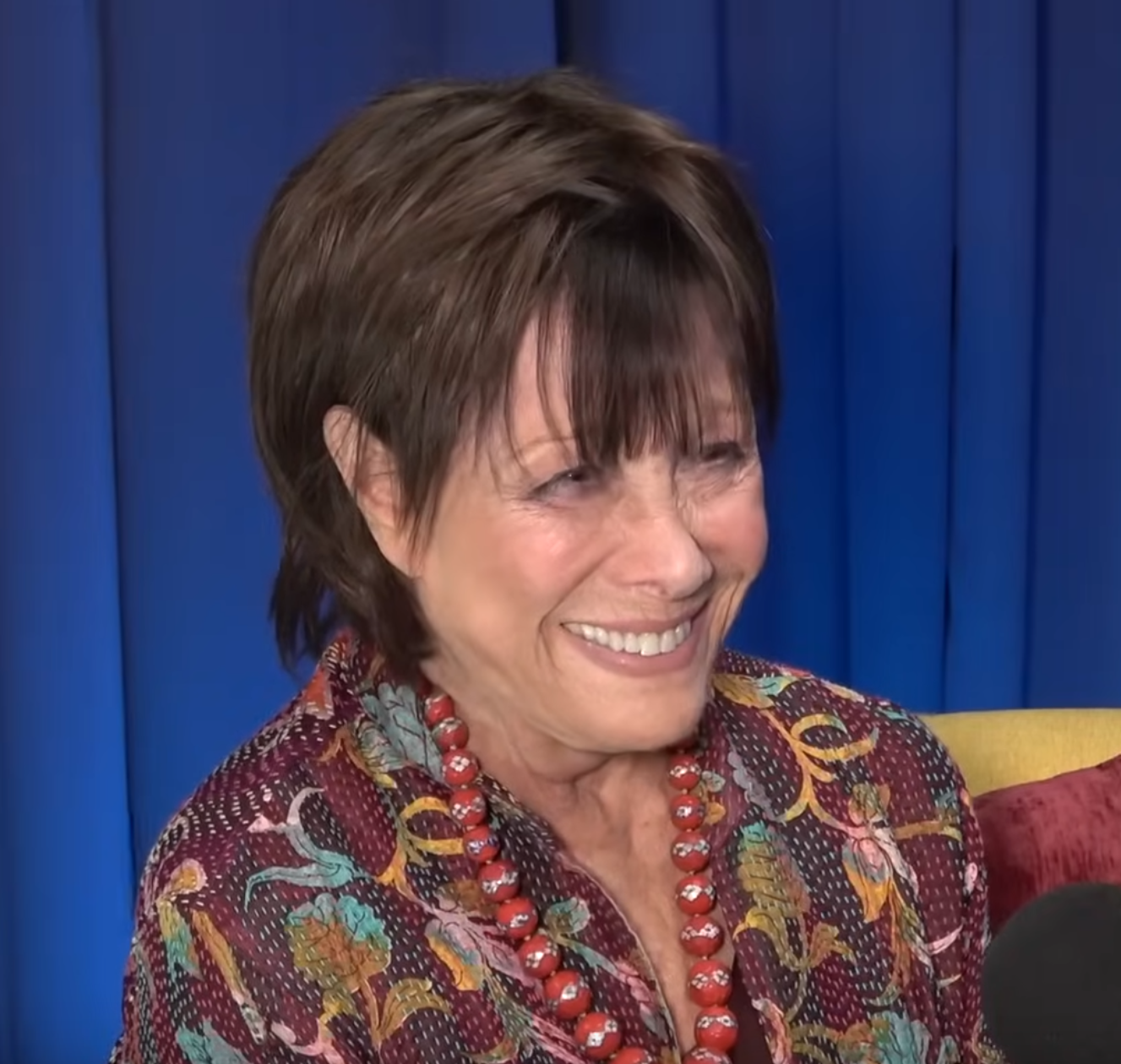
Lee in 2025

After Knots Landing ended in 1993, Lee appeared in many made-for-TV movies, including a biographical film of late country star Dottie West (Big Dreams and Broken Hearts: The Dottie West Story), which she also produced. She also became the first woman to star in, direct, and produce a TV movie for Lifetime, Color Me Perfect (1996). She was also in the reunion miniseries Knots Landing: Back to the Cul-de-Sac (1997), and portrayed novelist Jacqueline Susann in the television biopic Scandalous Me: The Jacqueline Susann Story (1998). In 2000, she returned to the Broadway stage in The Tale of the Allergist's Wife and received a 2001 Tony Award nomination for Best Featured Actress in a Play.

In 2004, Lee returned to feature films in the role of Ben Stiller's character's mother in Along Came Polly. She guest-starred alongside Chita Rivera in a February 2005 episode of Will & Grace. Also in 2005, she reunited with her Knots Landing co-stars for the nonfiction special Knots Landing Reunion: Together Again, in which the actors reminisced about their time on the hit series. That same year she appeared alongside Tyne Daly, Leslie Uggams, Christine Baranski and Karen Ziemba for the Kennedy Center Honor of Julie Harris. In 2010, Lee did voice work for an episode of the animated comedy series Family Guy.

Lee returned to Broadway in 2015 to star as Madame Morrible in the musical Wicked.

In 2025, Lee reunited with KL co-stars Joan Van Ark and Donna Mills for the episodic podcast We're Knot Done Yet, available on streaming platforms such as Podbean, YouTube and Spotify.

== Personal life ==
In 1963, Lee met actor James Farentino on the set of the play How to Succeed in Business Without Really Trying, and in 1966, they were married. They have a son, David Farentino. Lee and Farentino divorced in 1983. She has been married to writer/producer Fred Rappaport since 1987.

== Filmography ==
Years	Title	Role	Notes
1961	The Many Loves of Dobie Gillis	Lila	Episode: "Crazylegs Gillis"
1961	The Red Skelton Show	Peaches Laverne	Episode: "A New York Stripper Is Not Always a Steak"
1967	How to Succeed in Business Without Really Trying	Rosemary Pilkington	
1968–1974	The Carol Burnett Show	Special Guest appearances	
1969	The Love Bug	Carole Bennett	
1969	Roberta	Stephanie	
1969	The Comic	Mary Gibson	
1971	Night Gallery	Joanna Lowell	Episode: "Since Aunt Ada Came to Stay/With Apologies to Mr. Hyde/The Flip Side of Satan"
1970–1972	Marcus Welby, M.D.	Katie	3 episodes
1972	Alias Smith and Jones	Georgette Sinclair	3 episodes
1972	Of Thee I Sing	Diana Devereaux	Adaptation of the Gershwin musical produced by CBS as a special
1971–1973	Love, American Style	Various	5 episodes
1974	The Michele Lee Show	Michele Burton	Pilot for a CBS sitcom
1974	Only with Married Men	Jill Garrett	
1976	Dark Victory	Dolores Marsh	
1978	Having Babies	Lucy	Episode: "Sterile Wife"
1978	Bud and Lou	Anne Costello	
1978–1979	Fantasy Island	Nancy Weston / Carol DeAngelo	2 episodes
1979	Nutcracker Fantasy	Narrator	Voice
1977–1982	The Love Boat	Various	6 episodes
1985	A Letter to Three Wives	Rita Phipps	
1989	Single Women Married Men	Susan Parmel	
1990	The Fatal Image	Barbara Brennan	
1991	My Son Johnny	Marianne Cortino	
1992	Broadway Bound	Blanche	
1992	When No One Would Listen	Jessica Cochran	
1979–1993	Knots Landing	Karen Cooper Fairgate MacKenzie	Series regular, 344 episodes
1995	Something Wilder	Joanna	Episode: "The Ex Files"
1995	Big Dreams and Broken Hearts: The Dottie West Story	Dottie West	
1996	Color Me Perfect	Dina Blake	
1997	Knots Landing: Back to the Cul-de-Sac	Karen MacKenzie	TV Mini-Series
1998	Scandalous Me: The Jacqueline Susann Story	Jacqueline Susann	
1999	A Murder on Shadow Mountain	Barbara Traynor	
2000	Grandma Got Run Over by a Reindeer	Cousin Mel	Voice
2003	Miss Match	Sandy	Episode: "Addicted to Love"
2004	Along Came Polly	Vivian Feffer	
2004	Married to the Kellys	Maggie Wagner	Episode: "Kansas v. Tom's Parents"
2005	Will & Grace	Lucille	Episode: "Dance Cards & Greeting Cards"
2010	Family Guy	Estelle Lewis (voice)	Episode: "Extra Large Medium"
2013	See Dad Run	Maggie Hobbs	Episode: "See Dad See Through Grandma"
2013	How to Live with Your Parents (For the Rest of Your Life)	Caroline	Episode: "How to Help the Needy"

== Discography ==
- A Taste of the Fantastic Michele Lee (Columbia, 1966) -arranged by Ray Ellis
- L. David Sloane And Other Hits Of Today (Columbia, 1968) -arranged by Bill Justis

=== As member of casts of musicals ===
- How to Succeed in Business Without Really Trying (RCA Victor, 1961) (original Broadway cast)
- Bravo Giovanni (Columbia Masterworks, 1962) (Cast recording|original Broadway cast)
- How to Succeed in Business Without Really Trying (United Artists Records, 1967)
- Seesaw (Buddah, 1973) (original Broadway cast)

Madame Morrible Wicked the musical 2015 and revival

== Awards and nominations ==
Year	Award	Category	Work	Result
1973	Drama Desk Award	Outstanding Performance	Seesaw	Won
1974	Tony Award	Best Actress in a Musical	Seesaw	Nominated
1982	Primetime Emmy Award	Outstanding Lead Actress in a Drama Series	Knots Landing	Nominated
1986	Soap Opera Digest Award	Favorite Super Couple on a Prime Time Serial	Knots Landing	Won
1986	Soap Opera Digest Award	Outstanding Actress in a Leading Role on a Prime Time Serial	Knots Landing	Nominated
1988	Soap Opera Digest Award	Favorite Super Couple: Prime Time	Knots Landing	Won
1988	Soap Opera Digest Award	Outstanding Actress in a Leading Role: Prime Time	Knots Landing	Won
1991	Soap Opera Digest Award	Outstanding Actress in a Leading Role: Prime Time	Knots Landing	Won
1992	Soap Opera Digest Award	Outstanding Actress in a Leading Role: Prime Time	Knots Landing	Won
1998	Hollywood Walk of Fame	Star on the Walk of Fame; On November 19, 1998, at 6363 Hollywood Blvd.		Won
2001	Tony Award	Best Featured Actress in a Play	The Tale of the Allergist's Wife	Nominated
2009	TV Land Award	Anniversary Award	Knots Landing	Won
