= Feminine Fancy =

Studio album by Dottie West
- Released: December 1968
- Recorded: September 1968
- Studio: RCA Studio B (Nashville, Tennessee)
- Genre: Country; Nashville Sound
- Length: 32:04
- Label: RCA Victor
- Producer: Chet Atkins

Dottie West chronology
Country Girl (1968)	Feminine Fancy (1968)	Dottie and Don (1969)

Feminine Fancy is a studio album by American country music artist Dottie West. It was released in December 1968 and was produced by Chet Atkins. The album was West's tenth studio recording and third to be released in 1968. It was the third album of West's career to not include any singles. Most of the album's 12 tracks were cover versions of country and pop hits of the era.

== Background and content ==
Feminine Fancy was recorded in September 1968 at RCA Studio B, located in Nashville, Tennessee. The sessions were produced by Chet Atkins, West's longtime producer on the RCA Victor label. The project consisted of 12 tracks, most of which were cover versions of country and pop hits by female artists. The album's name was derived from the female recordings that West covered for the project. Country songs covered on the album included "The End of the World" by Skeeter Davis, "Harper Valley PTA" by Jeannie C. Riley and "Tennessee Waltz" by Patti Page. Pop songs covered for the album included "It Must Be Hime" by Vikki Carr, "I'm Sorry" by Brenda Lee and "Broken Hearted Melody" by Sarah Vaughan. One new song composed by West and songwriter Red Lane was also included.

== Release and chart performance ==
Feminine Fancy was originally released in December 1968, becoming West's tenth studio project and third to be issued that year. It was originally issued as a vinyl LP, featuring six songs on each side of the record. It was later reissued to digital and streaming services in April 2018 via Sony Music Entertainment. The album spent three weeks on the Billboard Top Country Albums chart before peaking at number 39 in March 1969. The album did not spawn any known singles, becoming West's third studio record to do so.

== Track listing ==
=== Original vinyl version ===
Side one
No.	Title	Writer(s)	Original Artist	Length
1.	"It Must Be Him"	Gilbert Bécaud; Mack David	Vikki Carr	2:30
2.	"Take My Hand for Awhile"	Buffy Sainte-Marie	Buffy Sainte-Marie	2:39
3.	"The End of the World"	Sylvia Dee; Arthur Kent	Skeeter Davis	2:54
4.	"I'm Sorry"	Ronnie Self	Brenda Lee	2:23
5.	"Old Cape Cod"	Allan Jeffrey; Claire Rothrock; Milton Yakus	Patti Page	2:31
6.	"Until It's Time for You to Go"	Buffy Sainte-Marie	Buffy Sainte-Marie	3:08

Side two
No.	Title	Writer(s)	Original Artist	Length
1.	"Broken-Hearted Melody"	Hal David; Sherman Edwards	Sarah Vaughan	2:30
2.	"D-I-V-O-R-C-E"	Bobby Braddock; Curly Putman	Tammy Wynette	2:46
3.	"Harper Valley PTA"	Tom T. Hall	Jeannie C. Riley	3:08
4.	"Love Is Just a Pain in the Heart"	Red Lane; Dottie West	Dottie West	2:46
5.	"Tennessee Waltz"	Pee Wee King; Redd Stewart	Patti Page	2:10
6.	"Come on Home"	Jack Rhodes; George Richey	Tammy Wynette	2:23

=== Digital version ===
Feminine Fancy (2018)
No.	Title	Writer(s)	Original Artist	Length
1.	"It Must Be Him"	Bécaud; David	Vikki Carr	2:30
2.	"Take My Hand for Awhile"	Sainte-Marie	Buffy Sainte-Marie	2:39
3.	"The End of the World"	Dee; Kent	Skeeter Davis	2:54
4.	"I'm Sorry"	Self	Brenda Lee	2:23
5.	"Old Cape Cod"	Jeffrey; Rothrock; Yakus	Patti Page	2:31
6.	"Until It's Time for You to Go"	Sainte-Marie	Buffy Sainte-Marie	3:08
7.	"Broken-Hearted Melody"	David; Edwards	Sarah Vaughan	2:30
8.	"D-I-V-O-R-C-E"	Braddock; Putman	Tammy Wynette	2:46
9.	"Harper Valley PTA"	Hall	Jeannie C. Riley	3:08
10.	"Love Is Just a Pain in the Heart"	Lane; West	Dottie West	2:46
11.	"Tennessee Waltz"	King; Stewart	Patti Page	2:10
12.	"Come on Home"	Rhodes; Richey	Tammy Wynette	2:23

== Personnel ==
All credits are adapted from the liner notes of Feminine Fancy.

Musical personnel

- Harold Bradley – guitar
- Buddy Harman – drums
- Grady Martin – guitar
- Bob Moore – bass
- Ferrill Morris – vibes
- The Nashville Edition – background vocals
- Jerry Reed – guitar
- Hargus "Pig" Robbins – piano
- Bill West – steel guitar
- Dottie West – lead vocals

Technical personnel

- Chet Atkins – producer
- Cam Mullins – arrangement, conductor

== Chart performance ==
Chart (1968–1969)	Peak position
US Top Country Albums (Billboard)	39

== Release history ==
Region	Date	Format	Label	Ref.
North America	December 1968	Vinyl	RCA Victor	
North America	April 6, 2018	Music download	Sony Music Entertainment	
