= The Sound of Country Music =

Studio album by Dottie West and the Heartaches
- Released: February 1967
- Recorded: November 1966
- Studio: RCA Studio
- Genre: Country; Nashville Sound
- Label: RCA Camden
- Producer: Chet Atkins; Ethel Gabriel

Dottie West and the Heartaches chronology
With All My Heart and Soul (1967)	The Sound of Country Music (1967)	Dottie West Sings Sacred Ballads (1967)

The Sound of Country Music is a studio album by American country music artist Dottie West and her band, "The Heartaches". It was released in February 1967 on RCA Camden Records. The sessions were co-produced by Chet Atkins and Ethel Gabriel. The project was West's fifth studio effort and first for the RCA Camden label. The album did not produce any singles nor reach peak positions on national charts. It was instead a collection of cover songs previously recorded by others.

== Background, content and release ==
The Sound of Country Music was part of a series of albums released by the RCA Camden label to promote country artists already signed to RCA Victor. West had been signed to the latter label since 1963 and had issued four albums since then. The sessions for the album took place in November 1966 at the RCA Studio in Nashville, Tennessee. The recording sessions were co-produced by Chet Atkins and Ethel Gabriel. It was West's first experience working with Gabriel as she had previously been under the supervision of Atkins.

The album consisted of ten tracks. RCA Camden was a considered a budget record label, which meant it would include previously released material. However, The Sound of Country Music consisted of entirely new recordings, all of which were cover versions of songs. Among the tracks West covered was "You Ain't Woman Enough" by Loretta Lynn, "Together Again" by Buck Owens and "Crazy Arms" by Ray Price. The album consisted of ten tracks. RCA Camden was a considered a budget record label, which meant it would include previously released material. However, The Sound of Country Music consisted of entirely new recordings, all of which were cover versions of songs. Among the tracks West covered was "You Ain't Woman Enough" by Loretta Lynn, "Together Again" by Buck Owens and "Crazy Arms" by Ray Price.

The Sound of Country Music was released in February 1967 on RCA Camden, becoming her fifth studio recording. On the record's release, her backing band (The Heartaches) received equal billing. It was issued as a vinyl LP, consisting of five songs on each side of the record. The album did not reach any peak positions on national publication charts, notably Billboard. It also did not spawn any singles to radio.

== Track listing ==
Side one
No.	Title	Writer(s)	Original Artist	Length
1.	"You Ain't Woman Enough"	Loretta Lynn	Loretta Lynn	2:08
2.	"Together Again"	Buck Owens	Buck Owens	2:06
3.	"Pick Me Up on Your Way Down"	Harlan Howard	Charlie Walker	2:29
4.	"Someone Before Me"	Bobby Hicks	Loretta Lynn	2:41
5.	"I Don't Hurt Anymore"	Don Robertson; Jack Rollins	Hank Snow	2:14

Side two
No.	Title	Writer(s)	Original Artist	Length
1.	"Heartaches by the Number"	Howard	Ray Price	2:27
2.	"City Lights"	Bill Anderson	Ray Price	2:24
3.	"Slowly"	Tommy Hill; Webb Pierce	Webb Pierce	2:01
4.	"Crazy Arms"	Ralph Mooney; Charles Seals	Ray Price	2:56
5.	"I Miss You Already"	Marvin Rainwater; Faron Young	Faron Young	2:51

== Personnel ==
All credits are adapted from the liner notes of The Sound of Country Music.

Musical personnel

- Harold Bradley – guitar
- Ray Edenton – guitar
- Buddy Harman – drums
- Roy Huskey – bass
- Tommy Jackson – fiddle
- Grady Martin – guitar
- Hargus "Pig" Robbins – piano
- Dottie West – lead vocals
- Bill West – steel guitar

Technical personnel

- Chet Atkins – producer
- Ethel Gabriel – producer
- Bill Vandevort – engineering

== Release history ==
Region	Date	Format	Label	Ref.
North America	February 1967	Vinyl	RCA Camden	
