= There's a Story (Goin' 'Round) =

Single by Dottie West and Don Gibson
- B-side: "Lock, Stock, and Teardrops"
- Released: November 1969
- Genre: Country
- Length: 2:40
- Label: RCA Records
- Songwriter(s): Don Gibson
- Producer(s): Danny Davis

Dottie West singles chronology
"Clinging to My Baby's Hand" (1969)	"There's a Story (Goin' 'Round)" (1969)	"I Heard Our Song" (1970)

Don Gibson singles chronology
"I Will Always" (1969)	"There's a Story (Goin' 'Round)" (1969)	"Don't Take All Your Loving" (1970)

"There's a Story (Goin' 'Round)" is a song recorded by American country music artists Dottie West and Don Gibson. It was released in November 1969 and peaked at number 7 on the Billboard Hot Country Singles chart. The single was never released on an official album.

== Chart performance ==
Chart (1969–1970)	Peak position
U.S. Billboard Hot Country Singles	7
