= Dottie West =

American country music singer and songwriter (1932–1991)

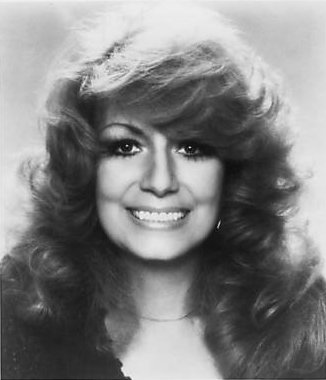
- West in a promotional photograph, 1977
- Born: October 11, 1932; Frog Pond, Tennessee, U.S.
- Died: September 4, 1991 (aged 58); Nashville, Tennessee, U.S.
- Education: Tennessee Polytechnic Institute
- Occupations: Singer; songwriter; actress
- Years active: 1956–1991
- Spouses: Bill West (m. 1953; div. 1972); Byron Metcalf (m. 1973; div. 1981); Al Winters (m. 1983; div. 1990)
- Children: 4, including Shelly
- Awards: Awards and nominations
- Musical career
- Origin: McMinnville, Tennessee, U.S.
- Genres: Country; Nashville sound; country pop
- Instruments: Vocals; guitar
- Labels: Starday; Atlantic; RCA Victor; United Artists–Liberty; Permian

Dottie West (born Dorothy Marie Marsh; October 11, 1932 – September 4, 1991) was an American country singer and songwriter. She also had several credits as an actress. A distinguished figure in the country genre, West was among several women who helped to elevate the platform of the genre's female artists. She was also known for mentoring up-and-coming artists and being the first woman to win a country music accolade from the Grammy Awards.

West's exposure to country music in childhood influenced her continued music education at Tennessee Polytechnic Institute. After she married, the family moved to Ohio, where she made her first appearances singing on regional television. Her aspirations to write and record country led to her obtaining a Starday Records recording contract in 1959. West and her family then moved to Nashville, Tennessee, where she continued recording and releasing unsuccessful singles for Starday. In 1963, she signed with RCA Victor, with which she had her first success. Her self-penned "Here Comes My Baby" (1964) became a top-10 US country song and won her a Grammy. Writing and co-writing her own material, she had more top-10 Nashville Sound-influenced singles such as "Would You Hold It Against Me", "Paper Mansions", and "Rings of Gold".

West continued recording for RCA through 1976, having a crossover pop single with 1973's "Country Sunshine". The latter was also a Coca-Cola commercial jingle that was played routinely on television. Moving to United Artists Records (which later bought Liberty Records), West had her peak success in her middle age. In the late 1970s she recorded two albums with Kenny Rogers. Their first duet, "Every Time Two Fools Collide" (1978), became West's first chart-topping single and was followed by four more top-10 songs. The newfound success led to her own solo career reigniting. She had her first chart-topping solo single in 1980 with "A Lesson in Leavin'", which was followed by several more top-20 songs.

In the early 1980s West began an acting career, appearing in television shows such as The Love Boat and films such as The Aurora Encounter. She signed a new recording contract with Permian Records, on which label her last album was released in 1984. She continued appearing on television and touring. However, West's increased spending habits led to her filing for bankruptcy in 1990. Her personal possessions were sold in a public auction by the Internal Revenue Service, and she was forced to sell her home. While in the midst of planning a career comeback, she was killed in a car accident in 1991. Following her death, her life was made into a television movie, Big Dreams and Broken Hearts: The Dottie West Story, and she was inducted into the Country Music Hall of Fame.

== Early life ==
Dorothy Marie Marsh was born in Frog Pond, Tennessee, a community roughly 64 miles (103 km) northeast of Nashville in Macon County. She was the eldest of 10 children born to Pelina Artha (née Jones) and William Hollis Marsh. Hollis Marsh was a musician who played the guitar and fiddle. Pelina Marsh was a homemaker, but also worked various odd jobs to support the family. Hollis suffered from alcoholism, which caused him to become abusive and unable to hold a job. The Marsh family lived a reportedly impoverished life, often running out of food and other resources. In Dorothy's early years, the family lived in dilapidated homes. At one point, a new home was being constructed by Pelina's extended family, but was burnt to the ground by Hollis before its completion.

Hollis Marsh was drafted during World War II, but was discharged after three months. The family received military allotment checks, which provided enough financial stability to build their own home. Pelina Marsh then took on a job at a tree nursery to provide for her children. Being the oldest child, Dorothy took on the responsibility of caring for her younger siblings while her mother worked. Dorothy and Pelina also worked in the fields of their neighbor's farm, picking fruits and vegetables. When she was 12, Dorothy raised money through a school fundraiser to buy her first guitar.

During her teen years, Dorothy attended Central High School in McMinnville, Tennessee. During this period, her father continued abusing alcohol and physically abusing his children, including Dorothy. On some occasions, Hollis Marsh would hold his wife and children at gunpoint. Around the age of 11, Dorothy began being repeatedly molested by her father; she was too afraid to report this. The abuse continued for several years, and she spoke little of it during her lifetime. As a result of the sexual abuse, Dorothy had a miscarriage when she was 15.

When she was 17, her father had found a job working for the Ford Motor Company in Detroit, Michigan. He threatened to take Dorothy out of school so she could move to Detroit with him. After being told the news by her father, Dorothy became uncontrollably emotional at school. The same day, she confessed the molestation to her high-school teachers. Hollis Marsh was then arrested on rape and incest charges. Dorothy subsequently went to live with the county sheriff for several weeks, while her mother moved the family into a McMinnville apartment. Dorothy later testified in court against her father. Hollis was ultimately found guilty of all charges and sentenced to 40 years at Tennessee State Prison. He died in prison in 1967.

Dorothy moved back into her mother's McMinnville apartment. Her mother had to go on welfare to support her family. Along with her mother, Dorothy became a waitress at a local restaurant. Her mother moved the family into a house and opened up her own restaurant in McMinnville. During this time, Dorothy began going by the name of Dottie. She also began singing and playing guitar in a high-school band called the Coonskins. The group played at high school events, square dances, picnics, and other local events. Following high-school graduation, a McMinnville businessman got Dottie a music scholarship to attend Tennessee Polytechnic Institute. During her first day, Dottie met fellow student and steel guitar player Bill West, whom she later married. As a result, she changed her name to Dottie West.

== Career ==
=== 1956–1962: Regional TV in Ohio and beginnings in Nashville ===
In 1956, the West family moved to Cleveland, Ohio. Bill West found work in a steel facility and Dottie obtained a five-year contract on the regional country music television program Landmark Jamboree. On the show, West formed a singing duo called the Kay-Dots with Kathy Dee. The Landmark Jamboree often had mainstream country artists appear, including the Carter Sisters, with whom West worked later. West also had aspirations of mainstream country stardom herself. Along with her husband and children, the family spent numerous weekends traveling to Nashville, where she attempted to score a recording contract. On one 1959 trip, West went into every Nashville record label, but still could not get signed. Feeling discouraged, the family was about to drive back to Cleveland, when they spotted the office of Starday Records. Auditioning live for Starday's Don Pierce, she was signed to the label on the spot.

One week later, West self-financed $511 to record her first Starday single titled "An Angel on Paper". The single, along with several further releases, failed to gain commercial success. However, the recording did receive occasional local Nashville airplay. Ott Devine of the Grand Ole Opry heard the song and had West make her debut appearance on the show in 1960. She traveled with her family for several more sporadic Opry appearances during the year. After saving nearly a $1000, the West family officially moved to Nashville in 1961. They temporarily lived with West's in-laws before finding their own small house in West Nashville. The same year, West was hired by booking agent Lucky Moeller, who arranged her first tours and shows in the United States.

During this period, West and her husband met aspiring Nashville songwriters Hank Cochran, Red Lane, Roger Miller, Willie Nelson, and Justin Tubb. The family often brought songwriters back to their home, where West would cook for them and in return learn to write songs. West also became close friends with Patsy Cline during this time. Struggling financially, Cline on occasion brought the Wests on the road with her to help provide work. West also toured with several other Grand Ole Opry performers, and was now being managed by the Jim Denny Artist Bureau. In July 1962, she moved to Atlantic Records, becoming the first country music artist on the label's roster. However, the label also failed to generate any commercial success for her.

According to West, the first song she ever wrote was "Is This Me?". She then recorded a demonstration tape with the help of steel guitarist Pete Drake. "Is This Me?" was heard by Jim Reeves, who chose to record it. Released as a single, the song became a commercial success for Reeves in 1963. Reeves liked West's singing voice, and brought her to the attention of Chet Atkins of RCA Victor. Atkins signed her to his label shortly afterward. "Dottie was the best female singer in town [Nashville] and everybody knew it," he later said.

=== 1963–1968: "Here Comes My Baby" and success at RCA Victor ===
West's first RCA Victor recordings were released as singles in 1963: "Touch Me" and "Let Me off at the Corner". The latter became her first to make the US country chart reaching number 29. Her next release, "Love Is No Excuse", was a duet with Jim Reeves that reached the top 10. Yet, her next single was considered West's breakthrough solo recording: "Here Comes My Baby". Co-written by West and her husband, it reached number 10 on the US country chart in late 1964. "Here Comes My Baby" led to West winning the first-ever Grammy award given to a female country artist and a membership to the Grand Ole Opry. "Here Comes My Baby" was then included on West's debut studio album of the same name (1965), which was produced by Chet Atkins and included five self-composed songs. The disc reached number 12 on the US country albums chart, as did her next studio album, Dottie West Sings. Her follow-up singles reached the US country top 40 through 1966: "Didn't I", "Gettin' Married Has Made Us Strangers", "No Sign of Living", and "Before the Ring on Your Finger Turns Green".

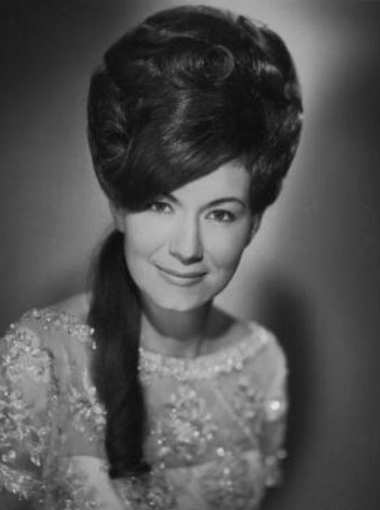
West c. 1965

By this point, West was being highlighted by critics for her "heart-wrenching" self-penned lyrics and her emotional vocal performances. Her third album, Suffer Time (1966), was conceptualized from West's new musical style. The characters of its songs were often victims of heartache and failing relationships. The disc was her highest-charting yet, reaching number three on the US country chart. It also spawned four chart singles. The second single, "Would You Hold It Against Me", reached the top five of the US country chart. With Chet Atkins still serving as West's producer, the pair recorded three studio albums that were issued in 1967: With All My Heart and Soul, Dottie West Sings Sacred Ballads, and I'll Help You Forget Her. With All My Heart and Soul reached the US country top 10, while I'll Help You Forget Her charted at number 11. The albums included the top-10 single "Paper Mansions" and the top-20 single "Like a Fool".

Now in popular demand, West formed her own touring band called the Heartaches. It featured Bill West on steel guitar, along with Bobby Taylor, Ray Wix, and Danny Shannon. West and the Heartaches toured frequently across the United States and Canada, often performing at state fairs, auditoriums, and occasionally headlining venues like the Black Poodle Club in Nashville. Her 1967 album The Sound of Country Music gave dual credit to West and her new band. West also appeared in two country music-themed films during this time: Second Fiddle to a Steel Guitar and There's a Still on the Hill. RCA continued releasing new material of West's, as well. In 1968, the label released the studio LPs What I'm Cut Out to Be, Country Girl, and Feminine Fancy. All three discs reached the US country albums chart. The same year, the singles "Country Girl" and "Reno" became US top-20 country songs and top-10 songs on the Canadian RPM country chart.

=== 1969–1976: Collaborations, "Country Sunshine", and commercial decline ===
As West's career progressed, she was chosen as a collaborator on duets for male country artists. She first collaborated with Don Gibson on several duet recordings that were released on the 1969 album Dottie and Don. The project was her final with Chet Atkins. Their first collaborative single was 1969's "Rings of Gold", which reached number two on the US country chart and topped the Canadian country chart. It was followed by "Sweet Memories" (later recorded by Willie Nelson) and "There's a Story (Goin' 'Round)". The latter was a top-10 country single in the US. In 1971, she joined Jimmy Dean on the single "Slowly", which made the US country top 30. The duo also recorded an album of duets titled Country Boy & Country Girl. Together, Dean and West played the Landmark and Golden Nugget hotels in Las Vegas.

West also continued recording solo material. Between 1970 and 1972, RCA Victor released the charting singles "Clingin' to My Baby's Hand", "Careless Hands", "Lonely Is", and "I'm Only a Woman". Among the highest-charting was 1970's "Forever Yours", which climbed to number 21 on the US country chart. Its corresponding studio album reached the US country top 40. By the early 1970s, critics noticed an increasing emotional vocal delivery from West on her recordings. Robert K. Oermann and Mary A. Bufwack wrote that West developed a "moaning quality that she began using to great emotional effect". AllMusic's Bill Carpenter found her 1971 single "Six Weeks Every Summer (Christmas Every Other Year)" to have both "substance" and "passion". In the latter (whose story line is based on a single mother), West reportedly cried during its recording session. This was followed by the top-30 US country single "If It's All Right with You". It was included on West's 1973 studio album, which featured West's new husband Byron Metcalf on the cover.

In the early 1970s, Coca-Cola advertising executives heard West's 1968 song "Country Girl". In turn, West agreed to compose and record commercial jingles for Coca-Cola. In 1972, the company adapted "Country Girl" into a jingle that was played routinely as a television commercial. As a result, the company gave West a lifetime contract to make jingles for Coke. A follow-up jingle was co-written with Billy Davis called "Country Sunshine". The McCann Ericson television commercial had become so popular with audiences that it was adapted into a RCA Victor single. Released in 1973, the single version reached number two on the US country chart and crossed over to number 49 on the US Hot 100. It also made similar positions in Canada. A studio album of the same name made it to number 17 on the US country albums chart.

In 1974, West had a second US top-10 country single with "Last Time I Saw Him". Her follow-up releases failed to gain the same momentum and West's commercial popularity began declining. Her next studio album, House of Love, spawned two top-40 singles, the title track and "Lay Back Lover". However, further singles released through 1976 reached positions outside the US country top 40. West's final RCA album, Carolina Cousins (1975), only reached number 45 on the US country chart. In 1976, West departed the RCA Victor roster.

=== 1976–1983: Duets with Kenny Rogers and solo comeback ===
In 1976, West signed with United Artists Records and started recording with Larry Butler. Her first label release was the top-20 US and Canadian country single "When It's Just You and Me" (1976). Its album of the same name made the US country top 50. It also spawned the top-40 songs "Every Word I Write" and "Tonight You Belong to Me". Following this, West was putting finishing touches on a new track called "Every Time Two Fools Collide", when her session was interrupted by Kenny Rogers (who was waiting to use the studio next). After informally singing the song together, the pair realized it could be a duet. Ultimately, they decided the track would be cut as a duet. In 1978, their duet version of "Every Time Two Fools Collide" became West's first number-one US country single. The pair then released two studio albums of duets: Every Time Two Fools Collide (1978) and Classics (1979). Both discs became the first in West's career to sell half a million copies, receiving certifications from the Recording Industry Association of America.

The duo's collaborative success resulted in West's own commercial resurgence. The pairing had three more top-10 and chart-topping country singles through 1979: "Anyone Who Isn't Me Tonight", "All I Ever Need Is You", and "'Til I Can Make It on My Own". For the first time in her career, West headlined sports arenas and large concert venues. This included Rogers and West co-hosting an NBC television special dubbed The World's Largest Indoor Country Music Show and included 60,000 fans. Alongside Rogers, she also made some of her first appearances on nationally televised programs including The Tonight Show Starring Johnny Carson. In 1978 and 1979, the pair won back-to-back Vocal Duo of the Year accolades from the Country Music Association Awards. West also made changes to her image by getting plastic surgery and purchasing $100,000 spandex outfits designed by Bob Mackie.

Although finding renewed popularity as a duo, West's solo material was failing to have the same commercial momentum. She became increasingly frustrated with the lack of "excitement" in her solo recordings. Ultimately, West decided to make changes to both her management and musical style. In 1979, she signed with Rogers' management team, Kragen and Co. She also replaced Larry Butler with the newly established record producers Randy Goodrum and Brent Maher. The Goodrum-Maher pair produced and wrote songs for West. Together, they reworked her musical style to help her identify with contemporary audiences. The result was West's 1979 album Special Delivery. Critics took notice of its new approach and found it to incorporate a soul influence. The disc climbed to number 13 on the US country chart. From the disc came the top 20 US country singles "You Pick Me Up (And Put Me Down)" and "Leavin's for Unbelievers". Its most successful 1980's "A Lesson in Leavin'", which became the first solo single in West's career to top the US country chart.

Now in her late 40s, West had reached the peak of her career. She was a solo concert headline, often doing close to 300 dates a year. In 1980, West had her own television special, which aired on the Showtime network, also titled Special Delivery. Liberty Records released her next studio project called Wild West (1981). Featuring her wearing skin tight pants and a cowgirl hat on the cover, it climbed to the number-five position on the US country chart. Cashbox praised its song selection and believed it to have crossover potential. Spawned from the album was "Are You Happy Baby?", West's second solo single to reach the number-one spot. It was followed by another chart-topper called "What Are We Doin' in Love" (a duet with Kenny Rogers). The latter crossed over into the pop field, becoming her highest-charting song on the US Hot 100, peaking at number 14 in 1981. It also made the Canadian country top five and Canadian adult contemporary top 10.

In 1982, West co-hosted the 17th Academy of Country Music Awards alongside Mickey Gilley and Conway Twitty. In 1983, West (who was a lifelong active Democrat) performed on the party's syndicated telethon "Celebrate America". Along with more television appearances, West started to dabble in acting. She appeared on an episode of The Love Boat, and played the voice of Melissa Raccoon in the film The Raccoons and the Lost Star. She also portrayed Mona in the traveling stage production of The Best Little Whorehouse in Texas. At age 50, West shot a photo spread for the adult magazine Oui. The same year, the single "It's High Time" reached the US country top 20. It was the lead release from her 1981 studio album High Time, which made the US country top 50. In 1982, the Liberty label released the album Full Circle, which was produced by Larry Gatlin. West's second TV special aired on Showtime in 1982 and was also named Full Circle. Her final Liberty album was released in 1983 titled New Horizons, which only reached the US country top 70. Both Full Circle and New Horizons spawned West's final top-40 singles: "You're Not Easy to Forget", "She Can't Get My Love off the Bed", and "Tulsa Ballroom".

=== 1984–1991: Final years ===
In 1984, West signed a five-year recording contract with Permian Records. She collaborated with producer Jerry Crutchfield on her first label album titled Just Dottie (1984). Billboard found it both "sorrowful" and "sassy", while The Tennessean found the disc to have "powerful women lyrics". The album spawned West's final US charting country songs: "What's Good for the Goose (Is Good for the Gander)", "Let Love Come Lookin' for You", and "We Know Better Now". A duet taken from Kenny Rogers' Duets compilation ("Together Again") made the US country top 20 in 1984, as well. In 1986, Permian closed its doors.

In 1986, West made her film debut in the science fiction thriller The Aurora Encounter. She played the role of Irene Rutherford, a widow who is visited by extraterrestrial creatures. The film was considered "low-budget" by critics. As the 1980s progressed, West's popularity declined and her concert offerings became more sporadic. Among her professional engagements were occasional opportunities filling in as Kenny Rogers' duet partner when other female performers were unavailable. In 1989, she began working alongside her daughter Shelly West, who had her own recording career during this time.

In 1990, West declared bankruptcy and divorced her third husband, Alan Winters. She continued to perform despite her personal challenges. West's booking agent, Bobby Roberts, booked her for 80 concert gigs during 1990. She also appeared as a frequent guest on The Nashville Network and performed regularly on the Grand Ole Opry. Shortly before her 1991 death, West was planning an album of duets with Tanya Tucker and Tammy Wynette, along with an autobiography.

== Death ==
In July 1991, West lost control of a Chevrolet Camaro she was driving and crashed into a concrete wall. She was given a ticket for "careless driving" and for not wearing a seat belt. A second car accident a month later would take her life. On August 30, 1991, West was running late for a scheduled performance at the Grand Ole Opry. While driving herself to the venue, West's vehicle stalled. West then flagged down a passing driver, who happened to be her neighbor George Thackston. He agreed to drive her to the Opry. While attempting to take the Opryland highway exit ramp off of Tennessee State Route 155 (Briley Parkway), Thackston lost control of the vehicle. The car then went airborne and hit an embankment. It was later reported that Thackston had taken the 25 mile-per-hour exit ramp at an estimated speed of 55 miles per hour.

Thackston was taken to the hospital in critical condition. Thackston survived the crash. He was later charged with reckless endangerment and pleaded no contest. He was ultimately sentenced to 11 months probation and to complete an alcohol recovery program. At the scene of the accident, West did not appear to have any injuries, but she was admitted to the hospital with a ruptured spleen and a lacerated liver. Doctors also initially believed she might have been paralyzed. At Vanderbilt University Medical Center, West underwent a 90-minute surgery and was then taken to the surgical intensive care unit. West underwent a second operation, but lost a significant amount of blood and doctors did not think she would survive. On the morning of September 4, 1991, West was being prepared for her next surgery. Her heart stopped on the operating table at 9:43 am, and she was unable to be revived. She was 58 years old.

West's funeral was held at Nashville's Christ Church on September 7, 1991. West was honored by her granddaughters with an original song paying tribute to her, which was played at the funeral. Steve Wariner sang "Amazing Grace" during the services. Kenny Rogers eulogized her in a speech: "When she sang about pain, she felt pain; when she sang about love, she felt love; when she sang about beauty, she felt that beauty. While some performers sang words, she sang emotions." West was then buried at Mount View Cemetery in her hometown of McMinnville.

== Personal life ==
=== Marriages and children ===
West was married and divorced three times. Her first marriage was to Bill West in 1953, whom she met on her first day of classes at Tennessee Tech. The couple wed during her sophomore year and were pictured together in their 1953 college yearbook. Bill was also a steel guitarist who became a member of his wife's touring band and co-wrote many of her early songs. In their first years in Nashville, the Wests rented a pink cottage on the west side of the city. A home they later bought in Nashville caught fire in 1969. The family then purchased a home located in the Green Hills neighborhood of Nashville. In 1972, the Wests divorced. Dottie later claimed that she caught Bill cheating on her. Bill West died in 2013.

The Wests had three children together by 1958: Morris, Kerry, and Shelly. Their fourth child Dale was born in 1962. The couple's children also became involved with the music business. Kerry West became an audio engineer and found employment running sound equipment during shows for Ronnie Milsap. Mo West was a songwriter and guitarist, notably for the American rock band Thunder, which was briefly signed to Atlantic Records. Shelly West was a recording artist during the 1980s, topping the US country charts as a duet team with David Frizzell and as a solo artist.

In 1972, West married her band's drummer, Byron Metcalf, who was 12 years younger. During their wedding ceremony, West changed the phrase "'til death do us part" to "as long as love shall last". When commenting on her new marriage, West said, "I'm attracted to younger men and I'm not afraid to admit it...I don't mind saying it. I have nothing to hide." In 1980, West filed for divorce from Metcalf, citing his drinking and infidelity. In 1981, the divorce became final. It was agreed that West would give Metcalf $55,000, along with $10,000 provided to Metcalf's lawyer. "I work. He doesn't," she told the press. In 1983, West wed sound engineer Al Winters. The couple had a 23-year age difference. In 1988, West filed for divorce, citing "irreconcilable differences" and "cruel and inhuman treatment". Their divorce became final in January 1990.

=== Financial challenges and bankruptcy ===
In her later years, West became known for her spending habits. In some instances, stores would remain open through midnight so she could shop alone. "I can spend money real quick, I'm good at that. And there's been times that maybe I spent it in a way that I shouldn't. But I've always enjoyed it," she later commented. By the 1980s, West was bringing in between one and two million dollars yearly. During this period, West purchased a colonial mansion in Williamson County, Tennessee. The home was equipped with a bowling alley, closets organized with designer clothes, and a nursery for her two grandchildren. West also had a mirror built on the ceiling above her master bed.

In August 1990, West filed for chapter 11 bankruptcy, owing the US Internal Revenue Service $1 million. She later switched to chapter seven, which allowed her to liquidate her assets. Her management company claimed West "breached" her contract and sued her for $130,000. Her former manager Michael Brokaw claimed that he was due 15% of her earnings and had yet to be paid. He sued her for $110,295. In September 1990, the First American National Bank seized her colonial mansion after previously buying it at a foreclosure sale for $800,000. Her Chevrolet Corvette was also seized and Kenny Rogers lent her a car, instead. West then moved into Nashville's Wessex Towers condominiums. Several months later, an unknown caller informed bankruptcy trustee John McLemore that West was secretly hiding personal possessions in storage to avoid their seizure by the IRS. In April 1991, several porcelain objects and a guitar were found in a storage facility.

In June 1991, the IRS held a public auction where people bought West's personal possessions. Some fans bought items and returned them to West. Items sold at the auction included West's baby grand piano and her 1976 Cadillac Fleetwood. Despite the proceeds from the auction, West was still left with debt.

== Artistry ==
=== Influences ===
From an early age, West was routinely exposed to country music. West's father routinely played the fiddle during her childhood. He often performed songs by Jimmie Rodgers on the instrument while West's mother would sing along. Because the family was one of few to own a radio, neighbors would gather at her childhood home every Saturday evening to listen to the Grand Ole Opry. Among her earliest influences were the Carter Family and the Carter Sisters. West later commented that she would cry when hearing Anita Carter's "pure, sweet voice" in the family group. She was most especially influenced by the group's matriarch, Mother Maybelle Carter. "She was very dedicated to her career, but she was also a very good mama. She really took care of those girls. I watched how she handled the business part, the stage, the performance, and the traveling."

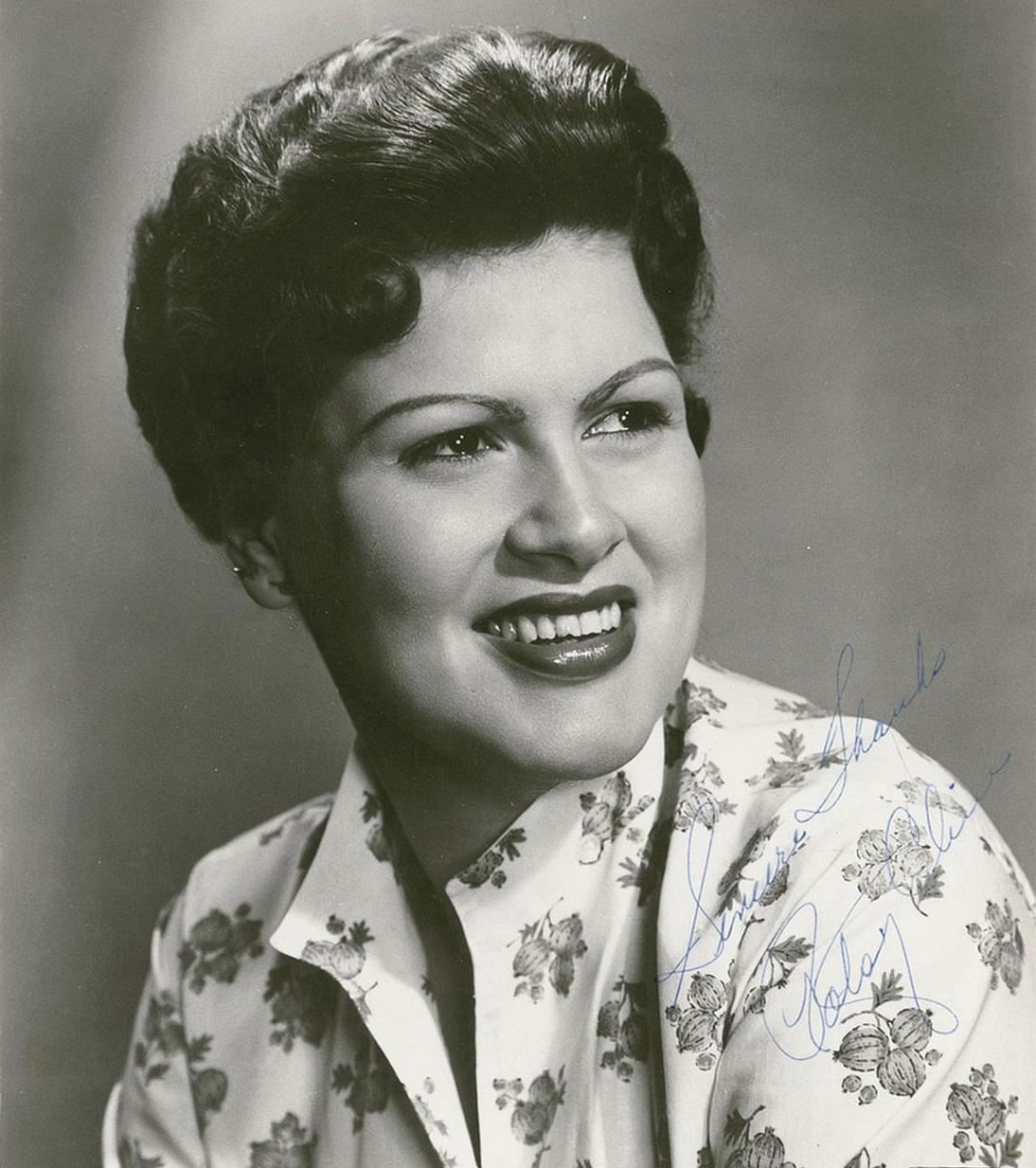
West's biggest musical influence was Patsy Cline, who was both a friend and mentor.

West's most significant musical influence was Patsy Cline. While the pair also were friends, Cline also served as a mentor to West. According to West, Cline took a "genuine interest" in her career, while also providing advice on her stage presence and vocal delivery. "I think I was most influenced by Patsy Cline. She said things for people. There was so much feeling there. In fact, she told me, 'Hoss, if you can't do it with feeling, don't'," she told writer Robert K. Oermann. West sometimes attended Cline's Decca Records recording sessions and would observe her singing and performance style. She recalled her reaction after listening to one of Cline's playbacks after a session, "You know, afterward you're supposed to say something nice. I couldn't talk. I was dumbfounded."

West sometimes worked the road with Cline. She played in what was Cline's last performance on March 3, 1963, in Kansas City, Kansas. Cline was scheduled to take an airplane alongside her road manager to Nashville, but was delayed due to poor weather conditions. Instead, she accepted an invitation from West to travel to Nashville by car. Cline was carrying her suitcase to West's car when she decided it would be faster to travel home by plane. Leaving instead on her manager's plane, Cline was killed in en route to Nashville on March 5. West recalled feeling traumatized by Cline's death. "I was sipping black coffee and saying, 'Damn it, Patsy, why didn't you come with us?," she told Cline's biographer Ellis Nassour. Until the end of her life, West kept a scrapbook given to her by Cline that was filled with mementos and memorabilia. Years later, West wrote the foreword to Cline's biography Honky Tonk Angel: The Intimate Story of Patsy Cline.

=== Mentoring younger artists ===
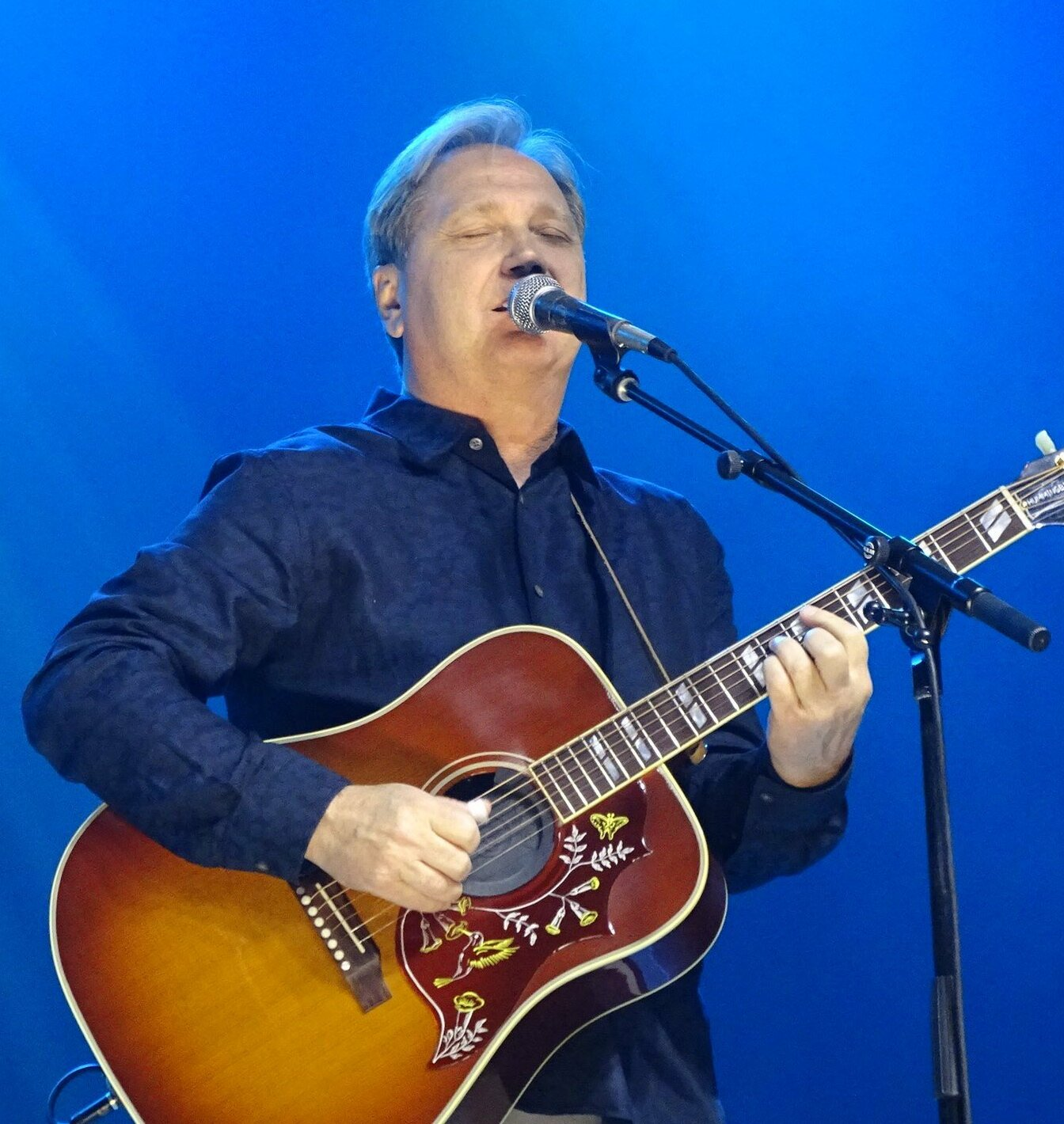
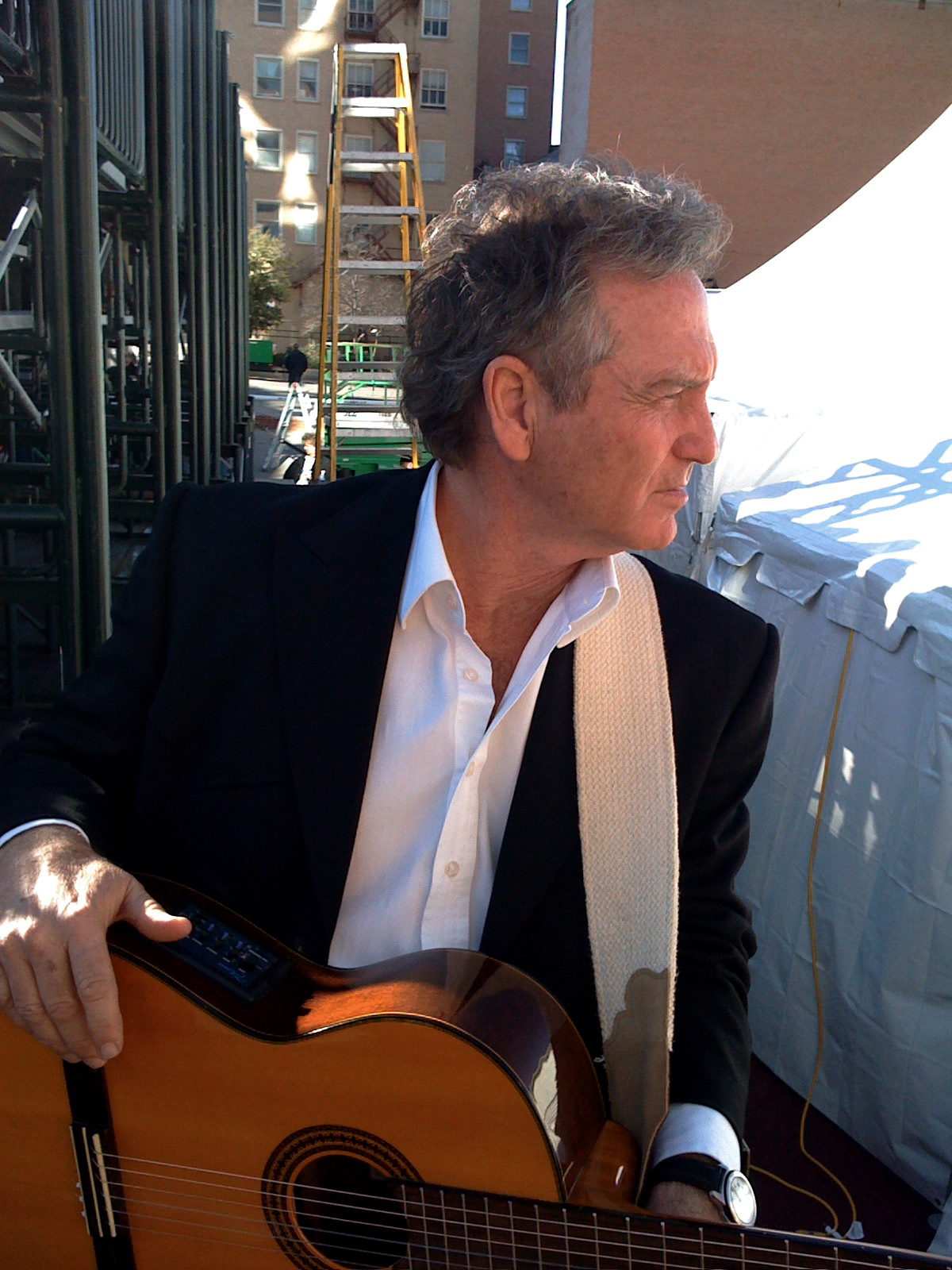
West was known for discovering up-and-coming artists, notably Steve Wariner (left) and Larry Gatlin (right).

West became known for discovering up-and-coming music artists and mentoring their early careers. She was among the first country artists to record songs by female writers. Her early albums featured songs written by Jessi Colter, Sandy Mason, and Jeannie Seely. West also recorded some of the early material Seely wrote, such as "It Just Takes Practice" and "Another Heart for You to Break". West and Seely also became close friends. The pair met at Los Angeles's Palomino Club, and Dottie encouraged Jeannie to move to Nashville. "She was such a great friend. We called each other ‘Three O'Clock in the Morning Friends,’ because if you needed to talk to someone at three in the morning, you knew they would be willing to wake up and be there for you," Seely recalled.

West discovered Steve Wariner, who would have a series of top-10 country singles during the 1980s and 1990s. Seventeen year-old Wariner was performing at the Nashville Country Club in Indianapolis, Indiana, when West interrupted his show to sing harmony with him. Wariner started playing bass in West's band and toured with her during the 1970s. Wariner also lived with West at her Nashville home for several years. "I just grew up with Dottie West," Wariner recounted. West also discovered Larry Gatlin, who also had a successful country recording career performing as "Larry Gatlin and the Gatlin Brothers". In the early 1970s Gatlin went to Las Vegas to audition for the gospel group The Imperials. As he was walking through a showroom, he caught the attention of West. After having a conversation, Gatlin pitched several songs to West, two of which she later recorded ("You're the Other Half of Me" and "Once You Were Mine"). West also encouraged Gatlin to move to Nashville and bought him a plane ticket to the city.

=== Musical styles ===
West's RCA recordings were largely identified with the Nashville Sound subgenre of country music. The Nashville Sound was a style of country that replaced traditional production with more pop-influenced instrumentation. Many Nashville Sound recordings featured orchestras, jazz-styled guitars, and four-part harmonies. West's RCA producer Chet Atkins highlighted her songwriting and vocal delivery and backed it with Nashville Sound production to help make it commercially successful. Authors Mary A. Bufwack and Robert K. Oermann described West's RCA singles "Would You Hold It Against Me" and "Paper Mansions" as "definitive Nashville Sound hits". As the Nashville Sound evolved into country pop style during the 1970s, so did West's music. Tim Sheridan of AllMusic wrote, "There are all kinds of country music: hillbilly, bluegrass, honky-tonk, etc. Dottie West is the queen of Spandex country: a slickly produced Nashville brand of country-pop."

== Legacy, influence, and achievements ==
Dottie West was considered among several artists to elevate the platform of female country artists. Robert K. Oermann compared West to that of Patsy Cline, Loretta Lynn, Dolly Parton, and Tammy Wynette, saying, "these women were American icons whose songs were about heartache and resilience. They rose from poverty to become glittering heroines." Jason Ankeny of AllMusic wrote, "West's battles for identity and respect within the male-dominated country music hierarchy were instrumental in enabling other female artists to gain control over the directions of their careers." Robert Hilburn of the Los Angeles Times wrote, "In the mid-’60s, she was one of the handful of singers, including Loretta Lynn, who helped demonstrate that females could compete on honky-tonk jukeboxes with the men who had previously dominated the field."

West is also remembered for reinventing and continuing her career in her middle age. Juli Thanki of The Tennessean wrote, "West continually reinvented herself during her career, transforming from the gingham-clad girl next door to chart-topping country bombshell." Mary A. Bufwack and Robert K. Oermann found that West had a "highly successful comeback" in her forties by taking on a "glamorous new image" and wearing "eye-popping costumes". Jason Ankeny found that West had more success in middle age due to the changing culture: "As the sexual revolution peaked, so did West's career; after the 1973 success of the crossover smash 'Country Sunshine', written for Coca-Cola, her material became far more provocative, and much to the chagrin of country purists, more commercially successful, as well."

In 1995, West's life and career were made into a television movie that aired on CBS titled Big Dreams and Broken Hearts: The Dottie West Story. West was portrayed by actress Michele Lee. It also featured cameo appearances from Loretta Lynn, Dolly Parton, Willie Nelson, and Kenny Rogers. The film was created by West's former manager Ken Kragen and Michele Lee. Lee wore many of West's original stage clothes and did her own research into West's past. The Seattle Times commented positively on Lee's singing performances for the film: "Some of the best moments in this generally entertaining movie feature Lee's impersonations of West's legendary performances." Variety praised the director's role in the film: "Director Bill D'Elia has a talented cast and successfully guides them in establishing a high credibility factor to the story usually lacking in other biopix."

In 1999, West returned to the public consciousness when Jo Dee Messina covered her number-one single "Lesson in Leavin'". A fan of West's music, Messina was inspired to record the song after watching her 1995 television movie. In reference to West's legacy, Messina told Billboard, "She had spunk. She had fire. She loved the fans, and she loved people. She was a very strong woman."

In 2002, West was named among CMT's 40 Greatest Women of Country Music, a special which ran on the network during the year. West's hometown of McMinnville, Tennessee, dedicated Highway 56 to her memory, naming it the Dottie West Memorial Highway.

In the 2010s, Jeannie Seely and Ron Harman began an effort to induct West into the Country Music Hall of Fame and Museum. Harman created a Facebook page in 2012 to bring attention to the campaign, which was titled "Dottie West Needs Inducted into the Country Music Hall of Fame". More than 15,000 users "liked" the page. In 2014, Steve Wariner wrote an op-ed for Billboard magazine citing his reasons for why West should be inducted into the Hall of Fame, as well: "In my humble opinion, Dottie helped build the template for the modern-day country girl singer. She was a true pioneer." In March 2018, it was officially announced that West would be inducted into the Country Music Hall of Fame. In October 2018, West was inducted through the Hall of Fame's official ceremony.

== Discography ==
Studio albums as a solo artist

- Here Comes My Baby (1965)
- Dottie West Sings (1965)
- Suffer Time (1966)
- With All My Heart and Soul (1967)
- Dottie West Sings Sacred Ballads (1967)
- I'll Help You Forget Her (1967)
- What I'm Cut Out to Be (1968)
- Country Girl (1968)
- Feminine Fancy (1968)
- Dottie Sings Eddy (1969)
- Makin' Memories (1969)
- Country and West (1970)
- Forever Yours (1970)
- Careless Hands (1971)
- Have You Heard...Dottie West (1971)
- I'm Only a Woman (1972)
- If It's All Right with You/Just What I've Been Looking For (1973)
- Country Sunshine (1973)
- House of Love (1974)
- Carolina Cousins (1975)
- When It's Just You and Me (1977)
- Dottie (1978)
- Special Delivery (1979)
- Wild West (1981)
- High Times (1981)
- Full Circle (1982)
- New Horizons (1983)
- Just Dottie (1984)

Studio albums as a collaboration

- The Sound of Country Music (with The Heartaches) (1967)
- Dottie and Don (with Don Gibson) (1969)
- Country Boy & Country Girl (with Jimmy Dean) (1970)
- Every Time Two Fools Collide (with Kenny Rogers) (1978)
- Classics (with Kenny Rogers) (1979)

== Filmography ==
List of film and television appearances by Dottie West, showing all relevant details
Title	Year	Role	Notes	Ref.
Second Fiddle to a Steel Guitar	1966	Herself		
The Road to Nashville	1967	Herself		
Skinflint: A Country Christmas Carol	1979	Annabelle Williams	Television movie	
Dottie West: Special Delivery	1980	Herself	Television concert special	
The Dukes of Hazzard	1981	Herself	Season 3, episode 19	
Dottie West: Full Circle	1982	Herself	Television concert special	
The Love Boat	1983	Herself	Season 6, episode 27	
The Raccoons and the Lost Star	1983	Melissa Raccoon	Television movie	
The Fall Guy	1983	Herself	Season 3, episode 10	
The Aurora Encounter	1986	Irene		
