= Dottie West Sings Sacred Ballads =

Studio album by Dottie West
- Released: July 1967
- Recorded: February 1967
- Studio: RCA Studio B (Nashville, Tennessee)
- Genre: Country; gospel
- Label: RCA Victor
- Producer: Chet Atkins

Dottie West chronology
The Sound of Country Music (1967)	Dottie West Sings Sacred Ballads (1967)	I'll Help You Forget Her (1967)

Dottie West Sings Sacred Ballads is a studio album by American country music artist Dottie West. It was released in July 1967 on RCA Victor Records and was produced by Chet Atkins. The album was West's sixth studio effort and only gospel music collection to be released during her career. The album did not spawn any singles nor did it reach positions on any national publication charts.

== Background, content and reception ==
Dottie West Sings Sacred Ballads was produced by Chet Atkins in February 1967 at the RCA Victor Studio in Nashville, Tennessee. It was West's sixth studio album recorded with Atkins and her sixth album overall. It was also her first album of gospel music to be released in her career. The album's liner notes were written by West's mother in law. On the project, her husband is featured playing steel guitar. The album contained a total of 12 tracks. All of the tracks were cover versions of well known gospel and inspirational songs. Included were renditions of "How Great Thou Art", "His Eye Is on the Sparrow", "Lord's Prayer" and "You'll Never Walk Alone".

The album was released in July 1967, becoming her third studio recording issued that year. The album was first offered as a vinyl LP, with six songs on each side of the record. It was later reissued tot digital retailers in the 2010s. The album's release was first announced in a July 1967 issue of Billboard magazine. It did not produce any singles at the time of its release nor did it appear on any Billboard album publications. The album was nominated at the 10th Annual Grammy Awards for Best Sacred Recording, becoming her seventh award nomination from the Grammy's. The album would later receive 4.5 out of 5 stars from Allmusic.

== Track listing ==
=== Original vinyl version ===
Side one
No.	Title	Writer(s)	Length
1.	"How Great Thou Art"	Traditional	3:58
2.	"I Believe"	Ervin Drake; Irvin Graham; Jimmy Shirl; Al Stillman	2:23
3.	"You'll Never Walk Alone"	Oscar Hammerstein; Richard Rodgers	2:32
4.	"I'm Grateful"	Drake; Shirl	3:28
5.	"King of Kings"	Leon Payne	3:18
6.	"Lord's Prayer"	Traditional	2:23

Side two
No.	Title	Writer(s)	Length
1.	"Lord, Is It I"	Austin Miles	2:30
2.	"His Eye Is on the Sparrow"	Traditional	3:32
3.	"In God's Eyes"	Willie Nelson	2:46
4.	"Then I Met the Master"	Mosie Lister	2:35
5.	"Where No One Stands Alone"	Lister	2:52
6.	"Savior, Again to Thy Dear Name We Raise"	John Ellerton; Edward J. Hopkins	3:15

=== Digital version ===
Dottie West Sings Sacred Ballads (2018)
No.	Title	Writer(s)	Length
1.	"How Great Thou Art"	Traditional	3:58
2.	"I Believe"	Drake; Graham; Shirl; Stillman	2:23
3.	"You'll Never Walk Alone"	Hammerstein; Rodgers	2:32
4.	"I'm Grateful"	Drake; Shirl	3:28
5.	"King of Kings"	Payne	3:18
6.	"Lord's Prayer"	Traditional	2:23
7.	"Lord, Is It I"	Miles	2:30
8.	"His Eye Is on the Sparrow"	Traditional	3:32
9.	"In God's Eyes"	Nelson	2:46
10.	"Then I Met the Master"	Lister	2:35
11.	"Where No One Stands Alone"	Lister	2:52
12.	"Savior, Again to Thy Dear Name We Raise"	Ellerton; Hopkins	3:15

== Personnel ==
All credits are adapted from the liner notes of Dottie West Sings Sacred Ballads.

Musical personnel

- Harold Bradley – guitar
- Jerry Carrigan – drums
- Floyd Cramer – piano
- Ray Edenton – guitar
- Buddy Harman – drums
- Roy Huskey – bass
- The Jordanaires – background vocals
- Grady Martin – guitar
- The Nashville A Strings – strings
- Hargus "Pig" Robbins – piano
- Henry Strzelecki – bass
- Bill West – steel guitar
- Dottie West – lead vocals

Technical personnel

- Chet Atkins – producer
- Jim Malloy – engineering

== Release history ==
Region	Date	Format	Label	Ref.
United States	July 1967	Vinyl	RCA Victor	
United States	June 29, 2018	Music download	Sony Music Entertainment	
