= Country Sunshine (song) =

Single by Dottie West

from the album Country Sunshine
- B-side: "Wish I Didn't Love You Anymore"
- Released: September 15, 1973
- Recorded: July 30, 1973
- Studio: RCA Victor Studios
- Genre: Country; Countrypolitan
- Length: 2:07
- Label: RCA Victor
- Songwriters: Billy Davis; Dottie West; Dianne Whiles
- Producer: Billy Davis

Dottie West singles chronology
"Just What I've Been Looking For" (1973)	"Country Sunshine" (1973)	"Last Time I Saw Him" (1974)

Audio
- "Country Sunshine" on YouTube

"Country Sunshine" is a song co-written and recorded by American country music artist Dottie West. It was both a Coca-Cola ad jingle and a single. The song was co-written by West, along with Billy Davis and Dianne Whiles. Its popularity as a commercial jingle led to its single release by RCA Victor in 1973. The single became among West's commercially-successful releases, reaching the top ten of the US and Canadian country charts. It also made positions on other genre charts in both countries. "Country Sunshine" has since been considered among West's most well-known recordings.

== Background and history ==
Television advertising had become a popular medium for companies to promote items. Commercial jingles had also become a way to make commercials more engaging for audiences. In the early 1970s, Coca-Cola was among the companies using jingles regularly on television. Many of the jingles had become so popular with audiences that its lyrics were reworked and released as singles that were played on radio. British pop group The New Seekers had recorded "I'd Like to Buy the World a Coke", which was re-recorded as "I'd Like to Teach the World to Sing (In Perfect Harmony)". A second jingle recorded for Coca-Cola was "Country Sunshine" by country artist Dottie West.

Known for her characteristic "plaintive" vocal delivery, Dottie West had risen to fame in the 1960s with songs like "Would You Hold It Against Me", "Paper Mansions" and "Here Comes My Baby". The latter brought West the first Grammy award ever given to a female country artist. One of West's commercially-successful singles was 1968's "Country Girl", which was heard by Coca-Cola executives. In 1970, the company offered West a contract to write a jingle adapted from the song. The commercial was a success and in response, Coke offered West a lifetime contract to write jingles for their company. West had reportedly composed 15 Coke commercial jingles by 1979. Among the first jingles she wrote was 1972's "Country Sunshine".

== Content and recording ==
West composed "Country Sunshine" with Coca-Cola songwriter Billy Davis. Dianne Whiles was later added to the song. Whiles claimed that while attending the Mississippi Valley Fair she became friendly with West. Whiles was a contestant in a singing competition for which West was a judge. According to Whiles, she was subsequently invited to any Quad Cities area performance by West. During a post-performance visit to West's tour bus, Whiles played West some self-penned songs. Her writing impressed West enough that she arranged for Whiles to cut demos of these songs which included "Country Sunshine." Whiles states that she heard nothing more on the matter of her demoed songs until seeing one of the televised Coca-Cola ads with West singing "Country Sunshine" in 1973. Whiles, who in 1973 was a single mother of four, has stated that she sued and, after extended litigation, received a credit for co-writing the song plus a financial settlement which she is forbidden to discuss.

The commercial first aired on television through the McCann Ericson advertising company in 1973. The television recording included lyrics that read "I'm happy with the simple things. A Saturday night and a bottle of coke". The featured a woman leaving her farm house in a taxi cab, while her family watches her leave. According to West herself, the commercial had become so popular it prompted her to record the song as a single. The single version of "Country Sunshine" was cut at the RCA Victor Studios on July 30, 1973. The session was also produced by Billy Davis.

== Release and chart performance ==
"Country Sunshine" was released as a single by the RCA Victor label on September 15, 1973. It was distributed as a seven-inch vinyl single. It included a B-side called "Wish I Didn't Love You Anymore". The song also debuted on the US Billboard Hot Country Songs chart on September 15, 1973. It spent a total of 15 weeks there, reaching the number two position on November 17. "Country Sunshine" became West's first single to make the country top ten since 1970's "There's a Story (Goin' 'Round)". The song became West's highest-charting solo single up to that point in her career. It entered the US Billboard Hot 100 on September 29, 1973. It spent a total of 11 weeks on the chart, peaking at the number 49 position. The single became West's second to make the Hot 100. "Country Sunshine" was also West's first to make the Billboard adult contemporary chart. Entering the chart on October 15, it spent a total of five weeks, reaching number 37 by November 3. "Country Sunshine" made similar positions on the RPM charts in Canada, reaching number nine on their Country Tracks survey, number 68 on their Top Singles survey and number 42 on its adult contemporary survey. In November 1973, the single was included on West's studio album of the same name.

== Legacy ==
"Country Sunshine" has since been considered West's signature song. West was later given a Clio advertising award, which was the first even given to a country performer. Following its release, the song as adapted for the 1974 campaign of Tennessee governor candidate Ray Blanton. The song has since been considered one of many country singles that paid homage to country heritage and rejected cosmopolitan lifestyles. Amanda Marie Martinez noted that along with Merle Haggard's "Big City", the song portrayed rural living as "idyllic". Writer and historian Don Cusic found "Country Sunshine" to be a song showcasing "country artists exerting [ed] pride in themselves as country people and in country music."

== Track listing ==
7" vinyl single

- "Country Sunshine" – 2:01
- "Wish I Didn't Love You Anymore" – 2:01

== Charts ==
=== Weekly charts ===
Weekly chart performance for "Country Sunshine"
Chart (1973)	Peak position
Canada Adult Contemporary (RPM)	42
Canada Country Tracks (RPM)	9
Canada Top Singles (RPM)	68
US Adult Contemporary (Billboard)	37
US Billboard Hot 100	49
US Hot Country Songs (Billboard)	2

=== Year-end charts ===
Year-end chart performance for "Country Sunshine"
Chart (1973)	Position
US Hot Country Songs (Billboard)	34

== Accolades ==
Year	Nominee / work	Award	Result	Ref.
1974	Clio Awards	Advertising Excellence for "Country Sunshine" (with Billy Davis)	Won	
1974	16th Annual Grammy Awards	Best Country Song	Nominated	
1974	16th Annual Grammy Awards	Best Country Vocal Performance, Female	Nominated	
