= Billy Davis (songwriter) =

American songwriter and record producer (1932–2004)

- Also known as: Tyran Carlo
- Born: Roquel Davis; July 11, 1932
- Origin: Detroit, Michigan, U.S.
- Died: September 2, 2004 (aged 72) New Rochelle, New York
- Occupations: Songwriter, record producer, singer
- Years active: 1950s–1970s
- Labels: Anna, Chess

Roquel "Billy" Davis (July 11, 1932 – September 2, 2004), of Detroit, was an American songwriter, record producer, and singer. Davis was also known as a writer and producer of commercial jingles, mostly for Coca-Cola. He used the pseudonym Tyran Carlo on writing credits.

Early in his career in Detroit, Davis sang and wrote with an early version of the Four Tops called "The Four Aims", which included his cousin Lawrence Payton. In the late-1950s, he collaborated with Berry Gordy, the Motown Records founder, to write a number of hit songs for Jackie Wilson. The most notable of these was "Lonely Teardrops", written by Davis, Gordy, and Gordy's sister Gwen, who was Davis's girlfriend at the time. Davis and Gwen Gordy later founded Anna Records, which was the distributor of the early singles from Berry Gordy's newly formed Tamla label. The two also wrote "Reet Petite (The Finest Girl You Ever Want to Meet)" for Wilson, which was a top 10 hit for the singer in the UK and later topped the British charts in 1986 when re-released. Another success for the two was Marv Johnson's major hit in 1959, "You Got What It Takes" (#2 R&B, No. 10 Pop), as the two continued to work together.

In the early 1960s, Davis left Detroit and moved to Chess Records in Chicago, after being persuaded by label owner, Leonard Chess to take charge of the A&R and creative departments, bringing in and supervising in-house songwriters, arrangers and producers, who were aiming now at the soul and crossover pop markets. During this period, he wrote and produced for many artists, including Etta James, The Dells, Billy Stewart, Little Milton, Jackie Ross, Mitty Collier, Fontella Bass, Chuck Berry, and Jackie Wilson.

Davis quit Chess towards the end of 1968, some months before the record company was eventually sold, with his success at the label gaining him a position writing and producing jingles at the McCann Erickson advertising agency in New York City. He eventually rose to Senior Vice-President and Music Director. While at McCann-Erickson, Davis's primary client was The Coca-Cola Company, for which he produced the famous jingle "I'd Like to Teach the World to Sing (In Perfect Harmony)", used in a 1971 Coca-Cola television advertisement. He also produced other jingles such as "It's the Real Thing", "Things Go Better with Coke" and "Country Sunshine" for Coca-Cola (with country singer Dottie West, who recorded the song), and "If You've Got the Time" for Miller Beer.

The Coca-Cola advertisement Hey Kid, Catch!, starring Mean Joe Greene, included the song "Have a Coke and Smile" produced by Davis. Hey Kid, Catch! won the Clio and Cannes Gold Lion awards. It is also seen as one of the greatest Super Bowl ads of all time.

Davis introduced both Aretha Franklin and Ray Charles to singing songs for advertising, and both artists sang songs produced by Davis for Coca-Cola commercials. In 2007, Davis was inducted into the Advertising Hall of Fame.

Davis died of natural causes in New Rochelle, New York, in September 2004. He was 72 years old.
