= John Conlee discography =

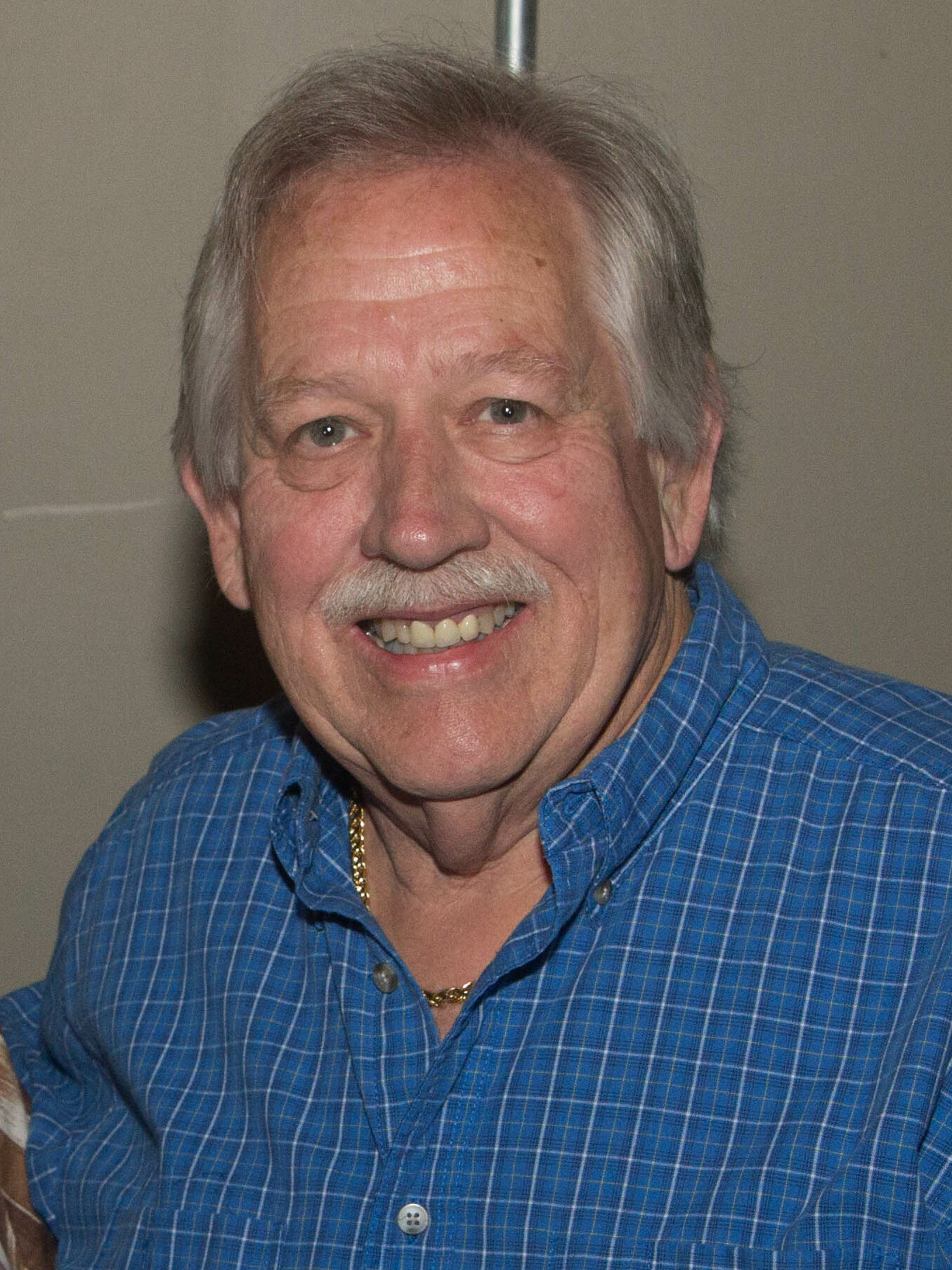
- Conlee in 2017.
- Studio albums: 12
- Compilation albums: 9
- Singles: 35
- Music videos: 4

American country music singer John Conlee has released twelve studio albums and thirty-five singles.

Conlee made his charted debut in 1978 with "Rose Colored Glasses", which went to number five on the Billboard Hot Country Songs charts. Conlee charted 32 times on Hot Country Songs, reaching number one with "Lady Lay Down", "Backside of Thirty", "Common Man", "I'm Only in It for the Love", "In My Eyes", "As Long as I'm Rockin' with You", and "Got My Heart Set on You".

Conlee's debut album Rose Colored Glasses was released through ABC Records. After that label was acquired by MCA Records, he recorded for MCA until 1986, when he transferred to Columbia Records. He moved again to the former 16th Avenue Records in 1989, and the independent RCR label in 2000.

== Studio albums ==
Year	Album	Chart Positions		Label
Year	Album	US Country	CAN Country	Label
1978	Rose Colored Glasses	11	3	ABC
1979	Forever	20	—	MCA
1980	Friday Night Blues	16	11	MCA
1981	With Love	22	—	MCA
1982	Busted	21	—	MCA
1983	In My Eyes	9	—	MCA
1984	Blue Highway	14	—	MCA
1986	Harmony	9	—	Columbia
1987	American Faces	16	—	Columbia
1989	Fellow Travelers	60	—	16th Avenue
2004	Turn Your Eyes Upon Jesus	—	—	RCR

== Compilation albums ==
Year	Album	Chart Positions		Certifications		Label
Year	Album	US Country	US	US	CAN	Label
1983	Greatest Hits	17	166	Gold	Gold	MCA
1985	Greatest Hits Volume 2	33	—	—	—	MCA
1986	Songs for the Working Man	—	—	—	—	MCA
1986	Conlee Country	—	—	—	—	MCA
1987	20 Greatest Hits	—	—	—	—	MCA
1999	Live at Billy Bob's Texas	—	—	—	—	Smith Music
2000	Classics	—	—	—	—	RCR
2015	Classics 2	—	—	—	—	RCR
2018	Classics 3	—	—	—	—	RCR

== Singles ==
Year	Single	Peak positions		Album
Year	Single	US Country	CAN Country	Album
1977	"The In Crowd"	—	—	Forever
1978	"Rose Colored Glasses"	5	6	Rose Colored Glasses
1978	"Lady Lay Down"	1	2	Rose Colored Glasses
1979	"Backside of Thirty"	1	5	Rose Colored Glasses
1979	"Before My Time"	2	1	Forever
1980	"Baby, You're Something"	7	7	Forever
1980	"Friday Night Blues"	2	3	Friday Night Blues
1980	"She Can't Say That Anymore"	2	11	Friday Night Blues
1981	"What I Had with You"	12	15	Friday Night Blues
1981	"Could You Love Me (One More Time)"	26	37	With Love
1981	"Miss Emily's Picture"	2	7	With Love
1982	"Busted"	6	5	Busted
1982	"Nothing Behind You, Nothing in Sight"	26	36	Busted
1982	"I Don't Remember Loving You"	10	3	Busted
1983	"Common Man"	1	1	Busted
1983	"I'm Only in It for the Love"	1	2	In My Eyes
1983	"In My Eyes"	1	2	In My Eyes
1984	"As Long as I'm Rockin' with You"	1	1	In My Eyes
1984	"Way Back"	4	2	In My Eyes
1984	"Years After You"	2	2	Blue Highway
1985	"Working Man"	7	6	Blue Highway
1985	"Blue Highway"	15	13	Blue Highway
1985	"Old School"	5	6	Greatest Hits Volume 2
1986	"Harmony"	10	19	Harmony
1986	"Got My Heart Set on You"	1	1	Harmony
1986	"The Carpenter"	6	1	Harmony
1987	"Domestic Life"	4	5	American Faces
1987	"Mama's Rockin' Chair"	11	7	American Faces
1987	"Living Like There's No Tomorrow"	55	—	American Faces
1988	"Hit the Ground Runnin'"	43	—	Fellow Travelers
1989	"Fellow Travelers"	48	54	Fellow Travelers
1989	"Hopelessly Yours"	67	—	Fellow Travelers
1990	"Don't Get Me Started"	—	—	Fellow Travelers
1990	"Doghouse"	61	—	—N/a
2002	"She's Mine"	—	—	Classics
"—" denotes releases that did not chart

== Music videos ==
Year	Video
1989	"Fellow Travelers"
1989	"Hopelessly Yours"
1990	"Doghouse"
2006	"They Also Serve"
