= The Kendalls discography =

Discography for the country duo The Kendalls

- Studio albums: 14
- Compilation albums: 4
- Singles: 46
- Music videos: 4

The Kendalls was an American country music duo composed of Royce Kendall and his daughter Jeannie Kendall. Their discography consists of 14 studio albums, four compilation albums, 46 singles, and four music videos. Of their singles, 38 charted on the U.S. Billboard Hot Country Songs charts between 1970 and 1989, including the number one singles "Heaven's Just a Sin Away" (1977), "Sweet Desire" / "Old Fashioned Love" (1978), and "Thank God for the Radio" (1984).

== Albums ==
=== Studio albums ===
Title	Album details	Peak positions		Certifications
Title	Album details	US Country	CAN Country	Certifications
Meet the Kendalls	Release year: 1970; Label: Stop	—	—	
Two Divided by Love	Release year: 1972; Label: Dot	—	—	
Heaven's Just a Sin Away	Release year: 1977; Label: Ovation	5	—	US: Gold; CAN: Platinum
Old Fashioned Love	Release year: 1978; Label: Ovation	16	6	
Just Like Real People	Release year: 1979; Label: Ovation	12	1	
Heart of the Matter	Release year: 1979; Label: Ovation	24	—	
Lettin' You in on a Feelin'	Release year: 1981; Label: Mercury	42	—	
Stickin' Together	Release year: 1982; Label: Mercury	38	—	
Movin' Train	Release year: 1983; Label: Mercury	16	—	
Two Heart Harmony	Release year: 1984; Label: Mercury	27	—	
Fire at First Sight	Release year: 1986; Label: Curb / MCA	47	—	
Break the Routine	Release year: 1987; Label: Step One	51	—	
20 Favorites	Release year: 1989; Label: Epic	—	—	
Make a Dance	Release year: 1995; Label: Lonesome Dove	—	—	
"—" denotes releases that did not chart

=== Compilation albums ===
Title	Album details	Peak positions
Title	Album details	US Country
Best Country Duo - 1978 Grammy Award Winners	Release year: 1978; Label: Gusto	—
The Best of the Kendalls	Release year: 1980; Label: Ovation	34
Thank God for the Radio... and All the Hits	Release year: 1985; Label: Mercury	59
The Best of the Kendalls	Release year: 1994; Label: Curb	—
16 Greatest Hits	Release year: 1999; Label: Varèse Sarabande	—
"—" denotes releases that did not chart

== Singles ==
=== 1970s ===
Year	Single	Peak positions					Album
Year	Single	US Country	US	CAN Country	CAN	CAN AC	Album
1970	"Leaving on a Jet Plane"	52	—	—	—	—	Meet the Kendalls
1970	"You've Lost That Lovin' Feelin'"	—	—	—	—	—	Meet the Kendalls
1971	"Love, Love Love"	—	—	—	—	—	Non-album single
1972	"Two Divided by Love"	53	—	—	—	—	Two Divided by Love
1972	"Everything I Own"	66	—	—	—	—	Two Divided by Love
1973	"You and Me"	—	—	—	—	—	Non-album singles
1973	"I Wanna Live Here in Your Love"	—	—	—	—	—	Non-album singles
1975	"Love Do or Die"	—	—	—	—	—	Non-album singles
1975	"Diesel Gypsy"	—	—	—	—	—	Non-album singles
1976	"Imaginary Harmony"	—	—	—	—	—	Non-album singles
1977	"Making Believe"	80	—	—	—	—	Heaven's Just a Sin Away
1977	"Heaven's Just a Sin Away"	1	69	1	59	37	Heaven's Just a Sin Away
1978	"It Don't Feel Like Sinnin' to Me"	2	—	2	—	—	Old Fashioned Love
1978	"Pittsburgh Stealers"	6	—	28	—	—	Old Fashioned Love
1978	"Sweet Desire"	1 (Note: "Sweet Desire" and "Old Fashioned Love" charted as a double A-side on Hot Country Songs.)	—	2	—	—	Old Fashioned Love
1978	"Old Fashioned Love"	1	—	—	—	—	Old Fashioned Love
1979	"I Had a Lovely Time"	5	—	4	—	—	Just Like Real People
1979	"Just Like Real People"	11	—	4	—	—	Just Like Real People
1979	"I Don't Do Like That No More"	16 (Note: "I Don't Do Like That No More" and "Never My Love" charted as a double A-side on Hot Country Songs.)	—	33	—	—	Heart of the Matter
1979	"Never My Love"	16	—	—	—	—	Just Like Real People
1979	"You'd Make an Angel Wanna Cheat"	5	—	17	—	—	Heart of the Matter
"—" denotes releases that did not chart

=== 1980s and 1990s ===
Year	Single	Peak positions		Album
Year	Single	US Country	CAN Country	Album
1980	"I'm Already Blue"	5	25	Heart of the Matter
1980	"Put It Off Until Tomorrow"	9	5	Heart of the Matter
1981	"Heart of the Matter"	26	31	Heart of the Matter
1981	"Teach Me to Cheat"	7	42	Lettin' You in on a Feelin'
1981	"If You're Waiting on Me (You're Backing Up)"	10	—	Lettin' You in on a Feelin'
1982	"Cheater's Prayer"	30	—	Stickin' Together
1982	"That's What I Get for Thinking"	35	—	Stickin' Together
1983	"Precious Love"	19	—	Movin' Train
1983	"Movin' Train"	20	—	Movin' Train
1984	"Thank God for the Radio"	1	16	Movin' Train
1984	"My Baby's Gone"	15	35	Movin' Train
1984	"I'd Dance Every Dance with You"	20	—	Movin' Train
1985	"Four Wheel Drive"	27	—	Two Heart Harmony
1985	"If You Break My Heart"	26	30	Two Heart Harmony
1985	"Two Heart Harmony"	45	—	Two Heart Harmony
1986	"Too Late"	42	31	Fire at First Sight
1986	"Fire at First Sight"	60	—	Fire at First Sight
1986	"Little Doll"	46	53	Fire at First Sight
1987	"Routine"	54	—	Break the Routine
1987	"Dancin' with Myself Tonight"	51	—	Break the Routine
1987	"Still Pickin' Up After You"	62	—	Break the Routine
1988	"The Rhythm of Romance"	57	—	Break the Routine
1989	"Blue Blue Day"	69	—	20 Favorites
1995	"Make a Dance"	—	—	Make a Dance
"—" denotes releases that did not chart

=== As featured artist ===
Year	Single	Peak positions	Album
Year	Single	US Country	Album
1985	"One Big Family" (as part of Heart of Nashville)	61	Non-album single

== Music videos ==
Year	Video	Director
1983	"Movin' Train"	Marc Ball
1985	"One Big Family" (as part of Heart of Nashville)	Steve Von Hagel
1985	"If You Break My Heart"	Bayron Binkley
1995	"Make a Dance"	Michael Killen
