= Sheila Andrews =

American country singer (1953–1984)

- Sheila Andrews on the cover of her album Lovesick

Background information
- Born: Sheila Marlene Andrews; April 10, 1953; Athens, Alabama, U.S.
- Died: December 26, 1984 (aged 31) Akron, Ohio, U.S.
- Genres: Country
- Occupation: Singer
- Years active: 1970s–1984
- Labels: Ovation, Brylen

Sheila Marlene Andrews (April 10, 1953 – December 26, 1984) was an American country music singer. Signed to the Ovation label, she recorded three studio albums in her career and released several singles on the Billboard Hot Country Songs including "It Don't Get Better Than This", her highest charting single.

== Biography ==
Sheila Marlene Alldredge was born in Athens, Alabama, in 1953 to James and Willie Alldredge. She had two brothers named Frank and Michael. Andrews' father traveled to Ohio from Alabama to work in rubber plants and was a truck driver when he worked in Alabama. Eventually the family moved to Akron, Ohio, permanently. When Andrews was 16 she got married. The couple had four children and later divorced.

While living in Ohio, Andrews got a job selling carpeting over the phone for CarpetTown. She began singing in a nightclub when she was 23. Her second husband "discovered" her and urged her to move to Nashville and meet producer Brien Fisher of Ovation Records and begin a recording career.

== Career ==
Andrews sang in a soulful type voice; she told the Milwaukee Journal after moving to Nashville, "When I first came down here from Akron and met different people who listened to my tape they all said, 'You sound so different'. Later on they said it was good, but at the time it made me feel really bad". One of the reasons for Andrews' unique voice was a result of surgery that removed a tumor from her thyroid. Andrews revealed that after the surgery, "They didn't tell me I wasn't supposed to sing or talk loud for a year. I started singing after the operation and it lowered on me. It used to be three or four octaves higher. Now when I talk everyone thinks I have a cold."

Andrews also said during another interview, that after the surgery, "I started singing in a nightclub shortly after the operation and that's when my voice began to lower and lower on me. I should have been furious with that careless doctor but how can I when he is a lot responsible for the upturn of my career!"

=== 1978 Love Me Like a Woman ===
In 1978, Andrews signed with the Ovation Records label. The same year Andrews released her debut album, Love Me Like a Woman, under Fisher's production. The album's first single was the Layng Martine, Jr. penned "Too Fast for Rapid City" which reached No. 88 on the Billboard Hot Country Singles & Tracks chart. Its follow-up and title track "Love Me like a Woman" failed to chart. The album's third and final single "I Gotta Get Back the Feeling" also peaked at No. 88.

In a review printed in The Ottawa Citizen, the author gave the album a mixed review by writing, "Andrews demonstrates a lot of potential on this album, but she has to quit being so self-conscious of her husky, wispy, voice and allow it to express more natural feelings."

=== 1979–1981: What I Had With You and Lovesick ===
Between Andrews' first two albums, Ovation released "What I Had With You" as a single with fellow label mate Joe Sun. "What I Had With You" was more successful on the Billboard charts than her first three singles, reaching a peak of No. 48 on the Country Singles chart. The song would later go on to be a top twenty hit when John Conlee recorded the song two years later.

In 1979, Ovation released a sampler LP album featuring artists on the label including Andrews.

The same year, Andrews signed with Jim Halsey's Thunderbird Artists booking agency. Later in the year Andrews appeared on the German TV series Rock Pop and performed "Diggin' and a Grindin' for His Love" which she had recorded on her debut album. Andrews also appeared on Pop! Goes the Country during the 1980–1981 season. She sang "A Little Thing Like Love" and also sang a medley of "Blueberry Hill" and "Blue Suede Shoes" with host Tom T. Hall.

On September 22, 1980, Andrews released her second album, Lovesick. Billboard gave the album a positive review and wrote, "Snappy production enhances the glittering array of love ballads." The album's first single "It Don't Get Better Than This" would go on to be the highest charting single of her career when it reached a peak of 42. Billboard listed "It Don't Get Better Than This" as a Top Single Pick. The album's second single, "Where Could You Take Me," debuted at number 80 in the November 29th issue of Billboard, but would only peak at number 58.

In May 1981 Andrews appeared on That Nashville Music which also featured Vern Gosdin who had just joined Ovation Records.

Andrews' final single, "Maybe I Should Have Been Listening", failed to chart, but would later become a top forty hit for Gene Watson. In 1981 Ovation went out of business leaving Andrews without a recording contract.

=== 1982: Crystal Tears ===
In 1982, Andrews signed with the small label Brylen where she made one album, Crystal Tears, but no singles were released from it.

== Personal life ==
In November 1981, Andrews' furnace blew up at her house, which injured her. The explosion burned her eyelashes, eyebrows and hair. Following the accident Andrews said "I look like a lobster".

Andrews died from a heart attack on December 26, 1984, in Akron, Ohio, at the age of 31.

== Discography ==
=== Studio albums ===
Title	Details
Love Me Like A Woman	Release date: October 10, 1979; Label: Ovation
Lovesick	Release date: September 22, 1980; Label: Ovation
Crystal Tears	Release date: 1982; Label: Brylen

=== Singles ===
Year	Single	Chart Positions	Album
Year	Single	US Country	Album
1978	"Too Fast For Rapid City"	88	Love Me Like A Woman
1979	"Love Me Like a Woman"	—	Love Me Like A Woman
1979	"I Gotta Get Back The Feeling"	88	Love Me Like A Woman
1979	"What I Had With You" (with Joe Sun)	48	single only
1980	"It Don't Get Better Than This"	42	Lovesick
1980	"Where Could You Take Me"	58	Lovesick
1981	"Maybe I Should Have Been Listening"	—	Lovesick
