= Country Boy & Country Girl =

Studio album by Jimmy Dean and Dottie West
- Released: November 1970
- Recorded: September 1970
- Studio: RCA Studio B
- Genre: Country; Nashville Sound
- Label: RCA Victor
- Producer: Jerry Bradley

Jimmy Dean chronology
The Dean of Country Music (1970)	Country Boy & Country Girl (1970)	Everybody Knows (1971)

Dottie West chronology
Forever Yours (1970)	Country Boy & Country Girl (1970)	Careless Hands (1971)

Singles from Country Boy & Country Girl
- 1. "Slowly" Released: January 1971

Country Boy & Country Girl is a studio album by American country music artists Jimmy Dean and Dottie West. It was released in November 1970 on RCA Victor Records and was produced by Jerry Bradley. The project was a collection duet recordings between both artists. It was Dean's first collaborative album and West's second. The album spawned one single entitled "Slowly", which would be released in 1971. Country Boy & Country Girl would also reach peak positions on national music publication charts following its release.

== Background and content ==
Jimmy Dean had wanted to record an album of duets with Dottie West several years prior to the release of Country Boy & Girl. However, scheduling conflicts required them to postpone the project until they could make arrangements. The album was produced by Jerry Bradley at RCA Studio B in September 1970. The record consisted of ten tracks, all of which were duet recordings. All of the album's tracks were previously recorded by other artists. Most of the songs were covers of duet recordings made hits by country music duo's. Among these tracks was "Wish I Didn't Have to Miss You", which was originally a hit for Jack Greene and Jeannie Seely. A second featured track is "Jackson", which was first a hit for Johnny Cash and June Carter. A third example is "Let It Be Me", which had recently been a duet hit for Glen Campbell and Bobbie Gentry.

== Release and reception ==
Country Boy & Country Girl was released in November 1970 on RCA Victor Records. The album was issued as a vinyl LP, containing five songs on each side of the record. The album peaked at number 42 on the Billboard Top Country Albums chart following its release. The album only spawned one single, "Slowly". Released in January 1971, the single became a top 40 hit on the Billboard Hot Country Singles chart, reaching number 29 that year. Following its release, Country Boy & Country Girl was reviewed by Billboard in their November 1970 issue. Writers praised duet partnership, calling it powerful. They also highlighted several tracks that they believed were standout songs, including the single. "This is very powerful country merchandise, coupling two artists of name power in a series of great country duets," reviewers commented.

== Track listing ==
Side one
No.	Title	Writer(s)	Original Artist(s)	Length
1.	"Slowly"	Tommy Hill; Webb Pierce	Webb Pierce	1:59
2.	"Jackson"	Billy Ed Wheeler; Jerry Leiber (as Gaby Rogers)	Johnny Cash and June Carter	2:47
3.	"For the Good Times"	Kris Kristofferson	Ray Price	3:38
4.	"Let It Be Me"	Mann Curtis; Pierre Delanoë; Gilbert Bécaud	The Everly Brothers	2:02
5.	"Yours Love"	Harlan Howard	Dolly Parton and Porter Wagoner	2:21

Side two
No.	Title	Writer(s)	Original Artist(s)	Length
1.	"Sweet Thang"	Nat Stuckey	Nat Stuckey	2:37
2.	"Put It Off Until Tomorrow"	Bill Owens; Dolly Parton	Bill Phillips	2:20
3.	"I Got You"	Gordon Galbraith; Ricci Mareno	Anita Carter and Waylon Jennings	2:28
4.	"Just Someone I Used to Know"	Jack Clement	Dolly Parton and Porter Wagoner	2:06
5.	"Wish I Didn't Have to Miss You"	Hank Cochran; Dave Kirby	Jack Greene and Jeannie Seely	1:52

== Personnel ==
All credits are adapted from the liner notes of Country Boy & Country Girl.

Musical personnel

- Harold Bradley – bass
- David Briggs – piano
- Jimmy Dean – vocals
- Pete Drake – pedal steel guitar
- Ray Edenton – guitar
- Buddy Harman – drums
- The Jordanaires – background vocals
- Grady Martin – guitar
- Charlie McCoy – harmonica, vibes
- Bob Moore – bass
- Bill West – pedal steel guitar
- Dottie West – vocals
- Morris Wix – guitar

Technical personnel

- Jerry Bradley – producer
- Les Ladd – recording engineer
- Roy Shockley – recording technician

== Chart performance ==
Chart (1970)	Peak position
US Top Country Albums (Billboard)	42

== Release history ==
Region	Date	Format	Label	Ref.
North America	November 1970	Vinyl	RCA Victor	
