= Dottie Sings Eddy =

Studio album by Dottie West
- Released: May 1969
- Recorded: March 1969
- Studio: RCA Studio B (Nashville, Tennessee)
- Genre: Country; Nashville Sound
- Length: 27:43
- Label: RCA Victor
- Producer: Chet Atkins; Danny Davis

Dottie West chronology
Dottie and Don (1969)	Dottie Sings Eddy (1969)	Makin' Memories (1969)

Dottie Sings Eddy is a studio album by American country music artist Dottie West. It was released in March 1969 on RCA Victor Records. The album was co-produced by Chet Atkins and Danny Davis. The project was a tribute to country artist, Eddy Arnold, whom West considered an inspiration in her career. West covered 11 tracks that were originally recorded by Arnold throughout his career.

== Background and content ==
Dottie Sings Eddy was recorded as a tribute album to country artist Eddy Arnold. West considered Arnold to be an inspiration her own career. The album was co-produced by Chet Atkins and Danny Davis. The liner notes of the original album were also composed by Davis. In the liner notes, Davis called the project "a real winner" and said that the recording sessions were "very successful". The sessions took place in March 1969 at RCA Studio B in Nashville, Tennessee. The album was a collection of 11 tracks, all of which were previously recorded and made hits by Arnold. West covered songs from different eras of Arnold's career. Among the early recordings covered is "Cattle Call" (1955) and "I'll Hold You in My Heart (Till I Can Hold You in My Arms)" (1947). West also covered tunes Arnold later cut in the Nashville Sound style. Songs of this nature included "Make the World Go Away" (1965), "The Last Word in Lonesome Is Me" (1966) and "They Don't Make Them Like They Used To" (1968).

== Release ==
Dottie Sings Eddy was originally released in May 1969 on RCA Victor Records, becoming West's twelfth studio recording issued. The album was first issued as a vinyl LP, featuring six songs on "side one" and five songs on "side two". In 2019, the album was reissued to digital retailers for streaming purposes by Sony Music Entertainment. The album's release was first announced in a July 1969 issue of Billboard Magazine, which was posted in alphabetical order under the magazine's "New Album Releases" page. The project did not spawn any known singles, becoming West's fourth studio record to do so.

== Track listing ==
=== Original vinyl version ===
Side one
No.	Title	Writer(s)	Length
1.	"Anytime"	Herbert "Happy" Lawson	2:25
2.	"I Love You So Much It Hurts"	Floyd Tillman	1:54
3.	"Make the World Go Away"	Hank Cochran	2:06
4.	"I'll Hold You in My Heart (Till I Can Hold You in My Arms)"	Eddy Arnold; Tim Dilbreck; Hal Horton	2:37
5.	"I Really Don't Want to Know"	Howard Barnes; Don Robertson	2:37
6.	"The Last Word in Lonesome Is Me"	Roger Miller	2:20

Side two
No.	Title	Writer(s)	Length
1.	"It's a Sin"	Fred Rose; Zeb Turner	2:42
2.	"You Don't Know Me"	Arnold; Cindy Walker	2:39
3.	"It Makes No Difference Now"	Jimmie Davis; Tillman	3:09
4.	"Cattle Call"	Tex Owens	3:00
5.	"They Don't Make Love Like They Used To"	Red Lane	2:58

=== Digital version ===
Dottie Sings Eddy (2018)
No.	Title	Writer(s)	Length
1.	"Anytime"	Herbert "Happy" Lawson	2:25
2.	"I Love You So Much It Hurts"	Tillman	1:54
3.	"Make the World Go Away"	Cochran	2:06
4.	"I'll Hold You in My Heart (Till I Can Hold You in My Arms)"	Arnold; Dilbreck; Horton	2:37
5.	"I Really Don't Want to Know"	Howard Barnes; Robertson	2:37
6.	"The Last Word in Lonesome Is Me"	Miller	2:20
7.	"It's a Sin"	Rose; Turner	2:42
8.	"You Don't Know Me"	Arnold; Walker	2:39
9.	"It Makes No Difference Now"	Davis; Tillman	3:09
10.	"Cattle Call"	Owens	3:00
11.	"They Don't Make Love Like They Used To"	Lane	2:58

== Personnel ==
All credits are adapted from the liner notes of Dottie Sings Eddy.

Musical personnel

- Harold Bradley – guitar
- Buddy Harman – drums
- Grady Martin – guitar
- Bob Moore – bass
- Ferrell Morris – vibes
- The Nashville Edition – background vocals
- Jerry Reed – guitar
- Hargus "Pig" Robbins – piano
- Bill West – steel guitar
- Dottie West – lead vocals

Technical personnel

- Chet Atkins – producer
- Danny Davis – producer
- Roy Shockley – engineering
- Don Tweedy – arrangement, conductor

== Release history ==
Region	Date	Format	Label	Ref.
North America	May 1969	Vinyl	RCA Victor	
North America	March 29, 2019	Music download	Sony Music Entertainment	
