= Common Man =

1981 song by Sammy Johns and 1983 single by John Conlee

Single by John Conlee

from the album Busted
- B-side: "Rose Colored Glasses"
- Released: February 1983
- Genre: Country
- Length: 2:42
- Label: MCA
- Songwriter(s): Sammy Johns
- Producer(s): Bud Logan

John Conlee singles chronology
"I Don't Remember Loving You" (1982)	"Common Man" (1983)	"I'm Only in It for the Love" (1983)

"Common Man" is a song written by Sammy Johns and originally recorded by him in 1981 via Elektra Records. Johns's version charted at number 50 on Hot Country Songs in 1981. It had "Easy to Be with You" on the B-side, and was produced by James Stroud and Tom Long.

It was later recorded by American country music artist John Conlee. It was released in February 1983 as the fourth single from his album Busted. The song was Conlee's third number one on the country chart, and his first number one since 'Backside of Thirty" in 1979. The single stayed at number one for one week.

== Chart performance ==
=== Sammy Johns ===
Chart (1981)	Peak position
US Hot Country Songs (Billboard)	50

=== John Conlee ===
Chart (1983)	Peak position
US Hot Country Songs (Billboard)	1
Canadian RPM Country Tracks	1

=== Year-end charts ===
Chart (1983)	Position
US Hot Country Songs (Billboard)	17
