= Blue Highway (disambiguation) =

Blue Highway may refer to:

- Blue Highway, an American contemporary bluegrass band
- Blue Highway (tourist route), an international tourist route from Norway to Russia via Sweden and Finland
- "Blue Highway" (song), a song by John Conlee
- "Blue Highway", a song by Tony Carey from his 1985 album also named Blue Highway
- "Blue Highway", a song by Heatmiser from their 1996 album Mic City Sons
- "Blue Highway", a song by Billy Idol from his 1983 album Rebel Yell
- "Blue Highway", a song by George Thorogood from his 1982 album Bad to the Bone
- Blue Highways, a book by William Least Heat-Moon
- Blue Ridge Parkway, sometimes called the Blue Highway, a National Parkway and All-American Road in the United States
