= Country and West =

Studio album by Dottie West
- Released: May 1970
- Recorded: February 1970
- Studio: RCA Studio B (Nashville, Tennessee)
- Genre: Country; Nashville Sound
- Length: 32:00
- Label: RCA Victor
- Producer: Danny Davis

Dottie West chronology
Makin' Memories (1969)	Country and West (1970)	Forever Yours (1970)

Singles from Country and West
- 1. "It's Dawned on Me You're Gone" Released: July 1970

Country and West is a studio album by American country music artist Dottie West. It was released in May 1970 on RCA Victor Records and was produced by Danny Davis. Her fourteenth studio album, Country and West spawned one single that became a minor hit on the national publication charts in 1970. It was also one of three studio albums West would release in 1970.

== Background and content ==
Country and West was recorded at RCA Studio B in February 1970. The sessions were produced by Danny Davis and was West's second studio album to be fully produced by him. Davis had also written the liner notes for the project. "Being her producer for recordings I am probably more critical of what she sings than any of her listeners, and to me she is 'something wonderful'," he commented. The album was a collection of 11 tracks. Some of the songs were recordings while others were cover versions. Country and West included cover versions of Merle Haggard's "Today I Started Loving You Again", Tammy Wynette's "I Stayed Long Enough", Dolly Parton's "As Long as I Love You" and Ernest Tubb's "Tomorrow Never Comes". It was one of West's few RCA studio releases to not include a self-penned track. West's songwriting collaborator, Red Lane, did contribute to composing the single "It's Dawned on Me You're Gone".

== Release and reception ==
Country and West was released in May 1970 on RCA Victor Records, becoming her fourteenth studio recording. It was issued on a vinyl LP, featuring six songs on "side one" and five songs on "side two" of the record. The album did not reach any peak positions on the Billboard charts following its release. However, it did spawn one single. Spending ten weeks on the Billboard Hot Country Singles chart, "It's Dawned on Me You're Gone" would peak at number 37 in September 1970. Following its release, the project was reviewed favorably by Billboard magazine. In their June 1970 issue, writers called the album "a powerful package", praising West's vocals and Davis' production. "The vocalist has a style which radiates individuality and warmth and she is excellently produced by Danny Davis," writers commented.

== Track listing ==
Side one
No.	Title	Writer(s)	Length
1.	"It's Dawned on Me You're Gone"	Hank Cochran; Red Lane	2:50
2.	"As Long as I Love You"	Dolly Parton	3:07
3.	"Love's Farewell"	Wayne White	2:29
4.	"I'm Only Human"	Alex Zanetis	3:50
5.	"Today I Started Loving You Again"	Merle Haggard	3:00
6.	"Left Over Feelings"	William C. Rainsford	2:38

Side two
No.	Title	Writer(s)	Length
1.	"(I'm So) Afraid of Losing You Again"	Dallas Frazier; A.L. "Doodle" Owens	3:14
2.	"Tomorrow Never Comes"	Johnny Bond; Ernest Tubb	2:40
3.	"You Destroyed Me"	Rainsford	3:06
4.	"I Stayed Long Enough"	Tammy Wynette	2:18
5.	"Loving You (Has Meant Everything to Me)"	Don Gibson	2:56

== Personnel ==
All credits are adapted from the liner notes of Country and West.

Musical personnel

- Larry Butler – piano
- Kenneth Buttrey – drums
- Pete Drake – steel guitar
- Buddy Harman – drums
- Roy Huskey – bass
- The Jordanaires – background vocals
- Millie Kirkham – background vocals
- Grady Martin – guitar
- Norbert Putnam – bass
- Jerry Shook – guitar
- Bobby Thompson – banjo
- Pete Wade – guitar
- Bill West – steel guitar
- Dottie West – lead vocals
- James Wilkerson – guitar

Technical personnel

- Danny Davis – producer
- Tom Pick – engineering
- Al Puchucki – engineering
- Roy Shockley – recording technician
- Tasso Vendikos – photography

== Release history ==
Region	Date	Format	Label	Ref.
United States	May 1970	Vinyl	RCA Victor Records	
United States	circa 2023	Music download; streaming	Sony Music Entertainment	
