= Makin' Memories (album) =

Studio album by Dottie West
- Released: December 1969
- Recorded: September 1969
- Studio: RCA Studio B (Nashville, Tennessee)
- Genre: Country; Nashville Sound
- Label: RCA Victor
- Producer: Danny Davis

Dottie West chronology
Dottie Sings Eddy (1969)	Makin' Memories (1969)	Country and West (1970)

Singles from Makin' Memories
- 1. "Clinging to My Baby's Hand" Released: September 1969; 2. "I Heard Our Song" Released: January 1970; 3. "Long Black Limousine" Released: March 1970

Makin' Memories is a studio album by American country music artist Dottie West. It was released in December 1969 on RCA Victor Records and was produced by Danny Davis. Her thirteenth studio album, Makin' Memories was also her third to be released in 1969. The album included three singles that became minor hits on the national music publication charts.

== Background and content ==
Makin' Memories was produced by Danny Davis in September 1969 at RCA Studio B. It was West's third album collaboration with Davis, who produced her two previous 1969 studio albums. According to the project's liner notes, studio sessions took place as late as one o'clock in the morning. Other artists and producers watched to hear West record during these sessions including Chet Atkins (her former producer) and Waylon Jennings. The album was a collection of 11 tracks. Most of the track were new recordings. Both the title track and "Clinging to My Baby's Hand" were composed by West herself. Also included in the album was a cover of "With Pen in Hand", a song first made a country hit by Johnny Darrell and later a pop hit by Vikki Carr.

== Release and chart performance ==
Makin' Memories was released in December 1969 on RCA Victor Records, becoming her thirteenth studio album issued in her career. The album was originally issued as a vinyl LP, containing six songs on "side one" and five songs on "side two". Although Makin' Memories did not chart on the Billboard Top Country Albums survey, it did produce three singles. The first to be released was "Clinging to My Baby's Hand". Issued in September 1969, the song became a minor hit after it reached number 47 on the Billboard Hot Country Singles chart. In January 1970, "I Heard Our Song" was released as the record's second single and peaked at number 45 on the country songs chart. The third single, "Long Black Limousine" (released in March 1970), did not make a Billboard chart appearance.

== Track listing ==
Side one
No.	Title	Writer(s)	Length
1.	"I Heard Our Song"	Sandy Mason	3:04
2.	"Thank You, Baby"	Martha Sharp	3:11
3.	"Clinging to My Baby's Hand"	Red Lane; Dottie West	2:40
4.	"With Pen in Hand"	Bobby Goldsboro	4:05
5.	"Puttin' Pain on Paper"	Martin Burke	2:12
6.	"Don't Say a Word"	Geoff Stephens; Les Reed	2:10

Side two
No.	Title	Writer(s)	Length
1.	"Makin' Memories"	West	2:53
2.	"You Didn't Stop to Say Hello"	Alex Zanetis	2:38
3.	"You Fool"	Sharp	2:20
4.	"Long Black Limousine"	Bobby George; Vern Stovall	3:57
5.	"Her Hello Was My Goodbye"	Elizabeth McQuinn	2:24

== Personnel ==
All credits are adapted from the liner notes of Makin' Memories.

Musical personnel

- Harold Bradley – guitar
- Ray Edenton – guitar
- Buddy Harman – drums
- Grady Martin – guitar
- Bob Moore – bass
- Ferrell Morris – vibes
- The Nashville Edition – background vocals
- Hargus "Pig" Robbins – piano
- Bill West – steel guitar
- Dottie West – lead vocals

Technical personnel

- Danny Davis – producer

== Release history ==
Region	Date	Format	Label	Ref.
North America	December 1969	Vinyl	RCA Victor Records	
North America	circa 2023	Music download; streaming	Sony Music Entertainment	
