= Forever Yours (Dottie West album) =

Studio album by Dottie West
- Released: October 1970
- Recorded: July 1970
- Studio: RCA Studio B (Nashville, Tennessee)
- Genre: Country; Nashville sound
- Length: 26:20
- Label: RCA Victor
- Producer: Jerry Bradley

Dottie West chronology
Country and West (1970)	Forever Yours (1970)	Country Boy and Country Girl (1970)

Singles from Forever Yours
- 1. "Forever Yours" Released: October 1970

Forever Yours is a studio album by American country music artist Dottie West. It was released in October 1970 on RCA Victor Records and was produced by Jerry Bradley. The album was West's fifteenth studio recording issued in her music career. It was also her second studio record released in 1970. The album contained ten tracks, notably the title track, which became a top thirty hit single in 1970. The album would also reach peak positions on national music charts.

== Background and content ==
Forever Yours was recorded in July 1970 in Nashville, Tennessee at RCA Studio B. The sessions were produced by Jerry Bradley. It was West's first studio project recorded with Bradley. In previous experiences, she had worked alongside Danny Davis and Chet Atkins. For the project, West also wrote the album's liner notes. "I love to sing, love to sing to you, and my songs will be," she said in dedication to the fans. Forever Yours was a collection of ten tracks. Three of the album's songs were composed by West herself. Both "Special Memory" and "Cancel Tomorrow" were co-written with songwriter Red Lane. "The Cold Hand of Fate" was penned entirely by West. Cover versions of songs first recorded by other artists were included for the album as well. Songs West covered for the album included "Rocky Top" by the Osborne Brothers, "Raindrops Keep Fallin' on My Head" by B.J. Thomas and "I Never Once Stopped Loving You" by Connie Smith.

== Release and reception ==
Forever Yours was released in October 1970 on RCA Victor Records, becoming her fifteenth studio album released during her career. It was issued as a vinyl LP, containing five songs on each side of the record. Forever Yours spent a total of four weeks on the Billboard Top Country Albums chart before peaking at number 40 in November 1970.

The only single spawned from the album was the title track, also released in October 1970. Spending a total of 12 weeks on the Billboard Hot Country Singles chart, the song reached number 21 by December. It became West's highest-charting solo single since 1968. Following its release, Forever Yours was reviewed by Billboard in their October 1970 issue. Reviewers praised the album's simple arrangements and West's own songwriting on the album's three tracks. "Miss West's simplicity and gentleness is just right for her latest collection of songs, many of which she penned herself," writers commented.

== Track listing ==
Side one
No.	Title	Writer(s)	Length
1.	"Forever Yours"	Jimmy Peppers	2:36
2.	"Willie's Winter Love"	Merle Haggard	3:54
3.	"I Never Once Stopped Loving You"	Bill Anderson; Jan Howard	3:24
4.	"The Cold Hand of Fate"	Dottie West	2:35
5.	"Cancel Tomorrow"	Red Lane; West	2:08

Side two
No.	Title	Writer(s)	Length
1.	"Rocky Top"	Felice and Boudleaux Bryant	2:38
2.	"Special Memory"	Lane; West	2:17
3.	"Who Put the Leaving in Your Eyes"	Jim Owen	2:07
4.	"Raindrops Keep Fallin' on My Head"	Burt Bacharach; Hal David	2:39
5.	"And I'm Still Missing You"	Chuck Glaser; Jimmy Payne	2:15

== Personnel ==
All credits are adapted from the liner notes of Forever Yours.

Musical personnel

- Harold Bradley – guitar
- Pete Drake – steel guitar
- Ray Edenton – guitar
- Buddy Harman – drums
- The Jordanaires – background vocals
- Millie Kirkham – background vocals
- Grady Martin – guitar
- Charlie McCoy – harmonica, vibes
- Ferrell Morris – percussion
- Bob Moore – bass
- Hargus "Pig" Robbins – piano
- Bobby Thompson – banjo
- Bill West – steel guitar
- Dottie West – lead vocals

Technical personnel

- Jerry Bradley – producer
- Al Pachucki – engineering
- Bob Patrick – photography
- Roy Shockley – engineering

== Chart performance ==
Chart (1970)	Peak position
US Top Country Albums (Billboard)	40

== Release history ==
Region	Date	Format	Label	Ref.
North America	October 1970	Vinyl	RCA Victor	
North America	circa 2023	Music download; streaming	Sony Music Entertainment	
