= It's Dawned on Me You're Gone =

Single by Dottie West

from the album Country and West
- B-side: "Love's Farewell"
- Released: July 1970
- Recorded: March 2, 1970
- Studio: RCA Victor Studio
- Genre: Country; Nashville Sound
- Length: 2:47
- Label: RCA Victor
- Songwriters: Hank Cochran; Red Lane
- Producer: Danny Davis

Dottie West singles chronology
"Till I Can't Take It Anymore" (1970)	"It's Dawned on Me You're Gone" (1970)	"Forever Yours" (1970)

"It's Dawned on Me You're Gone" is a song written by Hank Cochran and Red Lane, and recorded by American country music artist Dottie West. It was released in July 1970 as the first single from the album Country and West. The song became a top 40 chart single on the US country music chart. It was given positive reviews by Billboard and Cashbox following its release.

== Background and recording ==
Dottie West had broken through into mainstream country music with a series Nashville Sound singles like "Here Comes My Baby" (1964), "Country Girl" (1968) and a duet with Don Gibson called "Rings of Gold" (1969). At the RCA Victor label, a series of albums and singles were released through the early 1970s. Among her 1970s releases was "It's Dawned on Me You're Gone". It was co-written by Hank Cochran and Red Lane. The track was cut at the RCA Victor Studio in Nashville, Tennessee on March 2, 1970. The session was produced by Danny Davis.

== Release, chart performance and critical reception ==
"It's Dawned on Me You're Gone" was issued as a single by RCA Victor in July 1970. It was backed on the B-side by the song "Love's Farewell". The disc was distributed as a seven-inch vinyl record. It was promoted as the lead single off of West's 1970 studio album called Country and West. Billboard magazine called the track "strong" in its review while Cashbox magazine commented that "Dottie West's fans should go for this one". "It's Dawned on Me You're Gone" debuted on the US Billboard Hot Country Songs chart on August 1, 1970, and spent a total of ten weeks there. On September 12, the song peaked at the number 37 position. It was the eighteen single of West's career to make the Billboard country top 40.

== Track listing ==
7 inch vinyl single

- "It's Dawned on Me You're Gone" – 2:47
- "Love's Farewell" – 2:22

== Chart performance ==
Chart (1970)	Peak position
US Hot Country Songs (Billboard)	37
