= What I Had with You =

"What I Had With You"

Single by Sheila Andrews
- B-side: "I Gotta Get Back the Feeling"
- Released: 1979
- Genre: Country
- Length: 3:07
- Label: Ovation
- Songwriter(s): Curly Putman, Sonny Throckmorton
- Producer(s): Brien Fisher

Sheila Andrews singles chronology
"I Gotta Get Back The Feeling" (1979)	"What I Had With You" (1979)	"It Don't Get Better Than This" (1980)

"What I Had With You"

Single by John Conlee

from the album Friday Night Blues
- B-side: "We Belong in Love Tonight"
- Released: January 24, 1981
- Genre: Country
- Length: 2:57
- Label: MCA
- Songwriter(s): Curly Putman, Sonny Throckmorton
- Producer(s): Bud Logan

John Conlee singles chronology
"She Can't Say That Anymore" (1980)	"What I Had With You" (1981)	"Could You Love Me (One More Time)" (1981)

"What I Had with You" is a song written by Sonny Throckmorton and Curly Putman. It has been recorded by several country artists, including Jean Shepard and Slim Whitman in 1974, and Tammy Wynette in 1977, Sheila Andrews with guest vocals from Joe Sun in 1979, and most notably John Conlee in January 1981. Conlee's version was released as the third and final single from his album Friday Night Blues and reached number 12 on the Billboard Hot Country Singles chart.

== Chart performance ==
=== Sheila Andrews ===
Chart (1979)	Peak position
US Hot Country Songs (Billboard)	48

=== John Conlee ===
Chart (1981)	Peak position
US Hot Country Songs (Billboard)	12
Canadian RPM Country Tracks	15
