= Ward Davis =

American singer-songwriter

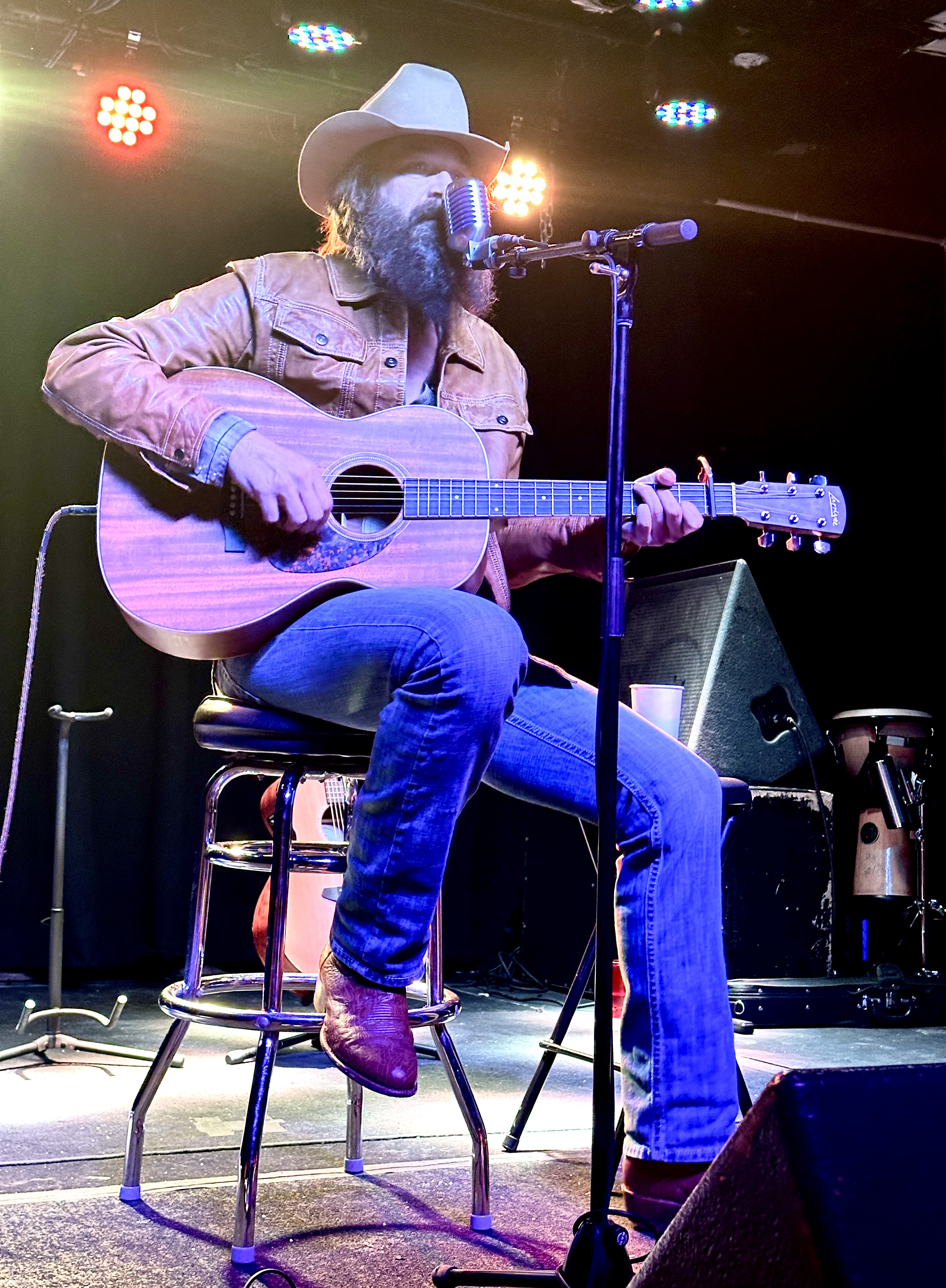
- Ward Davis in Denver, 2024

Background information
- Origin: Monticello, Arkansas
- Genres: Country, Singer-Songwriter
- Years active: 1998–present
- Website: https://warddavismusic.com/

Ward Davis is an American singer-songwriter from Monticello, Arkansas. Davis has had songs recorded by Willie Nelson, Merle Haggard, Trace Adkins, Wade Hayes, Sammy Kershaw, Bucky Covington, Jimmie Van Zant, Buddy Jewel, Carolina Rain, The Roys, Cody Jinks, Whitey Morgan, Paul Cauthen and others. in 2016, Davis co-wrote "I’m Not The Devil" with Cody Jinks, which went to No. 4 on the Billboard US Country Charts. His major debut 2015 album, 15 Years in a 10 Year Town, featured Willie Nelson and Jamey Johnson. "Unfair Weather Friend," a song Davis co-wrote with Marla Cannon-Goodman, was recorded by Willie Nelson and Merle Haggard for their final album collaboration together, Django and Jimmie. At Haggard's request, the song was played at Haggard's funeral in 2016.

== Music career ==
Davis moved to Nashville in 2000 from Monticello, Arkansas, to write and perform music, but was unsatisfied with his achievements. During his time there, he joined Ray Scott's band. After the success of "Unfair Weather Friend," and disillusioned with how he felt Nashville had changed, he decided to leave Music Row and go out on his own, writing and performing himself. He befriended Cody Jinks, with whom he co-wrote "I’m Not the Devil", the title track of Jink's 2016 album. Since then he has written and toured regularly with Jinks, including playing Red Rocks Amphitheater with Clint Black, and appearing on Conan.

== Discography ==
Albums
Title	Album details	Year released
Nobody's Waiting	Self Release	1998
15 Years in a 10 Year Town	Hawkville	2015
Black Cats And Crows	Ward Davis Music, LLC	2020
Live From An Undisclosed Location in Hays, Kansas	Soundly Music	2022
Here I Am	MNRK Music Group	2026

Singles & EPs
Title	Details	Year Released
"Don't Open That Door"	Single	2010
"Last Monday in May"	Single	2015
"West Point To Arlington"	Single	2017
"I'm Not The Devil"	Single	2017
Asunder	EP	2018
"Last Monday in May"	Single	2018
