= Working Man (disambiguation) =

"Working Man" is a 1974 song by Rush.

Working Man or Working Men may refer to:

- Working man, a member of a workforce

== Film ==
- Working Man (film), a 2019 American drama film
- The Working Man, a 1933 American film
- Working Man Trilogy, three American gay pornographic films of the late 1970s
- A Working Man, 2025 American action thriller film

== Music ==
- "Working Man" (John Conlee song), 1985
- "Working Man", a 1990 song by Rita MacNeil
- "Working Man", a song by Imagine Dragons from the deluxe edition of the 2012 album Night Visions
- "The Working Man", a song by Creedence Clearwater Revival from the 1968 album Creedence Clearwater Revival
- Working Man – A Tribute to Rush, a 1996 album by various artists
- Working Men, a 2009 live compilation album by Rush

== See also ==
- Worker (disambiguation)
- Working class, those engaged in waged or salaried labour, especially in manual-labour occupations and industrial work
- Homo ergaster, considered an early form or variety of Homo erectus
- Two Working Men, a pair of 1969 statues by Oisín Kelly in Cork
- Homo faber
