= Before My Time =

Single by John Conlee

from the album Forever
- B-side: "Forever"
- Released: August 11, 1979
- Genre: Country
- Length: 2:40
- Label: MCA
- Songwriter: Ben Peters
- Producer: Bud Logan

John Conlee singles chronology
"Backside of Thirty" (1979)	"Before My Time" (1979)	"Baby, You're Something" (1979)

"Before My Time" is a song written by Ben Peters, and recorded by American country music artist John Conlee. It was released in August 1979 as the first single from the album Forever. The song reached #2 on the Billboard Hot Country Singles & Tracks chart.

== Chart performance ==
Chart (1979)	Peak position
US Hot Country Songs (Billboard)	2
Canadian RPM Country Tracks	1
