= The Way I Am (Merle Haggard song) =

Single by Merle Haggard

from the album The Way I Am
- B-side: "Wake Up"
- Released: March 15, 1980
- Genre: Country
- Length: 2:56
- Label: MCA
- Songwriter: Sonny Throckmorton
- Producers: Fuzzy Owen; Don Gant

Merle Haggard singles chronology
"My Own Kind of Hat" (1979)	"The Way I Am" (1980)	"Bar Room Buddies" (1980)

"The Way I Am" is a song written by Sonny Throckmorton, and recorded by American country music artist Merle Haggard. It was released in March 1980 as the first single and title track from his album The Way I Am. The song reached number 2 on the Billboard Hot Country Singles chart and number 1 on the RPM Country Tracks chart in Canada.

== Charts ==
=== Weekly charts ===
Chart (1980)	Peak position
US Hot Country Songs (Billboard)	2
Canadian RPM Country Tracks	1

=== Year-end charts ===
Chart (1980)	Position
US Hot Country Songs (Billboard)	44

== Cover versions ==
- Alan Jackson recorded a version of the song on his 1999 album Under the Influence.
- Willy Mason recorded the song in 2006 on Australian radio station Triple J's Like a Version segment.
- George Jones recorded the song on 2006 album Kickin' Out the Footlights...Again.
- Bonnie 'Prince' Billy recorded the song on his 2007 album Ask Forgiveness.
- Watermelon Slim recorded the song on his 2009 album Escape from the Chickencoop.
- Cody Jinks recorded the song for his 2016 album I'm Not the Devil.
