= Miss Emily's Picture =

Single by John Conlee

from the album With Love
- B-side: "Love Is What You Need"
- Released: August 29, 1981
- Genre: Country
- Length: 3:33
- Label: MCA
- Songwriter(s): Red Lane
- Producer(s): Bud Logan

John Conlee singles chronology
"Could You Love Me (One More Time)" (1981)	"Miss Emily's Picture" (1981)	"Busted" (1982)

"Miss Emily's Picture" is a song written by Red Lane, and recorded by American country music artist John Conlee. It was released in August 1981 as the second single from the album With Love. The song reached #2 on the Billboard Hot Country Singles & Tracks chart.

== Content ==
The song is about a young man trying to deal with the recent end of a long-term relationship with a woman named Emily. Photographic reminders of her are everywhere, including his nightstand, his office and his billfold, the latter which he shows friends at a nightclub where he stops after work. The photographs, among other things, trigger deep emotional pain and memories of lost love and broken romance, as he finds solace only by "straighten(ing) Miss Emily's picture now and then."

== Chart performance ==
Chart (1981)	Peak position
US Hot Country Songs (Billboard)	2
Canadian RPM Country Tracks	7
