= It Makes No Difference Now =

Single by Cliff Bruner's Texas Wanderers
- Released: 1939
- Genre: Country, honky tonk
- Label: Decca
- Songwriter: Floyd Tillman

"It Makes No Difference Now" is a country honky tonk song written in 1938 by Floyd Tillman and popularized in a 1939 record by Cliff Bruner's Texas Wanderers. Tillman sold the song to Jimmie Davis for $300 before it became a hit. It became the most popular country song of 1939 and has been covered by many country and pop artists, including Davis, Gene Autry, Bing Crosby, Eddy Arnold, Ernest Tubb, Ray Charles, The Supremes, Dottie West, Jerry Lee Lewis, Merle Haggard, and Fats Domino.

== Hit record for Cliff Bruner ==
Cliff Bruner's version of the song was released in 1939 on Decca Records. It became the biggest country hit of 1939, appearing on the Billboard hillbilly chart from March 25, 1939, until November 25, 1939. Bruner's backing band on the record included Moon Mullican (piano), Dickie McBride (guitar and backup vocal), and Leo Raley (mandolin).

== Tillman's composition ==
Although Jimmie Davis is listed as the co-writer on many pressings, Floyd Tillman was the sole composer. Shortly after the song was first published, Davis heard the song and offered Tillman $200 for it; Tillman countered at $400, and they agreed on a purchase price of $300 (equivalent to $6,900 in 2025). Despite the song's enormous success, Tillman did not receive any further compensation. Interviewed in 1941, Tillman insisted he was not bitter and that Davis' purchase of the song was "perfectly legitimate" and said there was "no use thinking about it." According to Tillman's 2003 obituary, he eventually regained the rights.

Tillman was a guitarist in Cliff Bruner's band when he wrote the song. In a 1939 interview, Tillman said that the song was inspired by "life's darkest moments", in particular his best girl turning him down. Tillman said the song "patched up the differences" with his girl, and they were soon married. In a later interview in 1941, Tillman said the idea for the song "was just imagination"; a recording date was approaching, and he decided to think up a song to record.

== Other versions ==
"It Makes No Difference Now" has been recorded by numerous artists, including Tillman himself. Notable versions include:

- In 1938 by Jimmie Davis with Rudy Sooter's Ranchmen on Decca.
- Tom Dickey Show Boys in 1938 for Bluebird.
- Tex Ritter in the 1939 Western film Down the Wyoming Trail.
- Also in 1939: the Light Crust Doughboys on Vocalion, Wilf Carter on Bluebird, and Dick Robertson and His Orchestra on Decca.
- In 1940 by Bing Crosby with Bob Crosby and his Orchestra, which reached No. 23 on the pop chart.
- Gene Autry's version reached No. 3 on the country chart in 1943.
- Eddy Arnold on RCA Victor in 1947.
- Burl Ives on Decca in 1947.
- Piano Red's blues version on RCA Victor in 1951, and again on his 1989 album "Wildfire"
- Hank Thompson and His Brazos Valley Boys on Capitol in 1956.
- Ernest Tubb included it on his 1959 album The Importance of Being Ernest.
- Ray Charles on his 1962 album Modern Sounds in Country and Western Music.
- Don Gibson on his 1962 album Some Favorites of Mine.
- The song's composer Floyd Tillman, on his 1964 album Slippin' Around with Floyd Tillman.
- Floyd Cramer's instrumental version on his 1964 album Country Piano-City Strings.
- The Supremes on their 1965 album The Supremes Sing Country, Western and Pop.
- Dottie West on her 1969 album Dottie Sings Eddy.
- Jerry Lee Lewis on his 1969 album Sings the Country Music Hall of Fame Hits, Vol. 2.
- Merle Haggard on his 1980 album The Way I Am.
- Willie Nelson and Hank Snow as a duet for their 1985 album Brand on My Heart.
- A duet by Tillman and Mel Tillis on the 2004 album The Influence.
- Fats Domino on his 2006 album Alive and Kickin'.
