= Baby, You're Something =

Single by John Conlee

from the album Forever
- B-side: "The In Crowd"
- Released: December 15, 1979
- Genre: Country
- Length: 2:57
- Label: MCA
- Songwriter(s): Curly Putman, Rafe Van Hoy, Don Cook
- Producer(s): Bud Logan

John Conlee singles chronology
"Before My Time" (1979)	"Baby, You're Something" (1979)	"Friday Night Blues" (1980)

"Baby, You're Something" is a song written by Curly Putman, Rafe Van Hoy and Don Cook, and recorded by American country music artist John Conlee. It was released in December 1979 as the second single from the album Forever. The song reached #7 on the Billboard Hot Country Singles & Tracks chart.

== Chart performance ==
Chart (1979–1980)	Peak position
US Hot Country Songs (Billboard)	7
Canadian RPM Country Singlea	7
