= Sweet Desire =

Single by The Kendalls

from the album Old Fashioned Love
- A-side: "Old Fashioned Love"
- Released: August 1978
- Genre: Country, country rock
- Length: 2:32
- Label: Ovation
- Songwriter: Jeannie Kendall
- Producer: Brian Fisher

The Kendalls singles chronology
"Pittsburgh Stealers" (1978)	"Sweet Desire" (1978)	"I Had a Lovely Time" (1979)

"Sweet Desire" is a 1978 single by The Kendalls, released as a double A-side with "Old Fashioned Love". "Sweet Desire" was The Kendalls' fourth top 40 country hit and their second number one on the country chart. The single stayed at number one for one week and spent 15 weeks on the charts. The song is a double-sided single with the b-side "Old Fashioned Love," also listed on the charts.

== Chart performance ==
Chart (1978)	Peak position
U.S. Billboard Hot Country Singles	1
Canadian RPM Country Tracks	2
