= Domestic Life (song) =

Single by John Conlee

from the album American Faces
- B-side: "I Can Sail to China"
- Released: February 1987
- Genre: Country
- Length: 3:54
- Label: Columbia
- Songwriter(s): J.D. Martin, Gary Harrison
- Producer(s): Bud Logan

John Conlee singles chronology
"The Carpenter" (1986)	"Domestic Life" (1987)	"Mama's Rockin' Chair" (1987)

"Domestic Life" is a song written by J.D. Martin and Gary Harrison, and recorded by American country music artist John Conlee. It was released in February 1987 as the first single from the album American Faces. The song reached #4 on the Billboard Hot Country Singles & Tracks chart.

== Chart performance ==
Chart (1987)	Peak position
US Hot Country Songs (Billboard)	4
Canadian RPM Country Tracks	5
