= Friday Night Blues =

Single by John Conlee

from the album Friday Night Blues
- B-side: "When I'm Out of You"
- Released: May 3, 1980
- Genre: Country
- Length: 3:18
- Label: MCA
- Songwriter(s): Sonny Throckmorton; Rafe Van Hoy
- Producer(s): Bud Logan

John Conlee singles chronology
"Baby, You're Something" (1979)	"Friday Night Blues" (1980)	"She Can't Say That Anymore" (1980)

"Friday Night Blues" is a song written by Sonny Throckmorton and Rafe Van Hoy and originally recorded by Throckmorton, whose version of the song went to No. 89 on the Hot Country Songs charts in 1980, released on Mercury Records with "It Always Rains on Me" on the B-side.

Only one month after Throckmorton's version charted, John Conlee released his own rendition of the song, from his album of the same name. Conlee's version charted at No. 2 on Hot Country Songs. Conlee's version of the song was the first credit for session guitarist Brent Rowan, who soon became the only guitarist that Conlee used under the production of Bud Logan.

== Content ==
The title track of his 1980 album, the album's artwork plays off the song's theme: A husband who would rather lie on the couch, watch television and relax after a hard week at work, while his wife is dressed up and wants him to treat her to a Friday night on the town.

The song takes a look at her loneliness and longing for attention from her husband – presumably, he's some sort of businessman who has spent the week on the road making deals – who ignores her when he is at home. Those emotions persist during the week (when he is absent), as she's left to watch daytime television, do typical housework and talk with a neighbor about domestic life, and build to their apex by Friday night ... when she has the "Friday night blues" after she realizes he just wants to stay home and her need for a night out conflicts with his need to de-stress himself on Friday nights.

== Charts ==
=== Weekly charts ===
Chart (1980)	Peak position
US Hot Country Songs (Billboard)	2
Canadian RPM Country Tracks	3

=== Year-end charts ===
Chart (1980)	Position
US Hot Country Songs (Billboard)	32
