= Years After You =

Single by John Conlee

from the album Blue Highway
- B-side: "But She Loves Me"
- Released: October 20, 1984
- Genre: Country
- Length: 3:21
- Label: MCA
- Songwriter: Thom Schuyler
- Producer: Bud Logan

John Conlee singles chronology
"Way Back" (1984)	"Years After You" (1984)	"Working Man" (1985)

"Years After You" is a song written by Thom Schuyler, and recorded by Eddie Rabbitt in 1982 on his Radio Romance album. It was then covered to much greater success in 1984 by American country music artist John Conlee. It was released in October 1984 as the first single from his album Blue Highway. The song reached #2 on the Billboard Hot Country Singles & Tracks chart.

== Content ==
The song is about a middle-aged man who, several years after his breakup with a long-term girlfriend, is still missing her and—despite having his good days—struggling to cope.

== Additional Cover versions ==
- A cover version by Linda Davis was included on her 1992 self-titled album.

== Chart performance ==
Chart (1984–1985)	Peak position
US Hot Country Songs (Billboard)	2
Canadian RPM Country Tracks	2
