= Forever Yours (Dottie West song) =

Single by Dottie West

from the album Forever Yours
- B-side: "The Cold Hand of Fate"
- Released: October 1970
- Recorded: July 1970
- Studio: RCA Victor Studio
- Genre: Country; Nashville Sound
- Length: 2:26
- Label: RCA Victor
- Songwriter: Jimmy Peppers
- Producer: Jerry Bradley

Dottie West singles chronology
"It's Dawned on Me You're Gone" (1970)	"Forever Yours" (1970)	"Slowly" (1971)

"Forever Yours" is a song written by Jimmy Peppers, and recorded by American country music artist Dottie West. It was released in October 1970 as the first single and title track from the album Forever Yours. The song became a top 40 chart single on the US country music chart. It was given positive reviews by Billboard and Cashbox following its release.

== Background and recording ==
Dottie West rose to commercial country music popularity with a series of Nashville Sound-styled singles. Among her top ten songs during the 1960s were "Here Comes My Baby" (1964), "Paper Mansions" (1968) and "Rings of Gold" (1969). She followed the latter recording with "Forever Yours" in 1970. "Forever Yours" was written by Jimmy Peppers. The song was recorded in July 1970 at RCA Victor Studios in Nashville, Tennessee. The session was produced by Jerry Bradley.

== Release, chart performance and critical reception ==
"Forever Yours" was released as a single by RCA Victor in October 1970. It was backed on the B-side by West's self-composed song "The Cold Hand of Fate". The disc was distributed as a seven-inch vinyl record. It was promoted as the lead single off of West's 1970 studio album of the same name. Billboard magazine predicted that the song would make their country top 20 list and described it as a "potent ballad". Despite its prediction, "Forever Yours" just missed the top 20. It debuted on the US Billboard Hot Country Songs chart on October 31, 1970. Remaining for a total of 12 weeks, it reached the number 21 position on December 19, 1970.

== Track listing ==
7 inch vinyl single

- "Forever Yours" – 2:26
- "The Cold Hand of Fate" – 2:21

== Chart performance ==
Chart (1970)	Peak position
US Hot Country Songs (Billboard)	21
