= Mason Dixon (band) =

American country music group

- Origin: Beaumont, Texas, U.S.
- Genres: Country
- Years active: 1979–1993
- Labels: Texas; Premier One; Capitol Nashville
- Past members: Frank Gilligan; Jerry Dengler; Rick Henderson; Terry "Caz" Casburn

Mason Dixon was an American country music group from Beaumont, Texas, composed of Frank Gilligan (vocals, bass guitar), Jerry Dengler (guitar, banjo), and Rick Henderson (guitar). The band played frequently within the Texas nightclub scene for several years and went on to tour the U.S. and Canada for several more.

== Career ==
The group's founding members were lead vocalist Frank Gilligan (born November 2, 1955) and guitarist Rick Henderson (born May 29, 1953), respectively natives of New York and Texas, who met while attending Lamar University in Beaumont, Texas. The two joined with guitarist Jerry Dengler (born May 29, 1955), a former solo artist from Odessa, Texas, and officially founded the band in 1979. The group's first release was a single titled "Armadillo Country". After this song became a regional hit, record producer Don Schafer signed the band to his Texas Records label. The band released its debut album Only a Dream Away in 1983 and released five singles from it. First was a cover of The Police's "Every Breath You Take", followed by "Mason Dixon Lines", "I Never Had a Chance with You", "Gettin' Over You", and the album's title track. All of these songs except for "Mason Dixon Lines" made the Billboard Hot Country Songs charts. "Mason Dixon Lines" was also the band's first music video. A second Texas Records album, The Spirit of Texas, charted the single "Houston Heartache" in 1985.

In 1987, the band moved to the also independent Premier One label, for which they recorded the album Homegrown. This album went on to account for their first top-40 hit on Hot Country Songs that year with "3935 West End Avenue". The success of this song led to them being signed by Capitol Records, who issued their next album Exception to the Rule in 1988. Its title track was the band's highest-charting single, reaching number 35 on Hot Country Songs in 1988. Another single from the album, "When Karen Comes Around", was also made into a music video which aired on CMT.

Henderson left the group in 1989 and was replaced by Terry "Caz" Casburn (vocals, bass). A second album for Capitol, Reach for It, was completed but never released.

In 1990, Mason Dixon was shortlisted for the Academy of Country Music Award for New Vocal Duo or Group of the Year.

After Mason Dixon disbanded in 1993, Gilligan moved to Tomball, Texas and held various jobs. He planned to return to music in 2009, but was unable to after being diagnosed with both colorectal cancer and neuropathy. After recovering from both, he released a solo album titled Silver Dollar in 2015. Gilligan still performs gigs down in Houston, Texas and around the Dallas area.

== Discography ==
=== Albums ===
Year	Album	Label
1983	Only a Dream Away	Texas
1985	The Spirit of Texas	Texas
1987	Homegrown	Premier 1
1988	Exception to the Rule	Capitol
1990	Reach for It	Capitol

=== Singles ===
Year	Single	Chart Positions		Album
Year	Single	US Country	CAN Country	Album
1980	"Armadillo Country"	—	—	single only
1983	"Every Breath You Take"	69	—	Only a Dream Away
1984	"Mason Dixon Lines"	—	—	Only a Dream Away
1984	"I Never Had a Chance with You"	51	—	Only a Dream Away
1984	"Gettin' Over You"	49	—	Only a Dream Away
1985	"Only a Dream Away"	47	—	Only a Dream Away
1985	"Houston Heartache"	76	—	The Spirit of Texas
1986	"Got My Heart Set on You"	72	—	singles only
1986	"Home Grown"	53	—	Homegrown
1987	"3935 West End Avenue"	39	—	Homegrown
1987	"Don't Say No Tonight"	51	—	Homegrown
1988	"Dangerous Road"	62	—	Exception to the Rule
1988	"When Karen Comes Around"	49	—	Exception to the Rule
1989	"Exception to the Rule"	35	63	Exception to the Rule
1989	"A Mountain Ago"	52	—	Exception to the Rule
1990	"Ride of a Lifetime"	—	—	Reach for It

=== Music videos ===
Year	Video	Director
1984	"Mason Dixon Lines"	
1988	"When Karen Comes Around"	
1990	"Ride of a Lifetime"	Jim May/Coke Sams
