= Cody Jinks =

American singer-songwriter (born 1980)

- Born: Meredith Cody Jinks; August 18, 1980 (age 46)
- Origin: Haltom City, Texas, U.S.
- Genres: Country; Texas country; outlaw country; neotraditional country; Southern rock
- Occupations: Singer; songwriter
- Years active: 1998–present
- Labels: Cody Jinks; Late August Records
- Website: codyjinks.com

Meredith Cody Jinks (born August 18, 1980) is an American outlaw country music singer and songwriter. His breakout 2016 album, I'm Not the Devil, reached No. 4 on the Billboard Country Albums chart, while a number of other albums such as Lifers, After the Fire, and The Wanting reached No. 2 on the same chart.

== Early life ==
Cody Jinks is a native of Haltom City, near Fort Worth, Texas, United States, and attended Haltom High School. He started learning to play a few country music riffs on the guitar from his father when he was 16, but soon formed a heavy metal band.

== Music career ==
Jinks started out as the lead singer of a thrash metal band from Fort Worth named Unchecked Aggression, initially named Silas, that was active from 1998 to 2003. He also played the lead guitar; the other band members were Gary Burkham on bass who left in 2000 and was replaced by Chris Lewis, Anthony Walker on drums, and Ben Heffley on guitar. They were influenced by Metallica and Pantera. An album, The Massacre Begins was released in 2002. Songs they recorded included "Hell Razor" and "Kill Me Again". The band however broke up after a trip to Los Angeles, and Jinks took a year off from music. In around 2005, he started playing country music, the music he grew up with.

Jinks is backed by The Tone Deaf Hippies. He began to release albums in the country genre in 2008. An album titled 30 was released in 2012. He began to develop his own sound in an EP, Blacksheep, which was released in 2013.

=== 2015: Adobe Sessions ===
The album was recorded at the Sonic Ranch in Tornillo, Texas, and the album title was named after a small adobe room they recorded the album in. It was released in January 2015 and charted in Billboard's regional Heatseekers charts – No.2 on Heatseekers South Central and No. 8 on Heatseekers Mountain. Jinks toured in support of Adobe Sessions as an opener for Sturgill Simpson in 2015.

=== 2016: I'm Not the Devil ===
I'm Not the Devil was released on August 12, 2016. The album was recorded at the Sonic Ranch in Tornillo, Texas. It includes a cover of Merle Haggard's "The Way I Am". The title track was written with his best friend Ward Davis; the album was almost finished and the album title had already been decided, but it was retitled with the name of the song they wrote. The album debuted at No. 4 on the Top Country Albums chart, selling 11,300 copies in the first week. Jinks supported I'm Not the Devil with a co-headlining tour with Whitey Morgan and the 78's in August, September, and October. The album was rated one of the best country albums of 2016 by Rolling Stone.

Jinks released a cover of Pink Floyd's hit song "Wish You Were Here" in January 2017. He also re-released a remixed and remastered version of his 2010 album Less Wise, as Less Wise Modified 2017, with three bonus tracks included.

=== 2018: Lifers ===
Jinks released the album Lifers on July 27, 2018, via Rounder Records. It was preceded by the lead single "Must Be the Whiskey", which was released on June 15, 2018.

=== 2019: After the Fire and The Wanting ===
On October 11, 2019, Jinks released the album After the Fire. The album was independently produced and released by his own label, Late August Records, marking a departure from Rounder Records, with whom he produced 2018's Lifers. The album was preceded by two singles, "Ain't a Train" and "Think Like You Think". Jinks also promoted the song "William and Wanda", which was written about his late grandparents. For the week of October 26, 2019, the album was No. 2 on the Billboard Top Country Albums chart.

One week later, October 18, 2019, Jinks released a second album, The Wanting. Similar to After the Fire, the album was independently produced. It was preceded by two singles, "Same Kind of Crazy as Me" and "Which One I Feed".

On October 24, 2019, both albums held the No. 1 and 2 spots for Top Albums on iTunes and Apple Music.

=== 2021: Mercy and None the Wiser ===
On November 12, 2021, Jinks released two albums simultaneously – Mercy and None the Wiser. Mercy is a solo country album, while None the Wiser is a metal recorded with his band Caned By Nod. The albums were written at different times, but recorded simultaneously. Mercy features collaborations with Kendell Marvel, Adam Hood, and Chris Shiflett. "All It Cost Me Was Everything" was released from Mercy.

=== 2024: Change the Game ===
Change the Game was released in March 2024. It features songs such as “Outlaws and Mustangs”, and reached the top 30 in the country chart.

=== 2025: In My Blood ===
In July 2025, Jinks released In My Blood on his own Late August Records label. Recorded at The Sonic Ranch, the album features a collaboration with Blackberry Smoke's Charlie Starr. The first single from the album, “Found”, was released on May 2.

== Discography ==
=== Studio albums ===
| Title | Album details | Peak chart positions | | | | Sales | Certifications |
| Title | Album details | US | US Country | US Indie | UK Country | Sales | Certifications |
|---|---|---|---|---|---|---|---|
| Collector's Item | Release date: 2006; Label: Cody Jinks | — | — | — | — | | |
| Cast No Stones | Release date: 2008; Label: Cody Jinks | — | — | — | — | | |
| Less Wise Less Wise Modified (2017 version with three extra tracks) | Release date: June 28, 2010 December 8, 2017 (2017 version); Label: Cody Jinks | — | — | — | — | US: 1,800 | |
| 30 | Release date: April 11, 2012; Label: Cody Jinks | — | — | — | — | | |
| Adobe Sessions | Release date: January 12, 2015; Label: Cody Jinks Music | — | — | — | — | | RIAA: Gold |
| I'm Not the Devil | Release date: August 12, 2016; Label: Cody Jinks Music | 39 | 4 | 3 | — | US: 67,100 | |
| Lifers | Release date: July 27, 2018; Label: Rounder | 11 | 2 | — | — | US: 56,500 | |
| After the Fire | Release date: October 11, 2019; Label: Late August | 33 | 2 | 3 | — | US: 20,000 | |
| The Wanting | Release date: October 18, 2019; Label: Late August | 35 | 2 | 2 | 15 | US: 19,900 | |
| Mercy | Release date: November 12, 2021; Label: Late August | 80 | 12 | 12 | — | | |
| None the Wiser (with Caned By Nod) | Release date: November 12, 2021; Label: Late August | — | — | — | — | | |
| Change the Game | Release date: March 22, 2024; Label: Late August | 128 | 27 | — | 13 | | |
| In My Blood | Release date: July 25, 2025; Label: Late August | 40 | | | | | |
"—" denotes releases that did not chart

=== Live albums ===
| Title | Album details |
|---|---|
| Red Rocks Live | Release date: December 4, 2020; Label: Late August Records |

=== Extended plays ===
| Title | EP details |
|---|---|
| Blacksheep | Release date: June 18, 2013; Label: Cody Jinks |

=== Singles ===
| Year | Title | Sales | Certifications | Album |
|---|---|---|---|---|
| 2018 | "Must Be the Whiskey" | US: 27,000 | RIAA: Platinum | Lifers |
| 2019 | "Somewhere Between I Love You and I'm Leavin'" | | | Lifers |
| 2020 | "Watch the World Die" | | | Watch the World Die |
| 2021 | "Hurt You" | | | Mercy |
| 2022 | "Loud and Heavy" | | | Adobe Sessions |
| 2024 | "Outlaws and Mustangs" | | | Change the Game |
| 2025 | "Found" | | | In My Blood |
