= I Don't Remember Loving You =

Single by John Conlee

from the album Busted
- B-side: "Two Hearts"
- Released: October 2, 1982
- Genre: Country
- Length: 3:50
- Label: MCA
- Songwriter(s): Harlan Howard, Bobby Braddock
- Producer(s): Bud Logan

John Conlee singles chronology
"Nothing Behind You, Nothing in Sight" (1982)	"I Don't Remember Loving You" (1982)	"Common Man" (1983)

"I Don't Remember Loving You" is a song written by Harlan Howard and Bobby Braddock, and recorded by American country music artist John Conlee. It was released in October 1982 as the third single from the album Busted. The song reached #10 on the Billboard Hot Country Singles & Tracks chart.

== Content ==
The song is about a man driven insane by his lover's infidelities and unable to recognize her when she visits him in a psychiatric hospital.

== Chart performance ==
Chart (1982)	Peak position
US Hot Country Songs (Billboard)	10
Canadian RPM Country Tracks	3
