= Mama's Rockin' Chair =

Single by John Conlee

from the album American Faces
- B-side: "Faded Brown Eyes"
- Released: July 1987
- Genre: Country
- Length: 3:26
- Label: Columbia
- Songwriter(s): Tim Mensy, Johnny MacRae
- Producer(s): Bud Logan

John Conlee singles chronology
"Domestic Life" (1987)	"Mama's Rockin' Chair" (1987)	"Living Like There's No Tomorrow (Finally Got to Me Tonight)" (1987)

"Mama's Rockin' Chair" is a song recorded by the American country music artist John Conlee. It was released in July 1987 as the second single from the album American Faces. The song reached #11 on the Billboard Hot Country Singles & Tracks chart. The song was written by Tim Mensy and Johnny MacRae.

== Chart performance ==
Chart (1987)	Peak position
US Hot Country Songs (Billboard)	11
Canadian RPM Country Tracks	7
