= She Can't Say That Anymore =

Single by John Conlee

from the album Friday Night Blues
- B-side: "Always True"
- Released: September 13, 1980
- Genre: Country
- Length: 2:39
- Label: MCA
- Songwriter(s): Sonny Throckmorton
- Producer(s): Bud Logan

John Conlee singles chronology
"Friday Night Blues" (1980)	"She Can't Say That Anymore" (1980)	"What I Had with You" (1981)

"She Can't Say That Anymore" is a song written by Sonny Throckmorton, and recorded by American country music performer John Conlee. It was released in September 1980 as the second single from the album Friday Night Blues. The song reached No. 2 on the Billboard Hot Country Singles & Tracks chart.

New York–based no wave artist Cristina covered this song on her second album Sleep It Off.

== Chart performance ==
Chart (1980)	Peak position
US Hot Country Songs (Billboard)	2
Canadian RPM Country Tracks	11
