= Joe Sun =

American singer-songwriter (1943–2019)

- Born: James Joseph Paulsen; September 25, 1943; Rochester, Minnesota, U.S.
- Died: October 25, 2019 (aged 76) Palm Bay, Florida, U.S.
- Genres: Country
- Occupation: Singer-songwriter
- Instrument(s): Vocals, guitar
- Years active: 1978–2019
- Labels: Ovation, Elektra, Dixiefrog, Crazy

James Joseph Paulsen (September 25, 1943 – October 25, 2019), known professionally as Joe Sun, was an American country music singer-songwriter. Recording for the Ovation and Elektra Records labels, Sun charted fourteen singles on the Hot Country Songs charts. His highest was his 1978 debut single, the No. 14 "Old Flames Can't Hold a Candle to You."

== Biography ==
He was born in Rochester, Minnesota, United States. He spent his youth in college and then in the Air Force. He did various jobs, such as working as a DJ at Radio WMAD in Madison, Wisconsin and at a Key West, Florida rock station and he spent two years with a computer firm in Chicago. While in Madison, he sang with a variety of semi-pro bands, working under the name "Jack Daniels". He acquired his style listening to southern music on country's 50,000 watt WSM and rhythm and blues WLAC radio.

In 1972, he made his way to Nashville, Tennessee, giving himself five years to "make it" as a musician. For a time, he ran a small graphics business called The Sun Shop, then took up independent record promotions, which led to signing with the Ovation Records label towards the end of 1977.

Joe Sun's debut and his first single on Ovation Records "Old Flames (Can't Hold A Candle To You)" was released in May 1978 and climbed steadily up the country charts, reaching the Top 20. Further hits followed on Ovation Records with "High And Dry" (1978), "On Business For The King" (1979), "Blue Ribbon Blues" (1979), "Out Of Your Mind" (1979/1980), "What I Had With You" (1980), "Shotgun Rider" (1980), "Bombed, Boozed, And Busted" (1980), and "Ready For the Times to Get Better" (1980), an innovative re-make of Crystal Gayle's 1978 No. 1 hit. By the time his third album, Livin' On Honky Tonk Time was released, the record company Ovation closed down. Sun signed with Elektra, who purchased Ovation in 1981. At that time he recorded "I Ain't Honky Tonkin' No More". The album Best of Joe Sun was released by Elektra.

Sun recorded The Sun Never Sets for Sonet in 1987, followed by Twilight Zone with Dixiefrog in 1986 and Hank Bogart Still Lives with Dixiefrog in 1989. This album was outsold in France only by Randy Travis. In 1991, Dixiefrog released Out on the Road, after Sun's five-month European tour.

Sun's first solo album effort, the 1992 Dixie and Me, made its debut on Austria's Crazy Music. Its response prompted the 1994 CD release of Some Old Memories by the same record label. An album and a video for Some Old Memories were released in 1994 by Crazy Music and was broadcast on SF1, a Swiss television station and 3SAT, a German/Austrian/Swiss television station. Sun released the Heartbreak Saloon CD in 1991 with Dixiefrog. He wrote twelve of the fifteen songs on the album.

Sun released 15 albums and performed in the United States and Europe. He also recorded national radio spots for Budweiser and Timberline Boots. Besides being featured on television shows, having produced two Grammy Award-nominated foreign albums in 1989 and 1990, Sun also acted as Tommy Fratter in the film Marie alongside Sissy Spacek, Jeff Daniels and Morgan Freeman.

Sun died in Palm Bay, Florida, on October 25, 2019.

== Discography ==
=== Albums ===
Year	Album	US Country	Label
1978	Old Flames	—	Ovation
1979	Out of Your Mind	34	Ovation
1980	Livin' on Honky Tonk Time	—	Ovation
1981	I Ain't Honky Tonkin' No More	28	Elektra
1982	The Best	—	Elektra
1984	Sun Never Sets	—	Sonet
1988	Twilight Zone	—	Dixiefrog
1989	Hank Bogart Still Lives	—	Dixiefrog
1994	Some Old Memories 1988–1993	—	Dixiefrog
1998	Heartbreak Saloon	—	Dixiefrog
2006	Dixie and Me	—	Crazy

=== Singles ===
Year	Single	Chart Positions			Album
Year	Single	US Country	US	CAN Country	Album
1978	"Old Flames Can't Hold a Candle to You"	14	—	29	Old Flames
1978	"High and Dry"	20	—	33	Old Flames
1979	"On Business for the King"	27	—	—	Old Flames
1979	"Blue Ribbon Blues"	flip	—	47	Old Flames
1979	"I'd Rather Go on Hurtin'"	20	—	55	Out of Your Mind
1979	"Out Of Your Mind"	34	—	54	Out of Your Mind
1980	"Shotgun Rider"	23	71	13	Out of Your Mind
1980	"Bombed, Boozed, and Busted"	21	—	8	Livin' on Honky Tonk Time
1980	"Ready for the Times to Get Better"	43	—	19	Livin' on Honky Tonk Time
1982	"Holed Up in Some Honky Tonk"	40	—	—	I Ain't Honky Tonkin' No More
1982	"Fraulein" (with Shotgun)	57	—	—	I Ain't Honky Tonkin' No More
1982	"You Make Me Want to Sing"	85	—	—	The Best
1984	"Bad for Me"	73	—	—	Sun Never Sets
1985	"Why Would I Want to Forget"	77	—	—	single only

=== Guest singles ===
Year	Single	Artist	Chart Positions	Album
Year	Single	Artist	US Country	Album
1980	"What I Had With You"	Sheila Andrews	48	single only
