= The Way I Am (Merle Haggard album) =

Studio album by Merle Haggard
- Released: April 1980
- Genre: Country
- Length: 34:37
- Label: MCA 3229
- Producer: Fuzzy Owen, Don Gant, Porter Wagoner

Merle Haggard chronology
Serving 190 Proof (1979)	The Way I Am (1980)	Back to the Barrooms (1980)

Singles from The Way I Am
- 1. "The Way I Am" Released: March 15, 1980

The Way I Am is the thirtieth studio album by American country music artist Merle Haggard, released in 1980.

== Background ==
In 1979, Haggard joined Charlie Daniels and Ernest Tubb on a remake of Tubb's "Walking the Floor Over You," which became a minor hit that fall, and on The Way I Am Haggard pays further tribute to the Texas legend by covering three more of his songs: "Take Me Back and Try Me One More Time," "I'll Always Be Glad to Take You Back," and "It's Been So Long, Darlin'." It also features a rendition of Floyd Tillman's classic statement of romantic fatalism, "It Makes No Difference Now." The LP's hit single was the Sonny Throckmorton-penned title track, which reached #2 on the Billboard country singles chart. Haggard, who wrote nearly all of his previous album Serving 190 Proof, provides only four original compositions here, with David Cantwell commenting in his 2013 Haggard biography The Running Kind, "Merle's songwriting ran hot and cold during his MCA tenure, but his vocals were always nuanced and hauntingly melodic..." The album was produced by Haggard's longtime manager Fuzzy Owen, fellow country star Porter Wagoner, and Don Gant, who had also worked with Haggard's hero Lefty Frizzell.

After recording this album, Haggard would score his first #1 hit since 1976's "Cherokee Maiden" with "Bar Room Buddies," a duet he recorded with actor Clint Eastwood for the soundtrack to the film Bronco Billy.

== Critical reception ==
Professional ratings
Review scores
Source	Rating
AllMusic	3/5 stars
Robert Christgau	B+

The LP was released in April 1980 and peaked at number 16 on the Billboard country album charts.

AllMusic critic Stephen Thomas Erlewine describes The Way I Am as "pretty much a straight-ahead honky tonk album that pays little mind to the contemporary trends of the day. Where it differs from Serving 190 Proof or Back to the Barrooms is that the performances are a little inconsistent, as is the material." Music critic Robert Christgau wrote "... Haggard's chief value has been vocal ever since "Okie From Muskogee" saddled him with an image, and here his resonant, reflective baritone transforms three Ernest Tubb tunes from standards into timeless pieces of Americana."

== Track listing ==
All tracks composed by Merle Haggard; except where indicated

1. "The Way I Am" (Sonny Throckmorton) – 2:56
2. "Sky-Bo" – 3:32
3. "No One to Sing For (But the Band)" – 3:34
4. "(Remember Me) I'm the One Who Loves You" (Stuart Hamblen) – 3:00
5. "Life's Just Not the Way It Used to Be" – 2:53
6. "Wake Up" – 4:06
7. "Where Have You Been" (Leona Williams) – 2:50
8. "Take Me Back and Try Me One More Time" (Ernest Tubb) – 2:51
9. "I'll Always Be Glad to Take You Back" (Tubb) – 3:19
10. "It Makes No Difference Now" (Jimmie Davis, Floyd Tillman) – 3:08
11. "It's Been So Long, Darlin'" (Tubb) – 3:01

== Personnel ==
- Merle Haggard – vocals, guitar

== Production notes ==
- Produced by Porter Wagoner, Don Gant, Fuzzy Owen
- Engineered by Russ Bracher

== Chart performance ==
Chart (1980)	Peak position
U.S. Billboard Top Country Albums	16
