= The Carpenter (Guy Clark song) =

Single by John Conlee

from the album Harmony
- B-side: "I'll Be Seeing You"
- Released: September 1986
- Genre: Country
- Length: 3:10
- Label: Columbia
- Songwriter(s): Guy Clark
- Producer(s): Bud Logan

John Conlee singles chronology
"Got My Heart Set on You" (1986)	"The Carpenter" (1986)	"Domestic Life" (1987)

"The Carpenter" is a song written by Guy Clark and released on his 1983 album, Better Days. It was covered by American country music artist John Conlee in September 1986 as the third single from his album Harmony. The song reached #6 on the Billboard Hot Country Singles chart in January 1987 and #1 on the RPM Country Tracks chart in Canada.

== Chart performance ==
Chart (1986–1987)	Peak position
US Hot Country Songs (Billboard)	6
Canadian RPM Country Tracks	1
