= With Love (John Conlee album) =

Studio album by John Conlee
- Released: 1981
- Genre: Country
- Length: 30:47
- Label: MCA
- Producer: Bud Logan

John Conlee chronology
Friday Night Blues (1981)	With Love (1981)	Busted (1982)

Singles from With Love
- 1. "Could You Love Me (One More Time)" Released: 1981; 2. "Miss Emily's Picture" Released: August 29, 1981

With Love is the fourth studio album by American country music artist John Conlee. It was released in 1981 via MCA Records. The album includes the singles "Could You Love Me (One More Time)" and "Miss Emily's Picture".

== Track listing ==
No.	Title	Writer(s)	Length
1.	"Miss Emily's Picture"	Red Lane	3:34
2.	"The Staying Side of Goodbye"	Rafe Van Hoy, Don Cook	2:53
3.	"I'd Rather Have What We Had"	Bobby Braddock	3:08
4.	"Only Oklahoma Away"	Curly Putman, Bucky Jones	3:21
5.	"What's a Couple More"	Dennis Wilson	2:44
6.	"Could You Love Me (One More Time)"	Carter Stanley	2:43
7.	"Love Is What You Need"	Mark Paden	2:46
8.	"I Feel Like Loving You Again"	Braddock, Sonny Throckmorton	3:01
9.	"When It Hurts You the Most"	Van Hoy, Cook	3:18
10.	"What's Forever For"	Van Hoy	3:19

== Personnel ==
Adapted from liner notes.

- Electric Guitars: Barry "Byrd" Burton, Brent Rowan
- Acoustic guitar, harmonica: Mark Casstevens
- Dobro, Steel Guitar: Larry Sasser
- Bass Guitar: Joe Osborn
- Piano: Dennis Burnside
- Drums: Eddie Bayers
- Fiddle: Buddy Spicher
- Lead Vocals: John Conlee
- Background Vocals: John Conlee, Sherilyn Huffman, Wendy Suits, Judy Taylor, Dennis Wilson

== Chart performance ==
Chart (1981)	Peak position
US Top Country Albums (Billboard)	22
