= Old School (John Conlee song) =

Single by John Conlee

from the album Greatest Hits 2
- B-side: "She Loves My Troubles Away"
- Released: October 26, 1985
- Genre: Country
- Length: 3:55
- Label: MCA
- Songwriter(s): Russell Smith, Don Schlitz
- Producer(s): Bud Logan

John Conlee singles chronology
"Blue Highway" (1985)	"Old School" (1985)	"Harmony" (1986)

"Old School" is a song written by Russell Smith and Don Schlitz, and recorded by American country music artist John Conlee. It was released in October 1985 as the first single from his Greatest Hits 2 compilation album. The song reached #5 on the Billboard Hot Country Singles & Tracks chart.

== Content ==
The song is a middle-aged man's reflection of his high school sweetheart, whom he meets up with during a high school reunion. The reunion brings back memories of their days at the "old school" – high school days where they spent all their free time together. After graduation, the two part ways; while he becomes a truck driver and family man, her marriage to a highly-successful businessman makes front-page headlines. This news has him pining for her, but instead, he chooses to drive by the "old school" and reflect on memories together.

Eventually, he learns that his high school sweetheart was abandoned or predeceased by her husband (after having "made his mark on the world"), left with several children and a big house with swimming pool; her children now go to the "old school."

At the reunion's dance, the two meet up and recall their memories. She talks him into a slow dance together and – apparently lonely – asks if they could run away together and have it "be just like before," before asking him to call. However, he declines the temptation, telling her he's from the "old school," taking on the phrase's other meaning: That he adheres to traditional values of fidelity, and that his heart is staying true to his wife, before expressing disappointment that she is no longer from the "old school."

== Chart performance ==
Chart (1985–1986)	Peak <position
US Hot Country Songs (Billboard)	5
Canadian RPM Country Tracks	6
