= The Wanting (Cody Jinks album) =

Studio album by Cody Jinks
- Released: October 18, 2019
- Genre: Country
- Length: 44:32
- Label: Late August

Cody Jinks chronology
After the Fire (2019)	The Wanting (2019)

The Wanting is the tenth studio album by American country music artist Cody Jinks. It was released on October 18, 2019 through Late August Records, one week after Jinks released his previous studio album After the Fire.

== Critical reception ==
Stephen Thomas Erlewine of AllMusic states "The Wanting is lean and low-key, a record that doesn't push its themes or sounds too hard" and "perhaps Jinks has his tongue somewhat in cheek, but all the old outlaw signifiers are presented as sincere. That slight hint of self-awareness helps give The Wanting a lightness during its songs of alcoholism, loneliness, and lost love, a lightness that helps make the record a balm during tough times." Josh Schott of Country Perspective similarly gave the album a favorable review, rating it a "8/10" and writing that "The Wanting is an album full of deep introspection and some fun moments too".

== Track listing ==
All tracks are written by Cody Jinks.

No.	Title	Length
1.	"The Wanting"	2:58
2.	"Same Kind of Crazy as Me"	3:49
3.	"Never Alone Always Lonely"	4:11
4.	"Whiskey"	3:21
5.	"Where Even Angels Fear to Fly"	4:30
6.	"Which One I Feed"	3:40
7.	"A Bite of Something Sweet"	3:50
8.	"The Plea"	4:00
9.	"It Don’t Rain in California"	3:09
10.	"Wounded Mind"	4:05
11.	"Ramble"	3:45
12.	"The Raven and the Dove"	3:24
Total length:		44:32

== Chart positions ==
Chart (2016–2019)	Peak position
UK Country Artists Albums	15
US Billboard 200	35
US Top Country Albums	2
US Independent Albums	2
