= Harmony (John Conlee song) =

Single by John Conlee

from the album Harmony
- B-side: "She Told Me So"
- Released: February 22, 1986
- Genre: Country
- Length: 3:21
- Label: Columbia
- Songwriter(s): Jimbeau Hinson, Rick Ellsworth
- Producer(s): Bud Logan

John Conlee singles chronology
"Old School" (1985)	"Harmony" (1986)	"Got My Heart Set on You" (1986)

"Harmony" is a song written by Jimbeau Hinson and Rick Ellsworth, and recorded by American country music artist John Conlee. It was released in February 1986 as the first single and title track from the album Harmony. The song reached #10 on the Billboard Hot Country Singles & Tracks chart.

== Chart performance ==
Chart (1986)	Peak position
US Hot Country Songs (Billboard)	10
Canadian RPM Country Tracks	19
