= Way Back (John Conlee song) =

Single by John Conlee

from the album In My Eyes
- B-side: "Together Alone"
- Released: June 23, 1984
- Genre: Country
- Length: 3:10
- Label: MCA
- Songwriter(s): Jerry Fuller
- Producer(s): Bod Logan

John Conlee singles chronology
"As Long as I'm Rockin' with You" (1984)	"Way Back" (1984)	"Years After You" (1984)

"Way Back" is a song written by Jerry Fuller, and recorded by American country music artist John Conlee. It was released in June 1984 as the fourth single from the album In My Eyes. The song reached #4 on the Billboard Hot Country Singles & Tracks chart.

== Chart performance ==
Chart (1984)	Peak position
US Hot Country Songs (Billboard)	4
Canadian RPM Country Tracks	2
