= The Kendalls =

American country music duo

- Origin: St. Louis, Missouri, United States
- Genres: Country, Country pop
- Years active: 1969–1998
- Labels: Stop; Dot; United Artists; Ovation; Mercury; MCA; Step One; Epic; Lonesome Dove
- Past members: Royce Kendall; Jeannie Kendall

The Kendalls were an American country music duo, consisting of Royce Kendall (born Royce Everet Kuykendall in Saint Louis, Missouri, September 25, 1927 – May 22, 1998) and his daughter Jeannie Kendall (born Jeanie Marie Kuykendall on November 13, 1948).Between the 1960s and 1990s, they released 16 albums on various labels, including five on Mercury Records. Between 1977 and 1985, 22 of their singles reached the top 40 on the Billboard country singles charts, including three number-one hits: "Heaven's Just a Sin Away" (also a number-69 pop hit), "Sweet Desire", and "Thank God for the Radio". Eight other singles also reached the top 10. The Kendalls continues performing today as Jeannie Kendall, one of the original founding members, joined by Carl Acuff Jr. with a newly released CD “You Got Me” in 2022 recorded on Leaping Hawk Record Label. Includes another hit from writer Jerry Gillespie (Heaven's Just A Sin Away) ”Island In The Kitchen” and co writer Dan Willis. Jeannie Kendall is currently signed with Leaping Hawk Records in the Ozarks working with Bonnie and Rune Trulove.

== Career ==
Royce Kendall and his brother Floyce Kendall were raised in Missouri, with family roots in the Arkansas Ozarks. As young men, the brothers formed a duo and moved to California, where they recorded and performed on regional West Coast country television shows as The Austin Brothers. When they broke up, Royce and his wife Melba moved back to Missouri.

Royce and Melba Kendall's daughter Jeannie proved to be musically talented from an early age, and as a teenager, she became her father's duet partner. In 1969, when Jeannie was 20 years old, the Kendalls recorded an album for Stop Records, from which a single was released in 1970: a cover of John Denver's "Leaving on a Jet Plane" (previously a hit for Peter, Paul & Mary). The Kendalls' version narrowly missed the top 50 on the U.S. country chart.

On June 27, 1970, Jeannie provided vocals for the duet "I Wouldn't Have You Any Other Way" on Ringo Starr's country album Beaucoups of Blues.

The duo signed with Dot Records in 1972, and released an album and two singles, "Two Divided By Love", (a cover version of The Grass Roots' pop hit) and "Everything I Own", a cover of Bread's 1972 hit.

The Kendalls parted with Dot before signing with the independent Ovation label in 1977. Their first single for the label, a cover of the Kitty Wells hit "Making Believe," made the lower regions of the charts, but was largely overlooked because Emmylou Harris' version of "Making Believe" hit the U.S. country chart around the same time.

The Kendalls' second single on Ovation, a "cheating" song called "Heaven's Just a Sin Away", proved to be their breakthrough. The song topped the country charts, was a minor crossover pop hit, and won the 1978 Grammy Award for Best Country Vocal by a Duo or Group.

Subsequent hits included "Just Like Real People", "It Don't Feel Like Sinnin' to Me", "Sweet Desire", "You'd Make an Angel Want to Cheat", and a cover of Dolly Parton's "Put It Off Until Tomorrow". (Jeannie Kendall's powerful soprano has often been compared to Parton's.) In 1981, after Ovation Records closed their doors, the duo signed with Mercury Records, and continued to have hits with the "Teach Me To Cheat" and "If You're Waitin' On Me (You're Backin' Up)", which both made the country top 10. More hits followed with "Movin' Train" and "Precious Love", which made the top 20.

Their last number-one country hit, 1984's "Thank God for the Radio", was also their last single to reach the top 10. Their last top-20 hits came in 1984 and 1985 with "My Baby's Gone" and "I'll Dance Every Dance With You". In 1986, they signed with MCA Records, where they scored three midlevel hits. In 1987, they signed with Step One Records, where they scored several minor hits. In 1989, they signed with Epic Records, where their last chart single, "Blue, Blue Day", made the top 70.

Jeannie Kendall was married to Mack Watkins. In the early 1990s, the Kendalls built a supper club in Gulf Shores, Alabama, which featured nightly performances by them; the club closed down two years later. Afterward, they began performing in Branson, Missouri, where the two families had built homes next door to each other. The Kendalls continued to tour and perform and released several CDs, until May 22, 1998, when Royce Kendall died from a stroke while on tour in Marquette, Iowa. Jeannie Kendall, one of the original founding members of the Kendalls continues to tour and sing today with Carl Acuff Jr. They appear monthly at the Nashville Roadhouse Live, The Branson Star Theater in Branson Missouri. Jeannie Kendall is currently signed with Leaping Hawk Records, in the Ozarks. Jeannie and Carl tour as The Kendalls performing past hits and new.

== Jeannie Kendall's solo career ==
In the years since her father's death, Jeannie has pursued a solo career, recording two solo albums, including a self-titled acoustic/bluegrass CD on the Rounder label that featured two songs recorded with Royce and several guest artists. These guest artists included Alan Jackson, Ricky Skaggs, Alison Krauss, Rhonda Vincent, and Johnny Long, who had been the Kendalls' backup singer on the road. The second was All The Girls I Am, a much harder-edged pop/country CD released in 2005 on Golden. In 2022 she released an album with Carl Acuff Jr. entitled “You Got Me” recorded on The Leaping Hawk Records label.

Jeannie continues to tour and perform as The Kendalls, teaming up with Carl Acuff Jr. on harmony and lead vocals. The Kendalls released a new single “Island in The Kitchen” on CDX on the Leaping Hawk Records label, working with Bonnie and Rune Trulove, in 2022. The Kendalls are managed by the Truloves.
