= American Faces =

Studio album by John Conlee
- Released: March 3, 1987
- Genre: Country
- Length: 35:37
- Label: Columbia
- Producer: Bud Logan

John Conlee chronology
Harmony (1986)	American Faces (1987)	Fellow Travelers (1989)

Singles from American Faces
- 1. "Domestic Life" Released: February 1987; 2. "Mama's Rockin' Chair" Released: July 1987; 3. "Living Like There's No Tomorrow" Released: 1987

American Faces is the ninth studio album by American country music artist John Conlee. It was released in 1987 via Columbia Records. The album includes the singles "Domestic Life", "Mama's Rockin' Chair" and "Living Like There's No Tomorrow".

== Track listing ==
No.	Title	Writer(s)	Length
1.	"Domestic Life"	J. D. Martin, Gary Harrison	3:50
2.	"Slow Passin' Time"	Tommy Rocco, Charlie Black, Rory Bourke	4:02
3.	"Love Crazy Love"	Deborah Allen, Rafe Van Hoy	2:45
4.	"American Faces"	Larry Boone, Paul Nelson, Gene Nelson	3:23
5.	"Faded Brown Eyes"	Mike Reid, Naomi Martin	4:38
6.	"Mama's Rockin' Chair"	Tim Mensy, Johnny MacRae	3:24
7.	"It's Not Easy Being Fifteen"	Sonny Curtis	3:33
8.	"I Can Sail to China"	John Grazier	2:45
9.	"Living Like There's No Tomorrow"	Roger Murrah, Jim McBride	3:42
10.	"Right Down to the Memories"	Steve Bogard, Rick Giles	3:36

== Personnel ==
Adapted from liner notes.

- John Conlee – lead vocals, background vocals
- Paul Franklin – steel guitar
- Roger Hawkins – drums
- David Hood – bass guitar
- Jim Horn – horns
- Steve Nathan – keyboards
- Jack Peck – horns
- Don Potter – guitar
- Charlie Rose – horns
- Brent Rowan – guitar
- Harvey Thompson – horns
- Cindy Walker – background vocals
- Dennis Wilson – background vocals

== Chart performance ==
Chart (1987)	Peak position
US Top Country Albums (Billboard)	16
