= Lady Lay Down =

Single by John Conlee

from the album Rose Colored Glasses
- B-side: "Something Special"
- Released: October 1978
- Genre: Country
- Length: 3:05
- Label: ABC
- Songwriters: Don Cook; Rafe Van Hoy
- Producer: Bud Logan

John Conlee singles chronology
"Rose Colored Glasses" (1978)	"Lady Lay Down" (1978)	"Backside of Thirty" (1979)

"Lady Lay Down" is a song written by Rafe Van Hoy and Don Cook, and recorded by American country music artist John Conlee. It was released in October 1978 as the second single from the album Rose Colored Glasses. The song was Conlee's second country hit and his first of seven number ones on the country chart. The single stayed at number one for one week.

== Chart performance ==
=== John Conlee ===
Chart (1978–1979)	Peak position
US Hot Country Songs (Billboard)	1
Canadian RPM Country Tracks	2

=== Year-end charts ===
Chart (1979)	Position
US Hot Country Songs (Billboard)	17

=== Tom Jones ===
In 1981, Tom Jones released a single with the song, that is also featured on his album Darlin'. Jones' cover of the song charted at number 26 on the same chart.

Chart (1981)	Peak position
US Hot Country Songs (Billboard)	26
