= Ricci Mareno =

Country music songwriter

- Born: Joseph Ronald Ricci; June 29, 1938; Philadelphia, Pennsylvania, U.S.
- Died: February 17, 2008 (aged 69)
- Occupation(s): Composer, Producer

Ricci Mareno (born Joseph Ronald Ricci; June 29, 1938 - February 17, 2008) was an American country music songwriter and producer. He produced dozens of albums including 4 number one records. In 1974, SESAC honored Mareno with 17 individual awards, as well as an award for Country Music Writer of the Year and the "International Award".

His compositions were recorded by Eddy Arnold, Waylon Jennings, Connie Smith, Tommy Overstreet, Charlie Rich, and others.
