= In My Eyes (John Conlee album) =

Studio album by John Conlee
- Released: 1983
- Genre: Country music
- Length: 33:20
- Label: MCA
- Producer: Bud Logan

John Conlee chronology
Busted (1982)	In My Eyes (1983)	Blue Highway (1984)

Singles from In My Eyes
- 1. "I'm Only in It for the Love" Released: June 1983; 2. "In My Eyes" Released: October 1983; 3. "As Long as I'm Rockin' with You" Released: February 1984; 4. "Way Back" Released: June 23, 1984

In My Eyes is the sixth studio album by American country music artist John Conlee. It was released in 1983 via MCA Records. The album includes the singles "I'm Only in It for the Love", "In My Eyes", "As Long as I'm Rockin' with You" and "Way Back"

== Track listing ==
No.	Title	Writer(s)	Length
1.	"I'm Only in It for the Love"	Deborah Allen, Kix Brooks, Rafe Van Hoy	3:15
2.	"As Long as I'm Rockin' with You"	Bruce Channel, Kieran Kane	3:21
3.	"Waitin' for the Sun to Shine"	Sonny Throckmorton	3:23
4.	"Together Alone"	Bobby Braddock	3:06
5.	"In My Eyes"	Barbara Wyrick	3:34
6.	"Way Back"	Jerry Fuller	3:13
7.	"Lay Down Sally"	Eric Clapton, Marcy Levy, George Terry	3:08
8.	"New Way Out"	Randy Sharp	3:27
9.	"Don't Count the Rainy Days"	Wayland Holyfield, Jerry Careaga	3:36
10.	"An American Trilogy"	Mickey Newbury	5:43

== Chart performance ==
Chart (1983)	Peak position
US Top Country Albums (Billboard)	9
