= Blue Highway (album) =

Studio album by John Conlee
- Released: 1984
- Genre: Country
- Length: 36:10
- Label: MCA
- Producer: Bud Logan

John Conlee chronology
In My Eyes (1983)	Blue Highway (1984)	Greatest Hits Volume 2 (1985)

Singles from Blue Highway
- 1. "Years After You" Released: October 20, 1984; 2. "Working Man" Released: March 2, 1985; 3. "Blue Highway" Released: July 6, 1985

Blue Highway is the seventh studio album by American country music artist John Conlee. It was released in 1984 via MCA Records. The album inlucdes the singles "Years After You", "Working Man" and "Blue Highway".

== Track listing ==
No.	Title	Writer(s)	Length
1.	"Years After You"	Thom Schuyler	3:28
2.	"Radio Lover"	Ron Hellard, Curly Putman, Bucky Jones	4:12
3.	"De Island"	Bob Simon, Don Henry	3:57
4.	"Blue Highway"	David Womack, Henry	3:19
5.	"Down to Me"	Jerry Fuller, John Hobbs	3:08
6.	"A Little Bit of Lovin'"	Deborah Allen, Rafe Van Hoy	3:49
7.	"Arthur and Alice"	Bobby Braddock	3:57
8.	"Working Man"	Jim Hurt, Billy Ray Reynolds	3:59
9.	"But She Loves Me"	Fuller	3:03
10.	"Is There Anything I Can Do"	Wayland Holyfield, Gary Nicholson	3:54

== Personnel ==
Adapted from liner notes.

- Eddie Bayers – drums
- Dennis Burnside – keyboards
- Jimmy Capps – acoustic guitar
- Terry Choate – steel guitar
- John Conlee – lead vocals
- Mike Haynes – trumpet
- John Barlow Jarvis – synthesizer
- Bud Logan – background vocals
- Connie McCollister – concert master
- Rick McCollister – tambourine, background vocals
- Alan Moore – string arrangements
- Weldon Myrick – steel guitar
- Joe Osborn – bass guitar
- Jay Patten – saxophone
- Brent Rowan – acoustic guitar, electric guitar, ukulele
- Larry Sasser – steel guitar
- The "A" Strings – strings
- Judy Taylor – background vocals
- Dennis Wilson – background vocals

== Chart performance ==
Chart (1984)	Peak position
US Top Country Albums (Billboard)	14
