= Got My Heart Set on You =

Single by John Conlee

from the album Harmony
- B-side: "You've Got a Right"
- Released: May 1986
- Genre: Country
- Length: 3:01
- Label: Columbia
- Songwriter(s): Dobie Gray; Bud Reneau
- Producer(s): Bud Logan

John Conlee singles chronology
"Harmony" (1986)	"Got My Heart Set on You" (1986)	"The Carpenter" (1986)

"Got My Heart Set on You" is a song written by Dobie Gray and Bud Reneau, and recorded by American country music artist John Conlee. It was released in May 1986 as the second single from the album Harmony. The song was Conlee's seventh and final number one country hit. The single went to number one for one week and spent a total of fourteen weeks on the country chart.

== Chart performance ==
Chart (1986)	Peak position
US Hot Country Songs (Billboard)	1
Canadian RPM Country Tracks	1

== Other versions ==
- John Denver was the first to record this song on his 1985 album Dreamland Express.
- Mason Dixon also recorded the song in 1986. Their version peaked at number 72 on the Billboard Hot Country Singles chart in 1986.
