= Busted (John Conlee album) =

Studio album by John Conlee
- Released: 1982
- Genre: Country
- Length: 29:35
- Label: MCA
- Producer: Bud Logan

John Conlee chronology
With Love (1981)	Busted (1982)	In My Eyes (1983)

Singles from Busted
- 1. "Busted" Released: 1982; 2. "Nothing Behind You, Nothing in Sight" Released: 1982; 3. "I Don't Remember Loving You" Released: October 2, 1982; 4. "Common Man" Released: February 1983

Busted is the fifth studio album by American country music artist John Conlee. It was released in 1982 via MCA Records. The album includes the singles "Busted", "Nothing Behind You, Nothing in Sight", "I Don't Remember Loving You" and "Common Man".

== Track listing ==
No.	Title	Writer(s)	Length
1.	"Busted"	Harlan Howard	2:29
2.	"Shame"	Jim McBride	2:58
3.	"Guilty"	Alex Zanetis	3:02
4.	"Two Hearts"	Ron Hellard, Michael Garvin, Budky Jones	2:40
5.	"A Little of You"	Jamie O'Hara	3:04
6.	"Nothing Behind You, Nothing in Sight"	Howard, Ron Peterson	2:55
7.	"Common Man"	Sammy Johns	2:37
8.	"I Don't Remember Loving You"	Howard, Bobby Braddock	3:49
9.	"Ain't No Way to Make a Bad Love Grow"	Sonny Throckmorton	2:44
10.	"A Woman's Touch"	Jerry Fuller	3:18

== Chart performance ==
Chart (1982)	Peak position
US Top Country Albums (Billboard)	21
