= Rose Colored Glasses (album) =

Studio album by John Conlee
- Released: October 11, 1978
- Genre: Country
- Length: 26:03
- Label: ABC
- Producer: Bud Logan

John Conlee chronology
Rose Colored Glasses (1978)	Forever (1979)

Singles from Rose Colored Glasses
- 1. "Rose Colored Glasses" Released: April 25, 1978; 2. "Lady Lay Down" Released: October 1978; 3. "Backside of Thirty" Released: February 1979

Rose Colored Glasses is the debut studio album by American country music artist John Conlee. It was released in 1978 on ABC Records, and was his only disc for the label; he would move to MCA Records the next year.

The album was a commercial success, peaking just outside the country top 10 (at number 11), and would be his highest-charting album until 1983.

It featured three singles on the Billboard Hot Country Songs charts. First was the title track, which reached number five. Both "Lady Lay Down" and "Backside of Thirty" were number one singles on the same chart. "Backside of Thirty" had originally been released in 1977, but it did not chart at the time.

Kurt Wolff and Orla Duane, in their book Country Music: The Rough Guide, described the album's cuts as "among Conlee's finest, including the title track and especially 'Backside of Thirty'."

== Track listing ==
No.	Title	Writer(s)	Length
1.	"Rose Colored Glasses"	John Conlee, George Baber	3:18
2.	"Something Special"	Dave Loggins	2:36
3.	"I'll Be Easy"	Conlee	1:55
4.	"Let Your Love Fall Back on Me"	Jonathan Lee	2:12
5.	"Backside of Thirty"	Conlee	2:33
6.	"Lady Lay Down"	Don Cook, Rafe Van Hoy	3:05
7.	"She Loves My Troubles Away"	Rayburn Anthony, Max D. Barnes	2:28
8.	"Just Let It Slide"	A.L. "Doodle" Owens	2:47
9.	"Some Old California Memory"	Owens, Warren Robb	2:24
10.	"Hold On"	Conlee, Dick Kent	2:45

== Personnel ==
- Guitar: John Conlee, Billy Sanford, Dale Sellers
- Steel Guitar: Buddy Emmons
- Bass: Joe Osborn
- Keyboards: Ron Oates, John Propst
- Drums: Steven Logan, Larrie Londin
- Fiddle: Buddy Spicher
- Strings: Lennie Haight, Sheldon Kurland, Kathryn Plummer, John Propst,
- Backing Vocals: Lea Jane Berinati, Mary Fielder, Janie Fricke, Ginger Holladay
