= Thank God for the Radio =

Single by The Kendalls

from the album Movin' Train
- B-side: "Flaming Eyes"
- Released: January 1984
- Genre: Country
- Label: Mercury
- Songwriter(s): Max D. Barnes; Robert Jones
- Producer(s): Blake Mevis

The Kendalls singles chronology
"Movin' Train" (1983)	"Thank God for the Radio" (1984)	"My Baby's Gone" (1984)

"Thank God for the Radio" is a 1984 single by The Kendalls. "Thank God for the Radio" was The Kendalls' third and last number one country hit. The single went to number one for one week and spent a total of twelve weeks on the country chart.

== Cover versions ==
- The song was covered by Alan Jackson in 1994 for his album, Who I Am

== Charts ==
=== Weekly charts ===
Chart (1984)	Peak position
US Hot Country Songs (Billboard)	1
Canadian RPM Country Tracks	16

=== Year-end charts ===
Chart (1984)	Position
US Hot Country Songs (Billboard)	27
