= Rose Colored Glasses (John Conlee song) =

Single by John Conlee

from the album Rose Colored Glasses
- B-side: "I'll Be Easy"
- Released: April 25, 1978
- Genre: Country
- Length: 3:24
- Label: ABC #12356
- Songwriter(s): John Conlee; George Baber
- Producer(s): Bud Logan

John Conlee singles chronology
"The In Crowd" (1977)	"Rose Colored Glasses" (1978)	"Lady Lay Down" (1978)

"Rose Colored Glasses" is a song co-written and recorded by American country music singer John Conlee. It was released in April 1978 as the first single and title track from his debut album Rose Colored Glasses. The song peaked at number 5 in the United States and number 6 in Canada. Conlee wrote the song with George Baber.

== Content ==
The songs references the expression "rose-colored glasses," with the male narrator "deluding himself about the woman he loves."

== Critical reception ==
Kurt Wolff and Orla Duane, in Country Music: The Rough Guide, described the song as "a surprise hit that defined him as a traditionalist[…]and put him more in league with modern-day honky-tonkers Gene Watson and Moe Bandy[.]" The song was the most commercially successful single for the ABC Records label in 1978.

== Chart performance ==
"Rose Colored Glasses" was Conlee's fourth release on the ABC label, but his first to enter a singles chart. The song spent twenty weeks on the Hot Country Singles (now Hot Country Songs) charts, peaking at number 5 there. It also peaked at number 6 on the Canadian country music charts published by RPM.

Chart (1978)	Peak position
US Hot Country Songs (Billboard)	5
Canadian RPM Country Tracks	6
