= I'm Only in It for the Love =

Single by John Conlee

from the album In My Eyes
- B-side: "Lay Down Sally"
- Released: June 1983
- Genre: Country
- Length: 3:18
- Label: MCA
- Songwriter(s): Kix Brooks; Deborah Allen; Rafe Van Hoy
- Producer(s): Bud Logan

John Conlee singles chronology
"Common Man" (1983)	"I'm Only in It for the Love" (1983)	"In My Eyes" (1983)

"I'm Only in It for the Love" is a song written by Kix Brooks, Deborah Allen and Rafe Van Hoy, and recorded by American country music artist John Conlee. It was released in June 1983 as the first single from the album In My Eyes. The song was Conlee's fourth number one on the country chart. The single went to number one for one week and spent a total of twelve weeks on the country chart.

== Charts ==
=== Weekly charts ===
Chart (1983)	Peak position
US Hot Country Songs (Billboard)	1
Canadian RPM Country Tracks	2

=== Year-end charts ===
Chart (1983)	Position
US Hot Country Songs (Billboard)	8
