= As Long as I'm Rockin' with You =

Single by John Conlee

from the album In My Eyes
- B-side: "American Trilogy"
- Released: February 1984
- Genre: Country
- Length: 3:24
- Label: MCA
- Songwriter(s): Bruce Channel; Kieran Kane
- Producer(s): Bud Logan

John Conlee singles chronology
"In My Eyes" (1983)	"As Long as I'm Rockin' with You" (1984)	"Way Back" (1984)

"As Long as I'm Rockin' with You" is a song written by Bruce Channel and Kieran Kane, and recorded by American country music artist John Conlee. It was released in February 1984 as the third single from the album In My Eyes. The song was Conlee's sixth number one on the country chart. The single went to number one for one week and spent twelve weeks on the country chart.

== Charts ==
=== Weekly charts ===
Chart (1984)	Peak position
US Hot Country Songs (Billboard)	1
Canadian RPM Country Tracks	1

=== Year-end charts ===
Chart (1984)	Position
US Hot Country Songs (Billboard)	34
