= Forever (John Conlee album) =

Studio album by John Conlee
- Released: 1979
- Recorded: 1979
- Genre: Country
- Label: MCA Records
- Producer: Bud Logan

John Conlee chronology
Rose Colored Glasses (1978)	Forever (1979)	Friday Night Blues (1980)

Singles from Forever
- 1. "The In Crowd" Released: 1977; 2. "Before My Time" Released: August 11, 1979; 3. "Baby, You're Something" Released: December 15, 1979

Forever is the second studio album by American country music singer John Conlee. It was released in 1979 by MCA Records.

== Track listing ==
No.	Title	Writer(s)	Length
1.	"Before My Time"	Ben Peters	2:39
2.	"Let's Keep It That Way"	Curly Putman, Rafe Van Hoy	3:40
3.	"Forever"	Van Hoy	3:03
4.	"You Never Cross My Mind"	Deborah Allen, Putman, Van Hoy	2:46
5.	"I Wish That I Could Hurt That Way Again"	Putman, Van Hoy, Don Cook	2:58
6.	"Baby, You're Something"	Putman, Van Hoy, Cook	2:57
7.	"No Relief In Sight"	Gene Dobbins, Johnny Wilson, Rory Bourke	2:36
8.	"The In Crowd"	Fred Lehner, Jerry McBee	2:46
9.	"Crazy"	Willie Nelson	2:55
10.	"Somebody's Leavin'"	Putman, Van Hoy, Cook	2:38

== Personnel ==
- Guitar: Mark Casstevens, John Conlee, Steve Logan. Dale Sellers, Rafe VanHoy. Steel Guitar: Buddy Emmons
- Bass: Joe Osborn
- Keyboards: Dennis Burnside, Don Cook, Ron Oates
- Drums: Eddie Bayers, Larrie Londin
- Woodwinds: Sam Levine, Jay Patten, Joe Pellecchia
- Fiddle: Buddy Spicher
- Strings: Carl Gorodetzky, Sheldon Kurland, Kathryn Plummer, Donald Teal, George Binkley, Lennie Haight,
  Martha McCrory, Marvin Chantry, Ray Christensen, Steve Smith, Wilfred Lehman, Gary Vanosdale
- Backing Vocals – Duane West, Ginger Holladay, Janie Fricke, Lea Jane Berinati, Rickie Page

== Charts ==
Chart (1979)	Peak position
US Top Country Albums (Billboard)	20
