= Blue Highway (song) =

Single by John Conlee

from the album Blue Highway
- B-side: "De Island"
- Released: July 6, 1985
- Genre: Country
- Length: 3:16
- Label: MCA
- Songwriter(s): David Womack, Don Henry
- Producer(s): Bud Logan

John Conlee singles chronology
"Working Man" (1985)	"Blue Highway" (1985)	"Old School" (1985)

"Blue Highway" is a song written by David Womack and Don Henry, and recorded by American country music artist John Conlee. It was released in July 1985 as the third single and title track from the album Blue Highway. The song reached #15 on the Billboard Hot Country Singles & Tracks chart.

== Chart performance ==
Chart (1985)	Peak position
US Hot Country Songs (Billboard)	15
Canadian RPM Country Tracks	13
