= Harmony (John Conlee album) =

Studio album by John Conlee
- Released: 1986
- Genre: Country
- Length: 33:20
- Label: Columbia
- Producer: Bud Logan

John Conlee chronology
Greatest Hits Volume 2 (1985)	Harmony (1986)	American Faces (1987)

Singles from Harmony
- 1. "Harmony" Released: February 22, 1986; 2. "Got My Heart Set on You" Released: May 1986; 3. "The Carpenter" Released: September 1986

Harmony is a studio album by American country music artist John Conlee, released in 1986 via Columbia Records. The album includes the singles "Harmony", "Got My Heart Set on You" and "The Carpenter". Harmony stayed on the country charts for more than a year.

== Critical reception ==
UPI wrote that "Conlee's smooth baritone delivery and excellent choice of material make this LP another winner." The Richmond Times-Dispatch opined that "Conlee's voice has a hard-core country quality almost as impressive as that of Merle Haggard."

== Track listing ==
No.	Title	Writer(s)	Length
1.	"Harmony"	Jimbeau Hinson, Rick Ellsworth	3:22
2.	"Got My Heart Set on You"	Dobie Gray, Bud Reneau	3:05
3.	"Class Reunion"	Craig Morris, Don Henry	3:59
4.	"She Told Me So"	Bobby Braddock	2:56
5.	"I'll Be Seeing You"	Walt Aldridge, Tom Brasfield	2:48
6.	"For a Little While"	Jerry Fuller, John Hobbs, Joe Chemay	3:13
7.	"Cars"	Dickey Lee, Bob McDill	3:59
8.	"You've Got a Right"	Bruce Channel, Kieran Kane	3:14
9.	"The Carpenter"	Guy Clark	3:13
10.	"The Day He Turned Sixty-Five"	Jamie O'Hara	3:31

== Personnel ==
Adapted from liner notes.

- Eddie Bayers - drums
- Dennis Burnside - keyboards
- Mark Casstevens - acoustic guitar
- John Conlee - lead vocals, background vocals
- Hoot Hester - fiddle
- Randy McCormick - keyboards
- Joe Osborn - bass guitar
- Lloyd Green - steel guitar
- Brent Rowan - electric guitar
- Larry Sasser - steel guitar
- Wendy Suits - background vocals
- Judy Taylor - background vocals
- Dennis Wilson - background vocals

== Chart performance ==
Chart (1986)	Peak position
US Top Country Albums (Billboard)	9
