= Friday Night Blues (album) =

Studio album by John Conlee
- Released: 1980
- Recorded: 1980
- Genre: Country
- Length: 29:31
- Label: MCA Records
- Producer: Bud Logan

John Conlee chronology
Forever (1979)	Friday Night Blues (1980)	With Love (1981)

Singles from Friday Night Blues
- 1. "Friday Night Blues" Released: May 3, 1980; 2. "She Can't Say That Anymore" Released: September 13, 1980; 3. "What I Had with You" Released: January 24, 1981

Friday Night Blues is the third studio album by American country music singer John Conlee. The album was released in 1980, by MCA Records.

== Track listing ==
No.	Title	Writer(s)	Length
1.	"Friday Night Blues"	Sonny Throckmorton, Rafe Van Hoy	3:19
2.	"Honky Tonk Toys"	A.L. "Doodle" Owens, Judy Vowell	3:11
3.	"She Can't Say That Anymore"	Throckmorton	2:39
4.	"Old Fashioned Love"	Jamie O'Hara, Don Cook	2:45
5.	"Misery Loves Company"	Jerry Reed	3:47
6.	"Let's Get Married Again"	Jerry Gillespie, Charlie Black, Rory Bourke	2:39
7.	"When I'm Out of You"	Sanger D. Shafer, Throckmorton	2:26
8.	"We Belong in Love Tonight"	Mark Paden	2:48
9.	"Always True"	Dave Loggins	3:00
10.	"What I Had with You"	Throckmorton, Curly Putman	2:57
Total length:			29:31

== Charts ==
Chart (1980)	Peak position
US Top Country Albums (Billboard)	16
