= Working Man (John Conlee song) =

Single by John Conlee

from the album Blue Highway
- B-side: "Radio Lover"
- Released: March 2, 1985
- Genre: Country
- Length: 3:53
- Label: MCA
- Songwriter(s): Jim Hurt, Billy Ray Reynolds
- Producer(s): Bud Logan

John Conlee singles chronology
"Years After You" (1984)	"Working Man" (1985)	"Blue Highway" (1985)

"Working Man" is a song written by Jim Hurt and Billy Ray Reynolds, and recorded by American country music artist John Conlee. It was released in March 1985 as the second single from album Blue Highway. The song reached #7 on the Billboard Hot Country Singles & Tracks chart.

== Chart performance ==
Chart (1985)	Peak position
US Hot Country Songs (Billboard)	7
Canadian RPM Country Tracks	6
