= I'm Not the Devil =

Studio album by Cody Jinks
- Released: August 12, 2016
- Genre: Country
- Label: Cody Jinks Music

Cody Jinks chronology
Adobe Sessions (2015)	I'm Not the Devil (2016)	Lifers (2018)

I'm Not the Devil is the seventh studio album from American country music artist Cody Jinks. It was released on August 12, 2016 through Cody Jinks Music.

== Commercial performance ==
The album debuted at No. 4 on the Top Country Albums chart with 11,000 sold, and it is the first album by Jinks to appear on the chart. It has sold 67,100 copies in the United States as of December 2017.

== Track listing ==
All songs written by Cody Jinks except where noted.

1. "The Same" (Chris Claridy, Cody Jinks) - 3:36
2. "I'm Not the Devil" - 3:35
3. "No Guarantees" - 3:50
4. "No Words" - 3:37
5. "Give All You Can" - 5:06
6. "She's All Mine" - 3:31
7. "The Way I Am" (Sonny Throckmorton) - 3:00
8. "Chase That Song" - 3:17
9. "Heavy Load" - 4:12
10. "Grey" (Cody Jinks, Tom McElvain) - 3:17
11. "Church at Gaylor Creek" (Billy Don Burns) - 4:17
12. "Vampires" (Cody Jinks, Meredith Evelyn Jinks) - 4:18
13. "Hand Me Down" - 4:18

== Chart positions ==
=== Weekly charts ===
Chart (2016)	Peak position
US Billboard 200	39
US Top Country Albums (Billboard)	4
US Independent Albums (Billboard)	3

=== Year-end charts ===
Chart (2016)	Position
US Top Country Albums (Billboard)	73
