= In My Eyes (Conway Twitty song) =

Single by John Conlee

from the album In My Eyes
- B-side: "Don't Count the Rainy Days"
- Released: October 1983
- Genre: Country
- Length: 3:40
- Label: MCA
- Songwriter(s): Barbara Wyrick
- Producer(s): Bud Logan

John Conlee singles chronology
"I'm Only in It for the Love" (1983)	"In My Eyes" (1983)	"As Long as I'm Rockin' with You" (1984)

"In My Eyes" is a song written by Barbara Wyrick, and originally recorded by Conway Twitty on his 1982 album Dream Maker. It was released by American country music artist John Conlee in October 1983 as the second single and title track from his album In My Eyes. The song was Conlee's fifth number one on the country chart. The single went to number one for one week and spent a total of fifteen weeks on the country chart.

== Charts ==
=== Weekly charts ===
Chart (1983–1984)	Peak position
US Hot Country Songs (Billboard)	1
Canadian RPM Country Tracks	2

=== Year-end charts ===
Chart (1984)	Position
US Hot Country Songs (Billboard)	23
