= Backside of Thirty =

Single by John Conlee

from the album Rose Colored Glasses
- B-side: "Hold On"
- Released: February 1979
- Genre: Country
- Length: 2:33
- Label: ABC
- Songwriter(s): John Conlee
- Producer(s): Bud Logan

John Conlee singles chronology
"Lady Lay Down" (1978)	"Backside of Thirty" (1979)	"Before My Time" (1979)

"Backside of Thirty" is a song written and recorded by American country music artist John Conlee. It was released in February 1979 as the third single from the album Rose Colored Glasses. The song was Conlee's third country hit and second number one on the country chart. The single stayed at number one for a single week and spent a total of fifteen weeks on the country chart. The song was originally recorded by Joe Stampley on his 1976 album, Ten Songs About Her.

== Content ==
The song is about a 35-year-old working man whose aspirations of family life and the American dream come undone after a particularly acrimonious divorce. With his ex-wife and young son having left him, the man bemoans his brokeness, despair and solace in the bottle. When friends ask him about how things are going, he puts up his bravado, saying things are fine, although he admits "my eyes tell a story that my lies can't hide."

== Charts ==
=== Weekly charts ===
Chart (1979)	Peak position
US Hot Country Songs (Billboard)	1
Canadian RPM Country Tracks	5

=== Year-end charts ===
Chart (1979)	Position
US Hot Country Songs (Billboard)	16
