= Ovation Records =

American record label

- Founded: 1969
- Founder: Dick Schory
- Genre: Country, Rock, Pop, Jazz
- Country of origin: U.S.
- Location: Glenview, Illinois

Ovation Records was an American independent record label based in Glenview, Illinois. The label was founded in 1969 by Dick Schory, who had been on RCA Records with his Percussion Pops Orchestra and had helped create the Dynagroove process used by RCA.

The label was created to feature many different genres; the mid-1970s success of The Kendalls gave Ovation an image as a country music label, although it continued to record rock and pop.

In the early to mid 1970s most Ovation LPs were released in a 4-channel matrix quadraphonic format, which was also compatible with conventional 2-channel stereo playback systems. The label initially used the EV or Stereo-4 matrix but later changed to QS Regular Matrix.

The Ovation Records product was acquired by global rights management company 43 North Broadway, LLC.

== Artists ==
- Sheila Andrews
- Band of Thieves
- Max D. Barnes
- Citizen
- Sonny Curtis (1970 to 1972)
- Steve Dahl and Teenage Radiation
- Okie Duke
- Cleveland Eaton
- Family Brown
- Mark Gaddis
- Vern Gosdin
- Heaven & Earth
- Hollins & Starr
- Johnson & Drake
- The Kendalls
- Bonnie Koloc
- Harvey Mandel
- Joe Morello
- Possum River
- Rich Mountain Tower
- Joe Sun
- Tantrum
- Robbin Thompson
