= Red Lane =

American country music singer-songwriter (1939–2015)

- Red Lane Album, early 1970s

Background information
- Born: Hollis Rudolph DeLaughter; February 9, 1939; Zona, Louisiana, now Bogalusa, U.S.
- Origin: Omaha, Nebraska, United States
- Died: July 1, 2015 (aged 76) Nashville, Tennessee, U.S.
- Genres: Country
- Occupation(s): Singer, songwriter
- Instrument(s): Vocals, guitar
- Years active: 1965–2010
- Labels: RCA Victor
- Formerly of: Merle Haggard, Dottie West, The Strangers

Red Lane (born Hollis Rudolph DeLaughter; surname pronounced Dee-LAW-ter; February 9, 1939 – July 1, 2015) was an American country music singer, songwriter and guitarist who was a member of the Nashville Songwriters Hall of Fame (1993). A self-taught musician, Lane began writing songs in the early 1960s and over his career wrote or co-wrote 60 songs that reached the U.S. top 100 country charts. Outside of country music, Lane's songs have been recorded by a diverse group of artists including Bob Dylan, Ray Charles and Solomon Burke. He has credits as composer or instrumentalist on at least 386 albums.

His most widely-known songs include, "'Til I Get It Right" (recorded by Tammy Wynette, 1973), "Country Girl" (Dottie West), "Miss Emily's Picture" (John Conlee), "The Eagle" (Waylon Jennings, George Strait), "My Own Kind of Hat" (Merle Haggard, Alan Jackson), "Blackjack County Chain" (Willie Nelson, Waylon Jennings), "Tell Me Something Bad About Tulsa" (George Strait), and "New Looks From An Old Lover" (B.J. Thomas).

Lane's songs were recorded by many country artists, including Merle Haggard, Willie Nelson, Waylon Jennings, Tammy Wynette, Eddy Arnold, Dottie West, B.J. Thomas, George Strait, Roger Miller and Alan Jackson. In 2010 he was recognized by the Country Music Hall of Fame in a program series called "Poets and Prophets", which included a two-hour interview session with Lane, and live performance by him enhanced with photos, videos and recordings from the Museum's Frist Library and Archive. The program was streamed live by the Hall of Fame.

== Early life ==
He was born in Zona, Louisiana which was later incorporated into the town of Bogalusa, along the Pearl River which forms the lower part of the boundary between Louisiana and Mississippi. His father was a sharecropper and heavy equipment operator. The family moved often to go wherever there was work. He began playing guitar about age nine, taught by his father. The family moved to northern Indiana, where he completed high school. He then joined the Air Force and was stationed in Hawaii as an aircraft mechanic. His color blindness prevented him though from being a pilot. His guitar playing served him well in the Air Force, where he won a talent contest and performed on a popular live radio show called Hawaii Calls broadcast from Waikiki Beach. In 1958 he was transferred to another base in Omaha, Nebraska where he played guitar in nightclubs six nights a week. His nickname was "Red". He began using the name "Red Lane" at this time to avoid problems with his superiors at the Air Force base, and the name stuck. After military discharge, he played guitar across the U.S. in several states but had to do farm labor to make ends meet. At one time, he lived under a bridge in Phoenix, Arizona when he couldn't afford rent.

In the early '60s, he took up songwriting, being inspired by the writing of Willie Nelson. He became acquainted with Justin Tubb, son of country star Ernest Tubb, who hired Lane to play in his band and arranged getting some of Lane's songs to Nashville's Buddy Killen, of Tree International Publishing. Killen facilitated Lane's move to Nashville and signed him as a staff writer in April 1964. Just over a week after moving to Nashville, Lane appeared on the Grand Ole Opry with Tubb. Lane said, "What do you do after you've reached all your dreams in 8 days?" A year later, Lane won a BMI songwriting award with the hit song "My Friend on the Right" recorded by Faron Young. Today, at the Sony/ATV building writers' quarters where young songwriters sketch out songs, Red Lane's portrait now hangs.

== Career ==
Lane's career as a solo singer was mediocre. He was offered a recording contract by Chet Atkins and had a No. 32 country hit with "The World Needs a Melody" which was released on RCA in the 1970s. He appeared on ABC's The Johnny Cash Show and had some other successes, but decided that he preferred a songwriter's lifestyle rather than that of a performer. His career thus launched, he achieved success writing and performing many country records.

Lane's music has been recorded by many non-country artists including Elvis Costello, Ray Charles, Engelbert Humperdinck, Solomon Burke and Bob Dylan. In Nashville, he was hired by Dottie West as a guitarist and MC in her band, called "The Heartaches". Lane developed a productive association with West, who recorded dozens of his songs. He was a guitarist for Merle Haggard and The Strangers, who recorded about 25 of Lane's songs.

== Unique character ==
Lane had been interested in airplanes since his early career as an aircraft mechanic. He eventually got his pilot's license, and also became a skydiver. He used this experience in a song "The Day I Jumped from Uncle Harvey's Plane" recorded by Roger Miller. He found a 1958 DC-8 passenger jetliner at the Smyrna, Tennessee airport, one of the few places where this particular type of plane could be repaired. He purchased the plane and had it cut into five pieces, which were shipped on flat bed trucks to his home in Ashland City, Tennessee (near Nashville). Its 177 seats were removed, and it was converted into Lane's permanent home. It was well insulated and comfortable, and had a bar and a music room in the cockpit. It served as a place where songwriters and musicians would frequently gather to share songs and ideas. Lane's directions on how to find him went something like: "...go down the country road past the bicycle and the windsock, and it's the first large airliner on the right." Lane was active in charitable efforts with the local police department with a camp for disadvantaged youth. He once took the boys out for a boat ride on Nashville's Old Hickory Lake and surprised them by pulling the boat up to Johnny Cash's house. Cash came out personally and gave the boys record albums. Lane was a veteran guest of the "red light pickin' parties" hosted by Texas football coach Darrell Royal, who was an aficionado of country music and especially songwriters.

Lane died of cancer in Nashville on July 1, 2015. He was 76.
