= John Conlee =

American country music singer (born 1946)

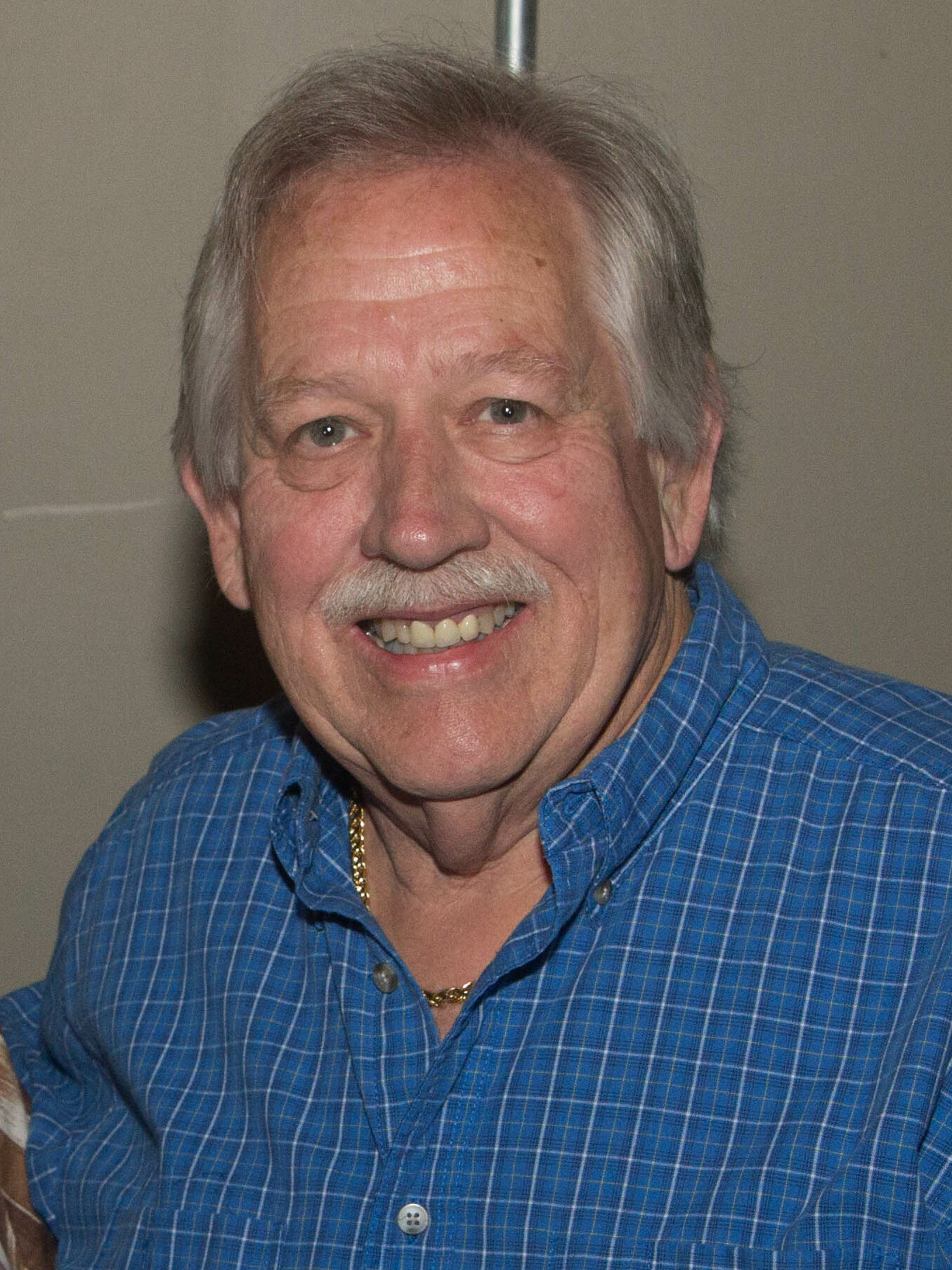
- Conlee in 2017

Background information
- Born: John Wayne Conlee; August 11, 1946 (age 80); Versailles, Kentucky, U. S.
- Genres: Country
- Occupation: Singer
- Instrument: Vocals
- Years active: 1956–present
- Labels: ABC, MCA Nashville, Columbia, 16th Avenue
- Website: www.johnconlee.com

John Wayne Conlee (born August 11, 1946) is an American country music singer.

Between 1978 and 2004, Conlee charted a total of 32 singles on the Billboard Hot Country Songs charts, and recorded 11 studio albums. His singles include seven number-one hits: "Lady Lay Down", "Backside of Thirty", "Common Man", "I'm Only in It for the Love", "In My Eyes", "As Long as I'm Rockin' with You", and "Got My Heart Set on You". In addition to these, Conlee had 14 other songs reach the top 10.

Conlee has been a member of the Grand Ole Opry since 1981.

== Early life ==
Conlee was born on a tobacco farm in Versailles, Kentucky. By age 10, Conlee had begun singing and playing guitar, and later sang tenor in a barbershop quartet.

Conlee did not immediately take up a musical career, instead becoming a licensed mortician, employed by Duell-Clark Funeral Chapel, and later a disc jockey at radio stations WQXE in Elizabethtown, Kentucky, and at WLAC in Nashville.

== Music career ==
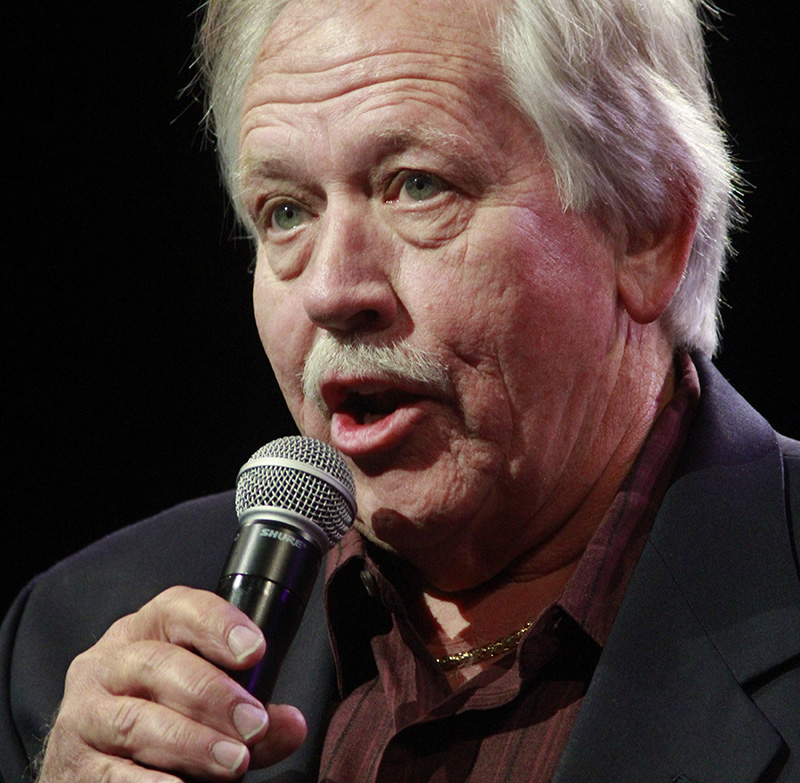
Conlee singing on the Grand Ole Opry on Saturday, October 31, 2015, in Nashville, Tennessee

In pursuit of a music career, Conlee moved to Nashville, Tennessee, by 1971. He signed to ABC Records in 1976. Conlee charted for the first time in 1978 with "Rose Colored Glasses", a number-five hit on the Billboard Hot Country Singles chart, as well as the title track on his 1978 debut album. The album produced his first two number-one hits with "Lady Lay Down" and "Backside of Thirty".

Following ABC's merger with MCA Records, Conlee released his 1979 album Forever on MCA. Its singles, "Before My Time" (number two) and "Baby, You're Something" (number seven), were top-10 hits. A second MCA release, Friday Night Blues, produced two more number-two hits - the title track and "She Can't Say that Anymore". The song "What I Had with You" (number 12) followed. The 1981 album, With Love, accounted for yet another hit with "Miss Emily's Picture" (number two), which Conlee performed live on Hee Haw on January 3, 1981.

Conlee's 1982 album Busted led off with a cover of the Harlan Howard song of the same name. The album's last single, "Common Man", returned him to the top of the charts in 1983. Three more number-one hits came from the 1983 album In My Eyes: "I'm Only in It for the Love" (co-written with Kix Brooks), the title track, and "As Long as I'm Rockin' with You". MCA also released a Greatest Hits album in 1983.

Blue Highway in 1984, his last studio album for MCA, produced another number two with "Years After You". A year later, a second Greatest Hits album produced his last MCA single with the number-five "Old School", before he moved to Columbia Records. Conlee's first Columbia release, Harmony, gave him his last number-one hit with "Got My Heart Set on You" in 1986. A second and final album for Columbia, American Faces, reached the top 10 for the last time with "Domestic Life". This was followed by "Mama's Rockin' Chair" at number 11 (his last top-40 hit). From there, Conlee moved to 16th Avenue Records, releasing Fellow Travelers in 1989.

In 2005, Conlee donated his concert performance of "Rose Colored Glasses" at the Wildhorse Saloon in Nashville, to benefit the Lymphatic Research Foundation in New York. Conlee sang his signature song and auctioned off a pair of "rose-colored glasses" with the proceeds going to the foundation.

Conlee has appeared on Larry's Country Diner and Wednesday Night Prayer Meeting (released on DVD/CD) via RFD-TV and Country Road TV.

== Discography ==
Studio albums

- Rose Colored Glasses (1978)
- Forever (1979)
- Friday Night Blues (1980)
- With Love (1981)
- Busted (1982)
- In My Eyes (1983)
- Blue Highway (1984)
- Harmony (1986)
- American Faces (1987)
- Fellow Travelers (1989)
- Turn Your Eyes Upon Jesus (2004)

== Awards and nominations ==
=== Academy of Country Music Awards ===
Year	Nominee / work	Award	Result
1979	John Conlee	Top New Male Vocalist	Won

=== Country Music Association Awards ===
Year	Nominee / work	Award	Result
1979	Rose Colored Glasses	Album of the Year	Nominated
1979	John Conlee	Male Vocalist of the Year	Nominated
1980	John Conlee	Male Vocalist of the Year	Nominated
