= Dottie West singles discography =

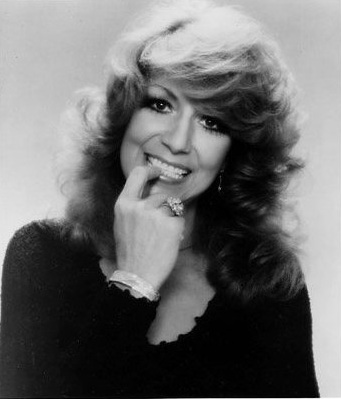
- Singles as a solo artist: 59
- Singles as a collaborative artist: 12
- Promotional singles: 3
- Other charted songs: 1

The singles discography of American country artist Dottie West contains 59 singles released as a solo artist, 12 singles released as a collaborative artist, 3 promotional singles and 1 other charting song. West signed with RCA Victor Records in 1963, having her first Top 40 hit the same year. It was followed in 1964 by "Love Is No Excuse", a duet with Jim Reeves that became West's first top 10 hit. In 1964, she also released "Here Comes My Baby". The song reached number 10 on the Billboard Hot Country Singles chart and became the first song by a female country artist to win a Grammy Award. From her 1966 album, West issued four singles, including the top 10 hits "Would You Hold It Against Me" and "What's Come Over My Baby". Over the next two years she had major hits with "Paper Mansions", "Like a Fool", "Country Girl", and "Reno". In 1969, West collaborated with Don Gibson on "Rings of Gold", which reached number 2 on the Billboard country chart. In 1973, she released a single version of a commercial jingle originally used by The Coca-Cola Company. Entitled "Country Sunshine", the song became West's biggest hit, reaching number 2 on the country songs chart and number 49 on the Billboard Hot 100. The song also nominated her for her eleventh Grammy. After releasing the top 10 hit "Last Time I Saw Him" (1974), West's chart hits declined and she was dropped from RCA in 1976.

Switching to United Artists Records, West's first single "When It's Just You and Me" became a top 20 country hit. In 1978 she paired with Kenny Rogers on "Every Time Two Fools Collide". The song became her first number one single on the Billboard country chart. Their success revitalized West's career and won the pair the Country Music Association's Vocal Duo of the Year award in 1978 and 1979. During the late 1970s, the pair had 3 more top 10 hits with "Anyone Who Isn't Me Tonight", "All I Ever Need Is You", and "'Til I Can Make It on My Own". Their 1981 single, "What Are We Doin' in Love", went to number one and became a top 15 crossover hit on the Billboard Hot 100. West's 1979 album included her 1980 single "A Lesson in Leavin'". The song became West's first number one solo hit on the Billboard country chart. The album's additional singles ("You Pick Me Up and Put Me Down" and "Leavin's for Unbelievers") became top twenty country hits that year. The lead single off her 1981 album called "Are You Happy Baby" would also reach the top spot of the Billboard country songs list. After a top twenty hit with "It's High Time" (1982) and a successful duet with Kenny Rogers (1984), West's singles began peaking outside the Billboard country top 40. Her 1985 single "We Know Better Now" became her final chart appearance, peaking at number 53 on the Hot Country Singles & Tracks chart.

== Singles as lead artist ==
=== 1960s ===
List of singles, with selected chart positions and other relevant details
Title	Year	Peak chart positions		Album
Title	Year	US Cou.	CAN Cou.	Album
"Angel on Paper"	1960	—	—	—N/a
"I Should Start Running"	1961	—	—	—N/a
"My Big John"	1961	—	—	—N/a
"You Said I'd Never Love Again"	1962	—	—	—N/a
"Touch Me"	1963	—	—	Here Comes My Baby
"Let Me off at the Corner"	1963	29	—	—N/a
"Here Comes My Baby"	1964	10	—	Here Comes My Baby
"Didn't I"	1964	32	—	Here Comes My Baby
"Gettin' Married Has Made Us Strangers"	1965	30	—	Dottie West Sings
"No Sign of Living"	1965	32	—	Dottie West Sings
"Before the Ring on Your Finger Turns Green"	1965	22	—	Suffer Time
"Would You Hold It Against Me"	1966	5	—	Suffer Time
"Mommy, Can I Still Call Him Daddy"	1966	24	—	Suffer Time
"What's Come Over My Baby"	1966	17	—	Suffer Time
"Paper Mansions"	1967	8	—	With All My Heart and Soul
"Like a Fool"	1967	13	—	I'll Help You Forget Her
"Childhood Places"	1967	24	—	—N/a
"Country Girl"	1968	15	5	Country Girl
"Reno"	1968	19	6	—N/a
"Clingin' to My Baby's Hand"	1969	47	—	Makin' Memories
"—" denotes a recording that did not chart or was not released in that territory.

=== 1970s ===
List of singles, with selected chart positions and other relevant details
Title	Year	Peak chart positions						Album
Title	Year	US	US AC	US Cou.	CAN	CAN AC	CAN Cou.	Album
"I Heard Our Song"	1970	—	—	45	—	—	—	Makin' Memories
"Long Black Limousine"	1970	—	—	—	—	—	—	Makin' Memories
"It's Dawned on Me You're Gone"	1970	—	—	37	—	—	—	Country and West
"Forever Yours	1970	—	—	21	—	—	—	Forever Yours
"Careless Hands"	1971	—	—	48	—	—	—	Careless Hands
"Lonely Is"	1971	—	—	53	—	—	—	I'm Only a Woman
"Six Weeks Every Summer (Christmas Every Other Year)"	1971	—	—	51	—	—	—	Have You Heard...Dottie West
"You're the Other Half of Me"	1971	—	—	—	—	—	—	Have You Heard...Dottie West
"I'm Only a Woman"	1972	—	—	52	—	—	—	I'm Only a Woman
"If It's All Right with You"	1972	97	—	28	—	—	48	If It's All Right with You/ Just What I've Been Looking For
"Just What I've Been Looking For"	1973	—	—	44	—	—	—	If It's All Right with You/ Just What I've Been Looking For
"Country Sunshine"	1973	49	37	2	68	42	9	Country Sunshine
"Last Time I Saw Him"	1974	—	—	8	—	—	—	House of Love
"House of Love"	1974	—	—	21	—	—	—	House of Love
"Lay Back Lover"	1974	—	—	35	—	—	—	House of Love
"Rollin' in Your Sweet Sunshine"	1975	—	—	65	—	—	—	Carolina Cousins
"Here Comes the Flowers"	1976	—	—	68	—	—	—	—N/a
"If I'm a Fool for Lovin' You"	1976	—	—	91	—	—	—	—N/a
"When It's Just You and Me"	1976	—	—	19	—	—	12	When It's Just You and Me
"Every Word I Write"	1977	—	—	28	—	—	33	When It's Just You and Me
"Tonight You Belong to Me"	1977	—	—	30	—	—	42	When It's Just You and Me
"That's All I Wanted to Know"	1977	—	—	57	—	—	—	When It's Just You and Me
"Come See Me and Come Lonely"	1978	—	—	17	—	—	28	Dottie
"Reaching Out to Hold You"	1978	—	—	49	—	—	56	—N/a
"You Pick Me Up (And Put Me Down)"	1979	—	50	12	—	—	28	Special Delivery
"—" denotes a recording that did not chart or was not released in that territory.

=== 1980s ===
List of singles, with selected chart positions and other relevant details
Title	Year	Peak chart positions					Album
Title	Year	US	US AC	US Cou.	CAN AC	CAN Cou.	Album
"A Lesson in Leavin'"	1980	73	42	1	—	23	Special Delivery
"Leavin's for Unbelievers"	1980	—	—	13	—	—	Special Delivery
"Are You Happy Baby?"	1980	—	—	1	—	—	Wild West
"What Are We Doin' in Love" (with Kenny Rogers)	1981	14	7	1	9	3	Wild West
"(I'm Gonna) Put You Back on the Rack"	1981	—	—	16	—	22	Wild West
"It's High Time"	1981	—	—	16	—	31	High Times
"You're Not Easy to Forget"	1982	—	—	26	—	—	High Times
"She Can't Get My Love Off the Bed"	1982	—	—	29	—	—	Full Circle
"If It Takes All Night"	1982	—	—	63	—	—	Full Circle
"Tulsa Ballroom"	1983	—	—	40	—	—	New Horizons
"Night Love Let You Down"	1983	—	—	—	—	—	New Horizons
"What's Good for the Goose"	1984	—	—	77	—	—	Just Dottie
"Let Love Come Lookin' for You"	1984	—	—	67	—	—	Just Dottie
"We Know Better Now"	1985	—	—	53	—	—	Just Dottie
"—" denotes a recording that did not chart or was not released in that territory.

== Singles as a collaborative artist ==
List of singles, with selected chart positions and other relevant details
Title	Year	Peak chart positions						Album
Title	Year	US Bub.	US AC	US Cou.	CAN AC	CAN Cou.	NZ	Album
"Love Is No Excuse" (with Jim Reeves)	1964	15	—	7	—	—	—	—N/a
"Chet's Tune" (credited as Some of Chet's Friends)	1967	—	—	38	—	—	—	—N/a
"Rings of Gold" (with Don Gibson)	1969	—	—	2	—	1	—	Dottie and Don
"Sweet Memories" (with Don Gibson)	1969	—	—	32	—	—	—	Dottie and Don
"There's a Story (Goin' 'Round)" (with Don Gibson)	1969	—	—	7	—	—	—	—N/a
"Till I Can't Take It Anymore" (with Don Gibson)	1970	—	—	46	—	—	—	Dottie & Don
"Slowly" (with Jimmy Dean)	1971	—	—	29	—	—	—	Country Boy and Country Girl
"Every Time Two Fools Collide" (with Kenny Rogers)	1978	1	44	1	12	1	—	Every Time Two Fools Collide
"Anyone Who Isn't Me Tonight" (with Kenny Rogers)	1978	—	—	2	—	10	—	Every Time Two Fools Collide
"All I Ever Need Is You" (with Kenny Rogers)	1979	15	38	1	—	2	37	Classics
"'Til I Can Make It on My Own" (with Kenny Rogers)	1979	—	—	3	—	1	—	Classics
"Together Again" (with Kenny Rogers)	1984	—	—	19	—	29	—	Duets
"—" denotes a recording that did not chart or was not released in that territory.

== Promotional singles ==
List of singles, with selected chart positions and other relevant details
Title	Year	Peak chart positions	Album
Title	Year	US Country	Album
"I'd Be Lying"	1965	—	Country Girl Singing Sensation
"I Fall to Pieces"	1965	—	Country Girl Singing Sensation
"Once You Were Mine"	1981	80	Once You Were Mine
"—" denotes a recording that did not chart or was not released in that territory.

== Other charting songs ==
List of singles, with selected chart positions and other relevant details
Title	Year	Peak chart positions	Album
Title	Year	US Bubbling	Album
"Look Who's Talking" (with Jim Reeves)	1964	15	—N/a
