= Are You Happy Baby: The Collection =

Compilation album by Dottie West
- Released: November 18, 1997
- Recorded: 1976–1984
- Genre: Country pop, countrypolitan
- Length: 40:41
- Label: Razor & Tie

Dottie West chronology
| The Essential Dottie West (1994) | Are You Happy Baby: The Collection (1997) |

Professional ratings
Review scores
| Source | Rating |
|---|---|
| Allmusic | 4/5 stars |

Are You Happy Baby: The Collection or also known as Are You Happy Baby: The Collection (1976–1984) is the name of a compilation album of country singer Dottie West's hits from the 1970s and 1980s. “Are You Happy Baby: The Collection” is currently out of print.

This large collection of tracks shows all of West's charted hits spanning 1976 to 1984, when she was at the peak of her career. West had died six years before the album's release. The album includes the six duet hits she made with Kenny Rogers, her two #1 solo hits from the early 1980s, as well as her Top 40 hits from the 1970s and 1980s as well. The material is mainly country pop or countrypolitan-styled music.

== Track listing ==
1. "When It's Just You and Me" - 3:06
2. "Every Word I Write" - 3:01
3. "Tonight You Belong to Me" - 2:15
4. "Every Time Two Fools Collide" (with Kenny Rogers) - 3:02
5. "Come See Me and Come Lonely" - 2:11
6. "Anyone Who Isn't Me Tonight" (with Kenny Rogers) - 2:22
7. "Reaching Out to Hold You" - 2:32
8. "All I Ever Need Is You" (with Kenny Rogers) - 3:07
9. "'Til I Can Make It On My Own" (with Kenny Rogers) - 3:18
10. "You Pick Me Up and Put Me Down" - 2:44
11. "A Lesson in Leaving" - 3:02
12. "Leavin's for Unbelievers" - 3:23
13. "Are You Happy Baby" - 3:29
14. "What Are We Doin' in Love" (with Kenny Rogers) - 3:02
15. "I'm Gonna Put You Back on the Rack" - 3:28
16. "It's High Time" - 3:01
17. "You're Not Easy to Forget" - 3:38
18. "She Can't Get My Love Off the Bed" - 3:14
19. "Tulsa Ballroom" - 3:18
20. "Together Again" (with Kenny Rogers) - 2:55
