= Here Comes My Baby =

Here Comes My Baby may refer to:

- "Here Comes My Baby" (Cat Stevens song), a song by Cat Stevens, and first recorded by The Tremeloes
- "Here Comes My Baby" (Dottie West song), a song by Dottie West
- Here Comes My Baby (album), an album by Dottie West
