= When It's Just You and Me =

When It's Just You and Me may refer to:

- "When It's Just You and Me" (song), a 1976 single by Dottie West
- When It's Just You and Me (album), a 1977 album by Dottie West
