= High Time =

High Time or High Times may refer to:

== Arts, entertainment, and media ==
=== Music ===
==== Albums ====
- High Time (MC5 album), a 1971 album by MC5
- High Time (TMGE album), a 1996 album by Thee Michelle Gun Elephant
- High Time, a 2010 album by Excalion
- High Times (EP), an EP by Washed Out
- High Times (Dottie West album), 1982
- High Times (Young Dro album), 2013
- High Times: Singles 1992–2006, an album by Jamiroquai

==== Songs ====
- "High Time" (song), a 1983 song by Styx
- "High Time", a 1966 UK Top 10 single by Paul Jones
- "High Time", a song by the Grateful Dead from the album Workingman's Dead
- "High Time" a 2016 song by Kacey Musgraves, from her album, Pageant Material
- "High Time", a 2022 song by Nickelback from their album Get Rollin'
- "High Time (You Quit Your Lowdown Ways)", a song by Waylon Jennings from Dreaming My Dreams
- "High Times" (song), a 1997 song by Jamiroquai
- "High Times", a song by Elliott Smith from the album New Moon
- "It's High Time", a song from Dottie West's 1982 album, High Times

== Other uses in arts, entertainment, and media ==
- High Time (film), a 1960 film directed by Blake Edwards
- High Times (TV series), a Scottish comedy drama series
- High Times, a book about Uschi Obermaier
- High Times, a cannabis subculture magazine

== Other uses ==
- High Time (horse), a chestnut Thoroughbred
