= Childhood Places =

Single by Dottie West
- B-side: "No One"
- Released: November 1967
- Recorded: May 4, 1967
- Studio: RCA Victor Studio
- Genre: Country; Nashville Sound
- Length: 3:05
- Label: RCA Victor
- Songwriters: Barry Mason; Les Reed
- Producer: Chet Atkins

Dottie West singles chronology
"Like a Fool" (1967)	"Childhood Places" (1967)	"Country Girl" (1968)

"Childhood Places" is a song written by Barry Mason and Les Reed, and recorded by American country artist Dottie West. It was released in November 1967 and became a top 40 chart single on the US country music chart. It was among a series of top 40 single releases by West during the 1960s. It was given positive reviews by critics and publications.

== Background and recording ==
Dottie West first achieved success in the country genre with her ballads (some of which were self-penned) that were considered both plaintive and emotional. Several of these songs became top ten US top ten country songs like "Here Comes My Baby" (1964), "Would You Hold It Against Me" (1966) and "Paper Mansions" (1967). Among her 1960s singles was "Childhood Places", a song written by Barry Mason and Les Reed. The track was cut at the RCA Victor Studio in Nashville, Tennessee on May 4, 1967. The session was produced by Chet Atkins. The song's story line inspired West to record it because it reminded her of her three sons.

== Release, chart performance and critical reception ==
"Childhood Places" was released as a single by RCA Victor in November 1967. It was backed on the B-side by West's self-penned song "No One". It was distributed as a seven-inch vinyl record. Following its release, it was given positive reviews. Billboard magazine believed the song to have pop potential, calling it a "plaintive, "meaningful ballad". Cashbox magazine also praised the track, stating, "With a deckful of pretty sounds and sentimental spicing, the lark takes off on what should be another chart journey for her."

In later years, when reviewing the compilation The Essential Dottie West, Bill Carpenter of AllMusic called the track both "superb" and "quiet". "Childhood Places" made its debut on the US Billboard Hot Country Songs on December 16, 1967. Spending a total of 12 weeks there, it reached the number 24 position on February 24, 1968. It became West's twelfth top 40 single on the US country chart in her career. It was one of a series of top 40 singles West had during the decade.

== Track listing ==
7 inch vinyl single

- "Childhood Places" – 3:05
- "No One" – 2:22

== Chart performance ==
Chart (1967–1968)	Peak position
US Hot Country Songs (Billboard)	24
