= If It's All Right with You =

Single by Dottie West

from the album If It's All Right with You/Just What I've Been Looking For
- B-side: "Special Memory"
- Released: October 1972
- Recorded: September 1972
- Studio: RCA Victor Studio
- Genre: Country; Nashville Sound
- Length: 2:38
- Label: RCA Victor
- Songwriter(s): Larry Henley; Kenny O'Dell
- Producer(s): Jerry Bradley

Dottie West singles chronology
| "I'm Only a Woman" (1972) | "If It's All Right with You" (1972) | "Just What I've Been Looking For" (1973) |

"If It's All Right with You" is a song written by Kenny O'Dell and Larry Henley, and recorded by American country music artist Dottie West. It was released in October 1972 as the first single from the album If It's All Right with You/Just What I've Been Looking For. The song reached the top 40 of the US country chart and the top 100 of the US Hot 100. It was given positive reviews by Cashbox following its release.

== Background and recording ==
During the 1960s, Dottie West broke through in the country market with her self-composed ballads. This included the top ten songs "Here Comes My Baby", "Would You Hold It Against Me" and "Rings of Gold". In the early 1970s, West's songs were heard on Coca-Cola advertisements, which may have accounted for increased commercial success with her recordings. "If It's All Right with You" was released following West's joint venture with Coca-Cola. The song was composed by Larry Henley and Kenny O'Dell. It was recorded in September 1972 at RCA Victor Studios in Nashville, Tennessee. The session was produced by Jerry Bradley. It featured background vocal accompaniment by the Nashville Edition.

== Release, chart performance and critical reception ==
"If It's All Right with You" was released as a single by RCA Victor in October 1972. It was backed on the B-side by the track "Special Memory". The disc was distributed as a seven-inch vinyl record. Cashbox magazine praised the track as being an "outstanding ballad performance". "If It's All Right with You" made its debut on the US Billboard Hot Country Songs chart on December 2, 1972. Spending 11 weeks there, it reached the number 28 position by February 11, 1973. It was West's twenty third top 40 entry on the Billboard country chart and her first top 40 single on the chart since 1971.

The single also became West's first to make the US Billboard Hot 100, reaching number 97 in January 1973. It also became her fourth single to make Canada's RPM Country Tracks chart, reaching number 48 around the same time frame. It was then included on West's 1973 studio album If It's All Right with You/Just What I've Been Looking For.

== Track listing ==
7 inch vinyl single

- "If It's All Right with You" – 2:38
- "Special Memory" – 2:17

== Chart performance ==
Weekly chart performance for "If It's All Right with You"
| Chart (1972–1973) | Peak position |
|---|---|
| Canada Country Tracks (RPM) | 48 |
| US Billboard Hot 100 | 97 |
| US Hot Country Songs (Billboard) | 28 |
