= Before the Ring on Your Finger Turns Green =

"Before the Ring on Your Fingers Green"

Single by Dottie West

from the album Suffer Time
- B-side: "Wear Away"
- Released: November 1965
- Recorded: September 28, 1965
- Studio: RCA Victor Studio
- Genre: Country; Nashville Sound
- Length: 1:59
- Label: RCA Victor
- Songwriter: Felice and Boudleaux Bryant
- Producer: Chet Atkins

Dottie West singles chronology
"No Sign of Living" (1965)	"Before the Ring on Your Fingers Green" (1965)	"Would You Hold It Against Me" (1965)

"Before the Ring on Your Finger Turns Green" is a song written by Felice and Boudleaux Bryant, and recorded by American country music artist Dottie West. It was released in November 1965 as the first single from the album Suffer Time. The song became a top 40 chart single on the US country music chart.

== Background and recording ==
Dottie West recorded at RCA Victor records between 1963 and 1976. It was at RCA where she developed her musical persona as a recording artist known for singing with heavy emotion. Among her top ten singles were "Here Comes My Baby" (1964), "Would You Hold It Against Me" (1966) and "Paper Mansions" (1968). West also had a series of charting top 40 singles such as "Before the Ring on Your Finger Turns Green". It was composed by Felice and Boudleaux Bryant, a husband and wife songwriting team known for writing many country singles of the era. The song was recorded on September 28, 1965 at RCA Victor Studios in Nashville, Tennessee. The session was produced by Chet Atkins.

== Release, chart performance and critical reception ==
"Before the Ring on Your Finger Turns Green" was released as a single by RCA Victor in November 1965. It was backed on the B-side by the song "Wear Away". It was distributed as a seven-inch vinyl record. It was predicted by Billboard magazine that the single would reach the top ten of their country songs chart. The publication further described the track as a "clever rhythm ballad". When reviewing the compilation RCA Country Legends: Dottie West, Thom Jurek described the song as an "excellent side". Despite Billboard's prediction, the song only reached the top 40. It entered the US Billboard Hot Country Songs chart in late 1965. It reached the number 22 position on the chart in early 1966. It became West's seventh charting single and sixth top 40 single on the US Billboard country chart. It was then released on West's 1966 album Suffer Time and served as its lead single.

== Track listing ==
7 inch vinyl single

- "Before the Ring on Your Finger Turns Green" – 1:59
- "Wear Away" – 2:40

== Chart performance ==
Chart (1965–1966)	Peak position
US Hot Country Songs (Billboard)	22

== Accolades ==
Year	Nominee / work	Award	Result	Ref.
1966	8th Annual Grammy Awards	Best Country Vocal Performance, Female	Nominated	
