= With All My Heart and Soul =

With All My Heart and Soul may refer to

- With All My Heart and Soul (album), a 1967 album by Dottie West
- With All My Heart and Soul, a 2008 mini-album by Wheesung
- "With All My Heart and Soul (Eddie Fisher song), 1954, an English version of "Anema e core"
- "With All My Heart and Soul" (Perry Como song), 1951
