= Wild West (album) =

Studio album by Dottie West
- Released: February 1981
- Recorded: June 1980
- Studios: Creative Workshop (Nashville, Tennessee)
- Genres: Country; MOR; pop
- Label: Liberty
- Producers: Randy Goodrum; Brent Maher

Dottie West chronology
Special Delivery (1980)	Wild West (1981)	High Times (1981)

Singles from Wild West
- 1. "Are You Happy Baby?" Released: December 1980; 2. "What Are We Doin' in Love" Released: March 1981; 3. "(I'm Gonna) Put You Back on the Rack" Released: June 1981

Wild West is a studio album by American country artist Dottie West. It was released by Liberty Records in February 1981. It was one of several albums that were part of West's commercial resurgence in the late 1970s and early 1980s. On the album were three singles: the chart-topping "Are You Happy Baby?" and "What Are We Doin' in Love" (a duet with Kenny Rogers). The album itself was among West's highest-peaking, reaching the top five of the US country albums chart. It was met with favorable reviews from several music publications.

== Background ==
Dottie West was considered among several female artists to elevate the popularity of women in country music during the 1960s. During that period she had top ten successes with self-written songs like "Here Comes My Baby", "Would You Hold It Against Me" and later on "Country Sunshine". Her popularity slipped as the 1970s progressed. However, after recording with Kenny Rogers, Dottie West's own solo career regained momentum. Beginning with 1980's Special Delivery, West has consistent commercial success with singles like the chart-topping "A Lesson in Leavin'". Her commercial return was also due to change in production, thanks to producers Randy Goodrum and Brent Maher. Together they not only produced West's music but also wrote much of her material. The pairing would help craft West's new studio album Wild West.

== Recording and content ==
Wild West was recorded in June 1980 at the Creative Workshop Studio in Nashville, Tennessee. Randy Goodrum and Brent Maher served as the album's co-producers. The album was collection of ten tracks. The album was said to feature different styles of music other than country. Other genres included R&B, pop and MOR. Included in the tracks was a cover of "Sorry Seems to Be the Hardest Word". Cashbox noted that both West and Juice Newton covered the song on their albums that year. Six of the tracks were original tunes written by the Goodrum-Maher pair: "Make Us a Plan", "What Are We Doin' in Love", "Right or Wrong", "Choosin' Means Losin'", "Goodbye" and "(I'm Gonna) Put You Back on the Rack". Also included was "Please Remember Me", a track co-written by Dave Loggins.

== Release and critical reception ==
Wild West was originally released by Liberty Records in February 1981. It was offered as both a vinyl LP and a cassette. Both had identical track listings. Decades later, it was re-released digitally by Capitol Records Nashville. The cover and back cover featured West wearing skin-tight spandex pants and a cowgirl hat, a style which would be considered her signature during this period. Wild West was met with favorable reviews by critics. Billboard found the album's production brought West to a more modern style that featured "studio crispness" and "punchier production". Cashbox found that album had "crossover potential". Record World commented that the album's material was both "classy" and "compelling".

== Chart performance and singles ==
Wild West first entered the US Top Country Albums chart on March 14, 1981 and would spend 32 weeks there. It was ultimately her third longest-running album on the chart. On June 13, it reached the number five position, becoming West's highest-charting album since 1979's Classics and her highest-charting solo album since 1966's Suffer Time. It was also a charting album on the Billboard 200, reaching the number 126 position. It was West's only solo album to make the chart and her third overall.

A total of three singles were spawned from Wild West. Its first was "Are You Happy Baby", which was released by Liberty Records in December 1980. It became West's fourth number one single on the US Hot Country Songs chart and her second solo number one. It was then followed by "What Are We Doin' in Love" in March 1981. Like its predecessor, it also topped the US country songs chart. Additionally, it crossed over to the US Hot 100, rising to number 14. Ultimately, it became West's highest-charting single there. On Canada's RPM Country chart, it reached number three. The third and final single from Wild West was "(I'm Gonna) Put You Back on the Rack", which was issued by Liberty in June 1981. It reached the top 20 of the US country chart, peaking at number 16 and the top 30 of the Canadian country chart, peaking at number 22.

== Track listing ==
All tracks composed by Randy Goodrum and Brent Maher; except where indicated

Side one
No.	Title	Writer(s)	Length
1.	"Make a Plan"		2:39
2.	"Are You Happy Baby?"	Bob Stone	3:29
3.	"What Are We Doin' in Love" (duet with Kenny Rogers)	Goodrum	3:04
4.	"Right or Wrong"		2:46
5.	"Choosin' Means Losin'"		3:40

Side two
No.	Title	Writer(s)	Length
6.	"Goodbye"		3:33
7.	"(I'm Gonna) Put You Back on the Rack"		3:28
8.	"Sorry Seems to Be the Hardest Word"	Elton John; Bernie Taupin	3:56
9.	"Please Remember Me"	Dave Loggins; Bruce Woodley	2:53
10.	"I Wish That I Could Hurt That Way Again"	Curly Putman; Don Cook; Rafe Van Hoy	2:50

== Personnel ==
All credits are adapted from the liner notes of Wild West.

Musical personnel

- Dottie West – vocals
- Jon Goin, Bruce Dees – guitar
- Sonny Garrish – steel guitar
- Jack Williams, Bob Wray – bass
- Shane Keister – keyboards
- Randy Goodrum – piano
- Pete Bordonali – mandolin
- Kenny Malone – drums, percussion
- Terry McMillan – harmonica
- The Sheldon Kurland Strings – strings
- Sheri Kramer, Donna McElroy, Bergen White – backing vocals

Technical personnel

- Bill Burks – art direction
- Randy Goodrum – producer
- Harry Langdon – photography
- Brent Maher – producer
- Ken Perry – mastering
- Bergen White – string arrangements

== Charts ==
=== Weekly charts ===
Chart (1981)	Peak position
US Billboard 200	78
US Top Country Albums (Billboard)	5

=== Year-end charts ===
Chart (1981)	Position
US Top Country Albums (Billboard)	22

== Release history ==
Region	Date	Format	Label	Ref.
North America	February 1981	Vinyl LP; cassette	Liberty Records	
North America	February 1981	Vinyl LP (Club Edition)	Liberty Records	
Netherlands	2019	Compact disc	EMI Music Holland	
North America	circa 2020	Music download; streaming	Capitol Records Nashville	
