= Have You Heard? (disambiguation) =

"Have You Heard?" is a 1952 popular song written by Lew Douglas, Charlie LaVere, and Roy Rodde.

Have You Heard?' may also refer to:

- Have You Heard? (Jack DeJohnette album), 1970
- Have You Heard (Dick Morrissey album), 1963
- "Have You Heard" (The Moody Blues song), a 1969 song by The Moody Blues
- Have You Heard?, the original title of the 2006 film Infamous
- "Have You Heard", a song from the 1989 Pat Metheny Group album Letter from Home

== See also ==
- Have You Heard...Dottie West, a 1971 album by artist Dottie West
- Have You Heard: Jim Croce Live, a 2006 album by Jim Croce
- Haven't You Heard (disambiguation)
