= I'm Only a Woman =

I'm Only A Woman may refer to:

- I'm Only a Woman (Dottie West album)
- I'm Only A Woman (Ben Peters song), written Ben Peters 1970, sung by Jane Morgan 1970, Skeeter Davis 1970, Lucille Starr 1970, Dottie West 1972
- "I Am Only A Woman", song by Judy Stone Arnold 1970
