= I'd Be Lying =

I'd Be Lying may refer to:

- "I'd Be Lying", a song by Chris Cagle from Chris Cagle, 2003
- "I'd Be Lying", a song by Dottie West; see Dottie West singles discography, 1965
- "I'd Be Lying", a song by George Ducas from Where I Stand, 1997
- "I'd Be Lying", a song by Greg Laswell from Three Flights from Alto Nido, 2008
- "I'd Be Lyin'", a song by Kelly Clarkson;, 2026
- "I'd Be Lyin'", a song by Little Feat from Kickin' It at the Barn, 2003
- "I'd Be Lying", a song by The Material, 2011
- "I'd Be Lying", a song by Straylight Run from The Needles the Space, 2007
