= Mommy, Can I Still Call Him Daddy =

Single by Dottie West

from the album Suffer Time
- B-side: "Suffertime"
- Released: July 1966
- Recorded: February 10, 1966
- Studio: RCA Victor Studio
- Genre: Country; Nashville Sound
- Length: 2:56
- Label: RCA Victor
- Songwriters: Bill West; Dottie West
- Producer: Chet Atkins

Dottie West singles chronology
"Would You Hold It Against Me" (1966)	"Mommy, Can I Still Call Him Daddy" (1966)	"What's Come Over My Baby" (1966)

"Mommy, Can I Still Call Him Daddy" is a song by American country music artist Dottie West. It was released as in July 1966 as the third single from the album Suffer Time The song, written by West and her then-husband Bill West, became a top 40 chart single on the US country music chart and featured West's son Dale singing on the chorus.

== Background and recording ==
Dottie West broke through as a recording artist for the first time in 1964 with the single "Here Comes My Baby". Over the next ten years, West established herself as a Nashville Sound country artist known for her emotional delivery of material. A series of singles were issued during this period, some of which reached the top ten like "Would You Hold It Against Me" (1966) and "Paper Mansions" (1968). Other singles included 1966's "Mommy, Can I Still Call Him Daddy", which was co-written by Dottie West and husband Bill West.

The track shows how a divorce is played out through a child's observations. The song was recorded on February 10, 1966 at RCA Victor Studios in Nashville, Tennessee. The session was produced by Chet Atkins. The recording featured West's son Dale, who was a young child at the time. When reviewing West's Suffer Time LP, AllMusic's Greg Adams theorized that Atkins had a "tough time" recording the track because it sounds as if there are overdubs on the song.

== Release, chart performance and critical reception ==
"Mommy, Can I Still Call Him Daddy" was released as a single by RCA Victor in July 1966. It was backed on the B-side by the song "Suffertime". It was distributed as a seven-inch vinyl record. The song was the third single issued from West's 1966 album Suffer Time. Cashbox magazine called the single "a heart-jugging bluser" as well as a "tear-jerking stanza". In later years, AllMusic's Greg Adams drew a similar comparison, commenting that it "could certainly drive its listeners to jump off a bridge. The wretched warbling of West's four-year-old son, Dale, renders nearly unbearable this maudlin tale of divorce as seen through the eyes of a child." Upon its original release, "Mommy, Can I Still Call Him Daddy" debuted on the US Hot Country Songs chart on August 13, 1966. Spending a total of ten weeks there, it reached the number 24 position on October 1, 1966.

== Track listing ==
7 inch vinyl single

- "Mommy, Can I Still Call Him Daddy" – 2:56
- "Suffertime" – 2:22

== Chart performance ==
Chart (1966)	Peak position
US Hot Country Songs (Billboard)	24
