= Allmond =

Allmond is a surname. Notable people with the surname include:

- Corey Allmond (born 1988), American basketball player
- Len Allmond (1925–2011), Australian rugby league footballer
- Marcell Allmond (born 1981), American football player
- Ruby Allmond (1923–2006), American singer-songwriter

== See also ==
- Almond
