= Haven't You Heard =

"Haven't You Heard" may refer to:

- "Haven't You Heard" (Patrice Rushen song), a 1980 song by Patrice Rushen
- "Haven't You Heard" (Shirley Myers song), a 1998 song by Shirley Myers
- "Haven't You Heard", a 1998 song by Jeff Buckley from his posthumous compilation album Sketches for My Sweetheart the Drunk
- Haven't You Heard... a 2011 album by LBC Crew

== See also ==
- Have You Heard? (disambiguation)
