= With All My Heart and Soul (album) =

Studio album by Dottie West
- Released: January 1967
- Recorded: July 1966
- Studio: RCA Studio B (Nashville, Tennessee)
- Genre: Country; Nashville Sound
- Label: RCA Victor
- Producer: Chet Atkins

Dottie West chronology
Suffer Time (1966)	With All My Heart and Soul (1967)	The Sound of Country Music (1967)

Singles from With All My Heart and Soul
- 1. "Paper Mansions" Released: February 1967

With All My Heart and Soul is a studio album by American country music artist Dottie West. It was released in January 1967 on RCA Victor Records and was produced by Chet Atkins. It was West's fourth studio album as a recording artist after having her first major hit in 1964. The album included 12 tracks, including the single "Paper Mansions". The song became a top ten hit on the Billboard country chart following its release. The album itself would also chart on a similar Billboard country albums survey.

== Background and content ==
With All My Heart and Soul was produced by Chet Atkins in two separate July 1966 sessions at the RCA Studio in Nashville, Tennessee. Atkins had produced West on her previous three studio releases since 1965. Atkins recognized that West's singing and songwriting style fit into the Nashville Sound sub-genre of country music. Using this sub-genre, Atkins softened West's sound on the record to create a more pop-oriented style that could broaden her appeal. He had previously incorporated strings onto previous albums such as Here Comes My Baby and Dottie West Sings. However, such instrumentation was not included on this record.

The project consisted of 12 tracks. Three tracks on the record were composed by West or co-written with her husband, Bill. West's husband is featured playing steel guitar on the project as well. Also included was songs written by other Nashville songwriters, such as Dallas Frazier, Billy Sherrill and Glenn Sutton. These writers had written tracks that were cover versions of songs previously recorded by other artists. Among these songs was David Houston's "Almost Persuaded", Bill Anderson's "The Tip of My Fingers", Jean Shepard's "Someone's Gotta Cry" and Jeannie Seely's "Don't Touch Me". Seely had also written the liner notes for the project.

== Release and reception ==
With All My Heart and Soul was originally released in January 1967 on RCA Victor Records. Upon its release, it became West's fourth studio album issued. It was first issued as a vinyl LP, containing six songs on both sides of the record. It was later released to digital retailers in the 2010s. The album spent 17 weeks on the Billboard Top Country Albums chart before peaking at number eight in March 1967. It became West's second top ten album on that chart. The album spawned one single, which was released in February 1967. The song, "Paper Mansions", became a top ten hit in May 1967, peaking at number eight on the Billboard Hot Country Singles chart. "Paper Mansions" became West's third top ten hit as a recording artist and one of several she would have during the 1960s. Although it did not receive any professional reviews, With All My Heart and Soul did receive a positive reception from its liner notes writer, Jeannie Seely. "Having the ability to understand people, Dottie interprets a song the way the writer intended and keeps listeners waiting for every word. For this album, she has chosen some of the best ballads of our time," Seely wrote.

== Track listing ==
=== Original vinyl version ===
Side one
No.	Title	Writer(s)	Length
1.	"Paper Mansions"	Ted Harris	2:55
2.	"Don't Touch Me"	Hank Cochran	3:00
3.	"No One to Cry To"	Sid Robin; Foy Willing	2:53
4.	"A Way to Survive"	Moneen Carpenter; Cochran	2:50
5.	"Don't Keep Me Lonely Too Long"	Melba Montgomery	2:51
6.	"Living on Borrowed Time"	Bill West; Dottie West; Ray Wix	2:49

Side two
No.	Title	Writer(s)	Length
1.	"Almost Persuaded"	Billy Sherrill; Glenn Sutton	3:15
2.	"The Tip of My Fingers"	Bill Anderson	3:03
3.	"With All My Heart and Soul"	B. West; D. West	2:11
4.	"It's Teardrop Time"	Dallas Frazier; Billy Mize	2:12
5.	"Someone's Gotta Cry"	Don Bowman	2:50
6.	"How Many Lifetimes Will It Take?"	D. West	2:17

=== Digital version ===
With All My Heart and Soul (2017)
No.	Title	Writer(s)	Length
1.	"Paper Mansions"	Harris	2:55
2.	"Don't Touch Me"	Cochran	3:00
3.	"No One to Cry To"	Robin; Willing	2:53
4.	"A Way to Survive"	Carpenter; Cochran	2:50
5.	"Don't Keep Me Lonely Too Long"	Montgomery	2:51
6.	"Living on Borrowed Time"	B. West; D. West; Wix	2:49
7.	"Almost Persuaded"	Sherrill; Sutton	3:15
8.	"The Tip of My Fingers"	Anderson	3:03
9.	"With All My Heart and Soul"	B. West; D. West	2:11
10.	"It's Teardrop Time"	Frazier; Mize	2:12
11.	"Someone's Gotta Cry"	Bowman	2:50
12.	"How Many Lifetimes Will It Take?"	D. West	2:17

== Personnel ==
All credits are adapted from the liner notes of With All My Heart and Soul.

Musical personnel

- Harold Bradley – guitar
- Floyd Cramer – piano
- Ray Edenton – guitar
- Buddy Harman – drums
- Roy Huskey – bass
- The Jordanaires – background vocals
- Grady Martin – guitar
- Hargus "Pig" Robbins – piano
- Bill West – steel guitar
- Dottie West – lead vocals

Technical personnel

- Chet Atkins – producer
- Jim Malloy – engineering

== Chart performance ==
Chart (1967)	Peak position
US Top Country Albums (Billboard)	8

== Release history ==
Region	Date	Format	Label	Ref.
Canada	July 1966	Vinyl	RCA Victor	
United States	July 1966	Vinyl	RCA Victor	
United States	December 15, 2017	Music download	Sony Music Entertainment	
