= When It's Just You and Me (album) =

Studio album by Dottie West
- Released: July 1977
- Recorded: September 1976–February 1977
- Studio: Jack Clement Recording (Nashville, Tennessee)
- Genre: Country; Countrypolitan
- Label: United Artists
- Producer: Larry Butler

Dottie West chronology
Carolina Cousins (1975)	When It's Just You and Me (1977)	Dottie (1978)

Singles from When It's Just You and Me
- 1. "When It's Just You and Me" Released: October 1976; 2. "Every Word I Write" Released: March 1977; 3. "Tonight You Belong to Me" Released: June 1977; 4. "That's All I Wanted to Know" Released: September 1977

When It's Just You and Me is a studio album by American country artist Dottie West. It was released in July 1977 via United Artists Records and contained 11 tracks. It was the 24th studio album in West's career and her first for the United Artists label. Of its 11 songs, four of them were spawned as singles: the title track, "Every Word I Write", "Tonight You Belong to Me" and "That's All I Wanted to Know". The title track reached the top 20 on the US and Canadian country singles charts. The album was reviewed positively by Billboard magazine following its original release.

== Background, recording and content ==
Dottie West had first found success at the RCA Victor label during the 1960s and early 1970s. With producer Chet Atkins, West recorded much of her own material and it was combined with the Nashville Sound musical style. At the label she had top ten singles with "Here Comes My Baby" (1964), "Paper Mansions" (1967) and "Country Sunshine" (1973). In 1976, West moved to United Artists Records where she would have her greatest commercial success. Her first United Artists album would be 1977's When It's Just You and Me.

The album was recorded at the Jack Clement Recording Studio located in Nashville, Tennessee in sessions held between September 1976 and February 1977. The project consisted of 11 tracks. Included was a cover of Tammy Wynette's chart-topping US country song "'Til I Get It Right". It also featured a cover of the standard "Tonight You Belong to Me". Remaining tracks were new material. Among its new recordings was "The Lovin' Kind", which was co-written by the album's producer Larry Butler.

== Release and critical reception ==
When It's Just You and Me was originally released in July 1977 on United Artists Records. It was West's 24th studio album in her career. The label originally distributed it as a vinyl LP, featuring five songs on "side 1" and six songs on "side 2". It was later be re-released digitally via Capitol Records Nashville. When It's Just You and Me was reviewed positively by Billboard magazine in July 1977. "If you can get past the cover, which doesn't say much for the artist, you'll find some interesting material included inside," the publication wrote. The magazine also made note of the album's use of both uptempo material and ballads. Although no formal review was given, AllMusic named the title track, "By Your Side" and "Save a Little for the Morning" as "AllMusic track picks".

== Chart performance and singles ==
When It's Just You and Me spent three weeks on the US Billboard Top Country Albums chart. Making its debut on July 30, 1977, the album later reached the number 44 position by August. It was West's fifteenth album to make the Billboard country chart and was among her lowest-charting albums there. A total of four singles were spawned from When It's Just You and Me. The title track was first released as the lead single in October 1976. In early 1977, it reached number 19 on the US Hot Country Songs chart and number 12 on the Canadian RPM Country Tracks chart. "Every Word I Write" was issued as the album's second single in March 1977. By May 1977, it reached the number 28 position on the US country chart and number 33 on the Canadian country chart. "Tonight You Belong to Me" was issued as the third single in June 1977. It later reached number 30 on the US country chart and number 42 on the Canadian country chart. The fourth and final single would be "That's All I Wanted to Know". It reached number 57 on the US country chart in November 1977.

== Track listing ==
Side one
No.	Title	Writer(s)	Length
1.	"When It's Just You and Me"	K. O'Dell	3:04
2.	"That's All I Wanted to Know"	E. Penney; H. Moffat	3:07
3.	"Tonight You Belong to Me"	B. Rose; L. David	2:13
4.	"You're a Beautiful Place to Be"	V. Stephenson	2:47
5.	"By Your Side"	B. Peters	2:32

Side two
No.	Title	Writer(s)	Length
1.	"Every Word I Write"	R. Bowling; G. Richey; J. Crutchfield	2:56
2.	"All Night Long"	R. Mainegra; M. Blackford	2:50
3.	"Save a Little for the Morning"	M.A. Leiken; G. Sklerov	3:22
4.	"The Lovin' Kind"	L. Butler; R. Bowling	2:55
5.	"'Til I Get It Right"	R. Lane; L. Henley	2:45
6.	"Tiny Fingers"	J. Chesnut	3:05

== Personnel ==
All credits are adapted from the liner notes of When It's Just You and Me.

Musical personnel

- Tommy Allsup – Bass guitar
- Eddy Anderson – Drums
- Byron Bach – Strings
- Brenton Banks – Strings
- George Binkley – Strings
- Jimmy Capps – Guitar
- Jerry Carrigan – Drums
- Marvin Chantry – Strings
- Roy Christensen – Strings
- Pete Drake – Steel guitar
- Ray Edenton – Guitar
- Jack Eubanks – Guitar
- Carl Gorodetzky – Strings
- Lennie Haight – Strings
- Buddy Harman – Drums
- Sheldon Kurland – Strings
- Carol Montgomery – Background vocals
- The Jordanaires – Background vocals
- Bob Moore – Bass
- Joe Osborn – Bass
- George Richey – Keyboards
- Hargus "Pig" Robbins – Keyboards
- Billy Sanford – Guitar
- Jerry Shook – Guitar
- Steven Smith – Strings
- Samuel Terranova – Strings
- Gary Vanosdale – Strings
- Dottie West – Lead vocals
- Bobby Wood – Keyboards
- Reggie Young – Guitar

Technical personnel

- Bill Burks – Design
- Larry Butler – Producer
- Bill Justis – String arrangement
- Ria Lewerke – Art direction
- Gary Regester – Photography
- Billy Sherrill – Engineer
- Bob Sowell – Mastering

== Chart performance ==
Chart (1977)	Peak position
US Top Country Albums (Billboard)	44

== Release history ==
Region	Date	Format	Label	Ref.
North America	July 1977	Vinyl LP	United Artists Records	
South Africa	July 1977	Vinyl LP	United Artists Records	
North America	circa 2023	Music download; streaming	Capitol Records Nashville	
