= If It's All Right with You/Just What I've Been Looking For =

If It's All Right With You/Just What I've Been Looking For

Studio album by Dottie West
- Released: May 1973
- Recorded: December 1972
- Studio: RCA Studio B (Nashville, Tennessee)
- Genre: Country; Nashville Sound
- Label: RCA Victor
- Producer: Jerry Bradley

Dottie West chronology
I'm Only a Woman (1972)	If It's All Right With You/Just What I've Been Looking For (1973)	Country Sunshine (1973)

Singles from If It's All Right with You/Just What I've Been Looking For
- 1. "If It's All Right with You" Released: October 1972; 2. "Just What I've Been Looking For" Released: March 1973

If It's All Right with You/Just What I've Been Looking For is a studio album by American country music artist Dottie West. It was released in May 1973 on RCA Victor Records and was produced by Jerry Bradley. The project was West's 20th studio recording in her music career. It consisted of ten tracks, two of which became minor hits on the country charts in 1973. The album's contemporary sound helped modernize West's music, bringing the album to chart on the Billboard country albums survey in 1973.

== Background and content ==
If It's All Right with You/Just What I've Been Looking For marked ten years of West recording with the RCA Victor label. To commemorate her anniversary, producer Jerry Bradley brought in a more modern sound, unlike her previous album releases. Bradley brought in songwriter Kenny O'Dell to compose two songs for the project. He also wrote the liner notes. "Country-Pop, country-rock, country-folk, country-funk -- an on and on and on. All the tags and labels we need to identify and pigeonhole the ever-changing music scene. At least we try," O'Dell said in response to the album's new sound. West also remarried during this time. Her new husband is included on the album cover (Byron Metcalf).

The project was a collection of ten newly-recorded tracks by West. Among the album's tracks was a cover of Tanya Tucker's "Delta Dawn" and Roberta Flack's pop hit "Killing Me Softly with His Song". O'Dell composed the album's two singles, along with co-writer Larry Henley. Also brought in to contribute tracks was Larry Gatlin, who was a new recording artist by this point. A few years prior, West had discovered Gatlin after being impressed by his songwriting. This led to his own recording contract. Also included is the track "I'm Your Country Girl". The song was the basis for a commercial jingle West composed for Coca-Cola.

== Release and reception ==
If It's All Right with You/Just What I've Been Looking For was released in May 1973 on RCA Victor Records, making it West's 20th studio album. It was issued as a vinyl LP, consisting of five songs on each side of the record. It became West's first album in three years to make the Billboard Top Country Albums chart, reaching number 37 by July 23, 1973. The album was reviewed positively by Billboard in May 1973. Writers praised West's voice and vocal delivery. "But it has feeling, plenty of it, and great numbers, which she performs to absolute perfection," they commented.

Two singles were released from the record, one of which became a top 40 hit. The first single spawned was "If It's All Right with You" in October 1972. Spending 11 weeks on the Billboard Hot Country Singles chart, the single peaked at number 28 by February 1973. It was West's first top 40 hit since 1971. "If It's All Right with You" was also West's first entry on the Billboard Hot 100, reaching number 97 in January 1973. Additionally, it was her first single since 1968 to make the Canadian RPM Country Singles chart, reaching number 48. "Just What I've Been Looking For" was released as a single in March 1973. The single only reached number 44 on the country songs chart later that year.

== Track listing ==
Side one
No.	Title	Writer(s)	Length
1.	"Just What I've Been Looking For"	Kenny O'Dell	2:37
2.	"Delta Dawn"	Larry Collins; Alex Harvey	3:22
3.	"Killing Me Softly with His Song"	Charles Fox; Norman Gimbel	4:20
4.	"If It's All Right with You"	Larry Henley; O'Dell	2:38
5.	"Try to Win a Friend"	Larry Gatlin	3:36

Side two
No.	Title	Writer(s)	Length
1.	"It Was Love While It Lasted"	Henley; Red Lane	2:35
2.	"Short and Sweet"	Billy Joe Shaver	3:05
3.	"It Sure Seemed Right"	Johnny Russell; Michael Russell	3:02
4.	"Bitter They Are, Harder They Fall"	Gatlin	3:36
5.	"I'm Your Country Girl"	Billy Davis; Dottie West	2:13

== Personnel ==
All credits are adapted from the liner notes of If It's All Right with You/Just What I've Been Looking For.

Musical personnel

- Harold Bradley – bass guitar
- David Briggs – piano
- Jimmy Capps – electric guitar
- Bobby Dyson – bass
- Ray Edenton – acoustic guitar
- Larry Gatlin – background vocals
- Paul Kelley – background vocals
- Charlie McCoy – bass
- Byron Metcalf – drums
- Weldon Myrick – steel guitar
- Hargus "Pig" Robbins – piano
- Dale Sellers – guitar
- Buddy Spicher – fiddle, violin
- Henry Strzelecki – bass
- Jerry Shook – guitar
- Bobby Thompson – banjo
- Dottie West – lead vocals
- Chip Young – guitar

Technical personnel

- Jerry Bradley – producer
- Bill McElhiney – strings
- Jimmy Moore – cover photo
- Mike Shockley – recording technician
- Bill Vandevort – engineering

== Chart performance ==
Chart (1973)	Peak position
US Top Country Albums (Billboard)	37

== Release history ==
Region	Date	Format	Label	Ref.
North America	May 1973	Vinyl	RCA Victor	
United Kingdom	May 1973	Vinyl	RCA Victor	
North America	circa 2023	Music download; streaming	Sony Music Entertainment	
