= She Can't Get My Love Off the Bed =

Single by Dottie West

from the album Full Circle
- B-side: "Hurt"
- Released: August 1982
- Recorded: April 1982
- Studio: Young 'Un Sound, Murfreesboro, Tennessee
- Genre: Country; country pop
- Length: 3:11
- Label: Liberty
- Songwriter(s): Debbie Hupp; Bob Morrison
- Producer(s): Larry Gatlin; Chip Young

Dottie West singles chronology
"You're Not Easy to Forget" (1982)	"She Can't Get My Love Off the Bed" (1982)	"If It Takes All Night" (1982)

"She Can't Get My Love Off the Bed" is a song written by Debbie Hupp and Bob Morrison, and recorded by American country artist Dottie West. It was released in August 1982as the first single from the album Full Circle. The song reached the top 30 of the US country chart. It was given a positive review from Billboard following its release.

== Background and recording ==
Dottie West had first found success in the 1960s but was reignited by a series of successful duet recordings with Kenny Rogers. Her solo career also found a new audience. In the early 1980s, West had two number one country singles with "A Lesson in Leavin'" and "Are You Happy Baby". West also restyled her wardrobe and image to fit a younger demographic. Her songs also took on new themes aimed at sexuality. Among these songs was the single "She Can't Get My Love off the Bed". The song was co-written by Bob Morrison Debbie Hupp. It was recorded at the Young 'Un Sound studio, located in Murfreesboro, Tennessee. The track was produced by both Larry Gatlin and Chip Young.

== Release, chart performance and critical reception ==
"She Can't Get My Love off the Bed" was issued as a single by Liberty Records in August 1982. It was backed on the B-side by the track "Hurt". The disc was distributed as a seven-inch vinyl record. It was later included on West's 1982 studio album for Liberty titled Full Circle. It was given a positive review by Billboard magazine who compared the track favorably to the song "She Left Love All Over Me" by Razzy Bailey. The publication also believed the song's production evoked a more traditional sound compared West's previous single releases.

Kurt Wolff of Country Music: The Rough Guide found the song to be part of a string of country singles whose themed were about beds and sex. Wolff stated that the song "makes good combination of the words 'bed', 'love', 'get' and 'off'." Wolff the concluded, "Any allusion to stains in regards to love counts as explicit by most measuring sticks". "She Can't Get My Love off the Bed" made its debut on the US Billboard Hot Country Songs chart on September 11, 1982. It spent 11 weeks on the chart and reached the number 29 position on October. It was one of West's final singles to make the top 30 in her career.

== Track listing ==
7 inch vinyl single

- "She Can't Get My Love off the Bed" – 3:11
- "Hurt" – 3:41

== Chart performance ==
Weekly chart performance for "She Can't Get My Love off the Bed"
Chart (1982)	Peak position
US Hot Country Songs (Billboard)	29
