= What I'm Cut Out to Be =

Studio album by Dottie West
- Released: March 1968
- Recorded: November 1967
- Studio: RCA Studio B (Nashville, Tennessee)
- Genre: Country; Nashville Sound
- Label: RCA Victor
- Producer: Chet Atkins

Dottie West chronology
I'll Help You Forget Her (1967)	What I'm Cut Out to Be (1968)	Country Girl (1968)

What I'm Cut Out to Be is a studio album by American country music artist Dottie West featuring the title song written by Red Lane. It was released in March 1968 on RCA Victor Records and was produced by Chet Atkins. It was West's eighth studio recording issued during her career. The album was a collection of new recordings and cover versions. The album did however reach peak positions on national publication charts at the time of its release.

== Background and content ==
What I'm Cut Out to Be was recorded in November 1967 at RCA Studio B, a venue where West had cut most of her 1960's sessions. The album was produced by Chet Atkins. Atkins crafted the album in the Nashville Sound style of country music. The album itself consisted of 11 tracks. Some of the album's tracks were cover versions of songs first recorded by others. Many of the tracks were covers of songs by country artists. However some were covers of pop recordings. Among its pop covers was Roy Orbison's "Crying", the final track on the record. It also includes a recording of Tammy Wynette's "I Don't Wanna Play House". Several of the compositions, including the title track, was composed by songwriter Red Lane. Lane had also written the album's liner notes. "What I'm Cut Out to Be is the understatement of the decade for Dottie West. She is the ultimate of the word 'talent'," Lane wrote.

== Release and reception ==
What I'm Cut Out to Be was officially released in March 1968 on RCA Victor Records. It became West's eighth studio album at the time of its release. It was originally issued as a vinyl LP, containing six songs on "side one" and five songs on "side two" of the record. It was later re-released to digital and streaming retailers in 2018 by Sony Music Entertainment. The record spent 11 weeks on the Billboard Top Country Albums chart before peaking at number 18 in June 1968. What I'm Cut Out to Be became West's sixth album to make the latter chart. No singles were released or included from the project. Upon its release, What I'm Cut Out to Be received positive reception from Billboard magazine in their March 1968 issue. "Dottie's vocals are full of heart and style and they really cause a lump in the throat," staff writers said. They also highlighted the album tracks "My Baby's Gone" and "Where Love Is".

== Track listing ==
=== Original vinyl version ===
Side one
No.	Title	Writer(s)	Length
1.	"What I'm Cut Out to Be"	Red Lane	2:14
2.	"Where Love Is"	Dee Moeller	2:13
3.	"Catch the Wind"	Donovan	2:14
4.	"My Baby's Gone"	Hazel Houser	2:26
5.	"Look What You're Doing"	Moeller; Curly Putman	3:07
6.	"It's Over"	Jimmie Rodgers	2:37

Side two
No.	Title	Writer(s)	Length
1.	"Before the Next Teardrop Falls"	Vivian Keith; Ben Peters	2:46
2.	"I Don't Wanna Play House"	Billy Sherrill; Glenn Sutton	2:40
3.	"A Handful"	Lane	2:27
4.	"If You Go Away"	Jacques Brel; Rod McKuen	4:20
5.	"Crying"	Joe Melson; Roy Orbison	2:39

=== Digital version ===
What I'm Cut Out to Be (2018)
No.	Title	Writer(s)	Length
1.	"What I'm Cut Out to Be"	Lane	2:14
2.	"Where Love Is"	Dee Moeller	2:13
3.	"Catch the Wind"	Donovan	2:14
4.	"My Baby's Gone"	Houser	2:26
5.	"Look What You're Doing"	Moeller; Putman	3:07
6.	"It's Over"	Rodgers	2:37
7.	"Before the Next Teardrop Falls"	Keith; Peters	2:46
8.	"I Don't Wanna Play House"	Sherrill; Sutton	2:40
9.	"A Handful"	Lane	2:27
10.	"If You Go Away"	Brel; McKuen	4:20
11.	"Crying"	Melson; Orbison	2:39

== Personnel ==
All credits are adapted from the liner notes of What I'm Cut Out to Be.

Musical personnel

- Harold Bradley – guitar
- Jerry Carrigan – drums
- Floyd Cramer – piano
- Ray Edenton – guitar
- Buddy Harman – drums
- Roy Huskey – bass
- The Jordanaires – background vocals
- Grady Martin – guitar
- Charlie McCoy – harmonica, vibes
- Bob Moore – bass
- Wayne Moss – guitar
- Henry Strzelecki – bass
- Bill West – steel guitar
- Dottie West – lead vocals

Technical personnel

- Chet Atkins – producer
- Red Lane – liner notes
- Jim Malloy – engineering
- Cam Mullins – arrangement

== Chart performance ==
Chart (1968)	Peak position
US Top Country Albums (Billboard)	18

== Release history ==
Region	Date	Format	Label	Ref.
North America	March 1968	Vinyl	RCA Victor	
North America	April 6, 2018	Music download	Sony Music Entertainment	
