= Gettin' Married Has Made Us Strangers =

Single by Dottie West

from the album Dottie West Sings
- B-side: "It Just Takes Practice"
- Released: February 1965
- Recorded: January 5, 1965
- Studio: RCA Victor Studio
- Genre: Country; Nashville Sound
- Length: 2:25
- Label: RCA Victor
- Songwriters: Gary Geld; Pete Udell
- Producer: Chet Atkins

Dottie West singles chronology
"Didn't I" (1964)	"Gettin' Married Has Made Us Strangers" (1965)	"No Sign of Living" (1965)

"Gettin' Married Has Made Us Strangers" is a song written by Gary Geld and Pete Udell, and recorded by American country music artist Dottie West. It was released in March 1965 as the first single from the album Dottie West Sings. The song became a top 30 chart single on the US country music chart.

== Background and recording ==
Once signing with the RCA Victor label, West had her breakthrough recording with the Grammy award-winning single "Here Comes My Baby". During the 1960s and 1970s, West recorded a series of charting top 40 singles, including several more top ten and top 20 songs. Among her RCA singles was the song "Gettin' Married Has Made Us Strangers". The song was written by Gary Geld and Pete Udell, about a woman who regrets being married. It was recorded at RCA Victor Studios in Nashville, Tennessee in a session held on January 5, 1965. The session was produced by Chet Atkins.

== Release, chart performance and critical reception ==
"Gettin' Married Has Made Us Strangers" was released as a single by RCA Victor in March 1965. It was backed on the B-side by the song "It Just Takes Practice" (written by Jeannie Seely). It was distributed as a seven-inch vinyl record. The song entered the US Billboard Hot Country Songs chart in early 1965. It reached the number 30 position on the chart in early 1965. "Gettin' Married Has Made Us Strangers" became the fifth single of West's career to make the Billboard country chart and her fifth top 40 single on the chart. Following its release, Billboard magazine found the song had pop crossover potential. They also commented that the recording was a "well written lyric, with a pretty melody and a heart rending vocal". Cashbox believed that it was a "sentimental, slow-shufflin' weeper." Author Peter Doggett of the book Are You Ready for the Country described the song as a "maudlin tune".

== Track listing ==
7 inch vinyl single

- "Gettin' Married Has Made Us Strangers" – 2:25
- "It Just Takes Practice" – 2:30

== Chart performance ==
Chart (1965)	Peak position
US Hot Country Songs (Billboard)	30
