= Every Word I Write =

Single by Dottie West

from the album When It's Just You and Me
- B-side: "We Love Each Other"
- Released: March 1977
- Recorded: September 1976
- Studio: Jack Clement Recording (Nashville, Tennessee)
- Genre: Country; Countrypolitan
- Length: 2:56
- Label: United Artists
- Songwriters: Roger Bowling; Jan Crutchfield; George Richey
- Producer: Larry Butler

Dottie West singles chronology
"When It's Just You and Me" (1976)	"Every Word I Write" (1977)	"Tonight You Belong to Me" (1977)

"Every Word I Write" is a song written by Roger Bowling, Jan Crutchfield and George Richey, and recorded by American country music artist Dottie West. It was released in 1977 as the second single from the album When It's Just You and Me. The song reached the top 30 of the US country chart and the top 40 of the Canadian country chart. It was given a positive review from Billboard following its release.

== Background and recording ==
Dottie West initially found success with a series of singles released under RCA Victor during the 1960s and 1970s. In 1977, she left the label and signed a new contract with United Artists Records. In the process, West changed her musical sound and personal image. Her music began shifting towards the sounds of adult contemporary and country pop. West's second United Artists release was the single "Every Word I Write". It was written by Roger Bowling, Jan Crutchfield and George Richey. The song was cut at the Jack Clement Recording Studio in September 1976 in a session produced by Larry Butler.

== Release, chart performance and critical reception ==
"Every Word I Write" was released as a single by United Artists Records in March 1977. It was backed on the B-side by the track "We Love Each Other". The disc was distributed as a seven-inch vinyl record. It was spawned as the second single from West's first United Artists album titled When It's Just You and Me. Following its release, it was given a positive review from Billboard magazine who named it among its "Top Single Picks". The magazine wrote, "West's delivery style is perfect for this tone." "Every Word I Write" was one of three singles by West that reached the US country top 30. It made its debut on the US Billboard Hot Country Songs chart on March 19, 1977. It spent a total of 12 weeks there, reaching the number 28 position on May 7. It reached a similar position on Canada's RPM Country Tracks chart, reaching number 33.

== Track listing ==
7 inch vinyl single

- "Every Word I Write" – 2:56
- "We Love Each Other" – 2:41

== Chart performance ==
Weekly chart performance for "Every Word I Write"
Chart (1977)	Peak position
Canada Country Tracks (RPM)	33
US Hot Country Songs (Billboard)	28
