= Careless Hands (album) =

Studio album by Dottie West
- Released: March 1971
- Recorded: December 1970
- Studio: RCA Studio B (Nashville, Tennessee)
- Genre: Country; Nashville Sound
- Length: 27:30
- Label: RCA Victor
- Producer: Jerry Bradley

Dottie West chronology
Country Boy & Country Girl (1970)	Careless Hands (1971)	Have You Heard...Dottie West (1971)

Singles from Careless Hands
- 1. "Careless Hands" Released: January 1971

Careless Hands is a studio album by American country music artist Dottie West. It was released in March 1971 on RCA Victor Records and was produced by Jerry Bradley. It was West's seventeenth studio recording issued during her career and contained a collection of ten tracks. The album's only single spawned was the title track.

== Background and content ==
Careless Hands was recorded in December 1970 at RCA Studio B, located in Nashville, Tennessee. The sessions were produced by Jerry Bradley. It was West's third production assignment with Bradley, who produced her two previous releases. The album contained a total of ten tracks. Four of the album's tracks were new recordings. This included the song, "Yonder Comes a Train", which was written by Red Lane. West and Lane had co-composed several songs since the late 1960s. The album's six remaining tracks were cover versions of songs previously recorded by other artists. One of these songs included a cover of Sammi Smith's "Help Me Make It Through the Night". After it was first composed, its writer (Kris Kristofferson) had first offered the song to West. However, she turned it down, finding the song to be too sexually explicit. After the song became a hit however, West decided to record it for the album. Other covers included Lynn Anderson's "(I Never Promised You a) Rose Garden", Anne Murray's "Snowbird" and Hank Williams' "I'm So Lonesome I Could Cry".

== Release and reception ==
Careless Hands was released in March 1971 on RCA Victor Records, becoming West's seventeenth studio album issued. It was first issued as a vinyl LP, consisting of five songs on each side of the record. Careless Hands did not reach any Billboard album surveys upon its release. It did spawn one single. The title track was issued as a single in January 1971. It became a minor hit in April 1971, only reaching number 48 on the Billboard Hot Country Singles chart. Careless Hands was reviewed favorably by Billboard magazine in March 1971. Writers notably praised the album's collection of covers. "Miss West is riding the singles chart with her smooth revival of the oldie 'Careless Hands', and that hit proves the basis for this fine album follow-up," writers commented.

== Track listing ==
Side one
No.	Title	Writer(s)	Length
1.	"Careless Hands"	Bob Hilliard; Carl Sigman	1:58
2.	"Snowbird"	Gene MacLellan	2:20
3.	"Only a Fool"	Jerry Foster; Bill Rice	2:01
4.	"Rose Garden"	Joe South	2:51
5.	"Help Me Make It Through the Night"	Kris Kristofferson	2:23

Side two
No.	Title	Writer(s)	Length
1.	"Yonder Comes a Train"	Red Lane	3:31
2.	"Release Me (And Let Me Love Again)"	Eddie Miller; W.S. Stevenson; Robert Yount	3:23
3.	"Your Love Takes Care of Me"	Jimmy Peppers	2:00
4.	"I'm So Lonesome I Could Cry"	Hank Williams	2:58
5.	"Only One Thing Left"	Willie Rainsford	3:28

== Personnel ==
All credits are adapted from the liner notes of Careless Hands.

Musical personnel

- Harold Bradley – guitar
- Pete Drake – steel guitar
- Ray Edenton – guitar
- Buddy Harman – drums
- The Jordanaires – background vocals
- Grady Martin – guitar
- Charlie McCoy – harmonica, vibes
- Hargus "Pig" Robbins – piano
- Bill West – steel guitar
- Dottie West – lead vocals
- Joe Zinkan – bass

Technical personnel

- Jerry Bradley – producer
- Ray Butts – recording technician
- Bill Grine – photography
- Tom Pick – engineering
- Roy Shockley – recording technician
- Bill Vandevort – engineering

== Release history ==
Region	Date	Format	Label	Ref.
Canada	October 1970	Vinyl	RCA Victor	
United Kingdom	October 1970	Vinyl	RCA Victor	
North America	circa 2023	Music download; streaming	Sony Music Entertainment	
