= You're Not Easy to Forget =

Single by Dottie West

from the album High Times
- B-side: "Something's Missin'"
- Released: February 1982
- Recorded: July 1981
- Studio: Creative Workshop
- Genre: Country; country pop
- Length: 3:41
- Label: Liberty
- Songwriters: Tom Snow; Cynthia Weil
- Producers: Randy Goodrum; Brent Maher

Dottie West singles chronology
"It's High Time" (1981)	"You're Not Easy to Forget" (1982)	"She Can't Get My Love Off the Bed" (1982)

"You're Not Easy to Forget" is a song written by Tom Snow and Cynthia Weil, and recorded by American country music artist Dottie West. It was released in February 1982 as the second single from the album High Times. The song reached the top 30 of the US country chart. It was given a positive review from Billboard following its release.

== Background and recording ==
Dottie West was first a successful 1960s singer and had a successful comeback in the late 1970s collaborating alongside Kenny Rogers with a series of duets recordings. Her solo career also relaunched and West had two chart-topping solo singles: "A Lesson in Leavin'" (1980) and "Are You Happy Baby" (1981). Among her follow-up singles was 1982's "You're Not Easy to Forget". It was a song written by Tom Snow and Cynthia Weil. West recorded the track at Creative Workshop in July 1981 alongside producers Brent Maher and Randy Goodrum.

== Release, chart performance and critical reception ==
"You're Not Easy to Forget" was first included as an album track on West's 1981 studio album High Times. It was then spawned as the second single from the album in February 1982 by Liberty Records. It was backed on the B-side by the track "Something's Missin'". The disc was distributed as a seven-inch vinyl record. The same month of its single release, it was given a positive review from Billboard magazine who named it among its "Top Single Picks". "An upbeat melody is enhanced by a memorable refrain and strong backup support," the publication wrote. "You're Not Easy to Forget" made its debut on the US Billboard Hot Country Songs chart on February 20, 1982. It spent 13 weeks on the chart and reached the number 26 position on April 17. It was one of West's final singles to make the top 30 in her career.

== Track listing ==
7 inch vinyl single

- "You're Not Easy to Forget" – 3:41
- "Something's Missin' – 3:24

== Chart performance ==
Weekly chart performance for "You're Not Easy to Forget"
Chart (1982)	Peak position
US Hot Country Songs (Billboard)	26
