= I'm Only a Woman (Dottie West album) =

Studio album by Dottie West
- Released: May 1972
- Recorded: February 1972
- Studio: RCA Studio B (Nashville, Tennessee)
- Genre: Country; Nashville Sound
- Length: 25:16
- Label: RCA Victor
- Producer: Jerry Bradley

Dottie West chronology
Have You Heard...Dottie West (1971)	I'm Only a Woman (1972)	If It's All Right With You/Just What I've Been Looking For (1973)

Singles from I'm Only a Woman
- 1. "Lonely Is" Released: May 1971; 2. "I'm Only a Woman" Released: April 1972

I'm Only a Woman is a studio album by American country music artist Dottie West. It was released in May 1972 on RCA Victor Records and was produced by Jerry Bradley. The project was West's nineteenth studio album. Among the album's ten tracks were two charting singles issued between 1971 and 1972. It was West's only studio release issued in 1972 and third studio album not receive a Billboard chart placement.

== Background and content ==
I'm Only a Woman was recorded at RCA Studio B, a venue located in Nashville, Tennessee. The album sessions were produced by Jerry Bradley. It was West's fifth time collaborating with Bradley on an album project. The collection consisted of ten tracks.

Two of the album's songs were cover versions of songs first recorded by others. The song, "Are You Lonesome Tonight", was made popular first in the 1920s and later in the 1960s by Elvis Presley. "Together Again" was composed and made a hit by Buck Owens in the 1960s as well. The album also included original tracks. However, unlike West's previous album releases I'm Only a Woman did not include a self-composed material. For the album, Bradley and West chose well-known Nashville songwriters to pen material. The project included writing by Kris Kristofferson, Ben Peters and Billy Sherrill.

== Release and reception ==
I'm Only a Woman was released in May 1972 on RCA Victor Records and was her nineteenth studio album. It was her only record released in that year. It was issued as a vinyl LP, consisting of five songs on each side of the original record. I'm Only a Woman was West's third record in a row to miss charting on the Billboard album surveys, most notably the Top Country Albums chart.

The release accounted for two singles released between 1971 and 1972. Both singles only became minor hits, according to Billboard. The first to be released was "Lonely Is" in May 1971. Spending eight weeks charting, the single peaked at number 53 on the Hot Country Singles list by July. The title track was released in April 1972. It spent a total of nine weeks on the country songs chart before reaching number 52 in July.

== Track listing ==
Side one
No.	Title	Writer(s)	Length
1.	"I'm Only a Woman"	Ben Peters	2:59
2.	"Your Sweet Love"	Billy Sherrill	2:05
3.	"Baby, I Tried"	Jeannie Fitzsimmons	2:11
4.	"Are You Lonesome Tonight"	Lou Handman; Roy Turk	2:33
5.	"Lonely Is"	Jerry Foster; Bill Rice	2:21

Side two
No.	Title	Writer(s)	Length
1.	"There's a Big Wheel"	Don Gibson	2:40
2.	"That's All That's Left of My Baby"	Walter Haynes; Lorene Mann	2:03
3.	"Together Again"	Buck Owens	1:47
4.	"Too Much Me of Me Loving You"	Jan Crutchfield; Johnny Slate	3:02
5.	"Give It Time to Be Tender"	Kris Kristofferson	3:08

== Personnel ==
All credits are adapted from the liner notes of I'm Only a Woman.

Musical personnel

- Byron Bach – cello
- Brenton Banks – violin
- George Binkley – violin
- Harold Bradley – guitar
- David Briggs – harpsichord, piano
- Marvin Chantry – viola
- Albert Coleman – violin
- Pete Drake – steel guitar
- Ray Edenton – guitar
- Lillian Hunt – violin
- The Jordanaires – background vocals
- Martin Katahn – violin
- Sheldon Kurland – violin
- Grady Martin – guitar
- Charlie McCoy – harmonica, vibes
- Snuffy Miller – drums
- Bob Moore – bass
- Hargus "Pig" Robbins – piano
- Jerry Shook – guitar
- Gary Vanosdale – viola
- Bill West – steel guitar
- Dottie West – lead vocals
- Gary Williams – cello
- Chip Young – guitar

Technical personnel

- Ray Butts – recording technician
- Jerry Bradley – producer
- Dick Cobb – cover photo
- Leslie Ladd – engineering
- Al Pachucki – engineering
- Tom Pick – engineering
- David Roys – recording technician
- Mike Shockley – recording technician
- Roy Shockley – recording technician
- Bill Vandevort – engineering

== Release history ==
Region	Date	Format	Label	Ref.
North America	May 1972	Vinyl	RCA Victor	
United Kingdom	May 1972	Vinyl	RCA Victor	
North America	circa 2023	Music download; streaming	Sony Music Entertainment	
