= Like a Fool (Dottie West song) =

Single by Dottie West

from the album I'll Help You Forget Her
- B-side: "Everything's a Wreck (Since You've Gone)"
- Released: July 1967
- Genre: Country
- Label: RCA Victor
- Songwriter(s): Yvonne DeVaney
- Producer(s): Chet Atkins

Dottie West singles chronology
"Paper Mansions" (1967)	"Like a Fool" (1967)	"Childhood Places" (1967)

"Like a Fool" is a song written by Yvonne DeVaney, and recorded by American country music artist Dottie West. It was released in July 1967 as the first single from the album I'll Help You Forget Her. The song reached number 13 on the Billboard Hot Country Singles chart.

== Chart performance ==
Chart (1967)	Peak position
US Hot Country Songs (Billboard)	13
