= Reno (Dottie West song) =

Single by Dottie West

from the album The Best of Dottie West
- B-side: "My Heart Has Changed Its Mine"
- Released: August 1968
- Genre: Country
- Label: RCA Victor
- Songwriter: Ruby Allmond
- Producer: Chet Atkins

Dottie West singles chronology
"Country Girl" (1968)	"Reno" (1968)	"Rings of Gold" (1969)

"Reno" is a song written by Ruby Allmond, and recorded by American country music artist Dottie West. It was released August 1968 as the first single from the album The Best of Dottie West. The song peaked at number 19 on the Billboard Hot Country Singles chart. In addition, "Reno" peaked at number 6 on the Canadian RPM Country chart.

== Chart performance ==
Chart (1968)	Peak position
US Hot Country Songs (Billboard)	19
Canadian RPM Country Tracks	6
