= Ruby Allmond =

American singer-songwriter

Ruby Nell Allmond (born 1923, Fannin County, Texas – died 2006) was an American singer/songwriter.

== Early years ==
Allmond was born on May 2, 1923, in Fannin County, Texas, near the town of Bailey. Her parents were Arthur M. Allmond and Lou Cole Allmond. The youngest of four children, she was raised on a cotton and corn farm. Though the family farmed for a living, they also performed music, and Allmond sang publicly for the first time at the age of four. She started playing country fiddle at a young age, borrowing a violin from her brother, Charles Raymond, and she practiced for long hours.

== Career ==
Allmond started her career as a musician in 1940, touring Oklahoma and North Texas. She performed in one band with her brothers, Charles Raymond and James Roy, while displaying a novel bowing technique, which combined harmony and rhythm. Later in the decade she toured with fellow violinists, Georgia “Slim” Rutland and Howard “Howdy” Forrester.

In the 1940s Ruby was playing in these shows with two very renowned fiddle players, Also during this time she was a part of a band that included her two brothers, Raymond and Roy Allmond, who played acoustic rhythm guitars, and Harold Carder, who played stand up bass. She eventually formed her own band, Texas Jamboree, which included Guy Bryant, his children Joyce and Gene Bryant, and Clay Harvey.

In 1968, Audra Brock and Ruby decided to take some of Ruby's songs to Nashville. They sent a tape to Bob Jennings, the publisher at RCA. He invited them to a studio for a demo recording session. Ruby sang "Reno", which ended up being recorded by Dottie West and produced by Chet Atkins, was a hit, breaking the Top Ten on the country music charts. Atkins produced several of her songs, and even told Ruby that she was "a great songwriter".

Besides writing songs to be recorded and produced by others, Ruby also wrote songs that were specifically for stage shows. Later on in her career Ruby participated in many local stage shows around the Bonham, Texas, area to raise funds for the community. One song that was strongly requested was "Listen to The Mockingbird". The original arrangement came from back in her early fiddling days. She arranged the song in such a way as to highlight her extraordinary fiddle playing. Other crowd favorites like "Honky-Tonk Rock" and "Indian Rock" had obvious country music roots, but also influences from other genres.

Before Ruby's death in January 2006, she and Brock had been working on assembling some of her songs into a collection. The songs were compiled into 2-CD sets, Today I'll Think About the Rain and A Little Home Cooking. The latter CD set, A Little Home Cooking, came about because the residents around Bonham requested a compilation of Ruby’s instrumental work. Audra promptly assembled an album of 22 instrumental songs played by Ruby on the fiddle and guitar.
