= Country Girl (Dottie West album) =

Studio album by Dottie West
- Released: August 1968
- Recorded: February 1968
- Studios: RCA Studio B (Nashville, Tennessee)
- Genres: Country; Nashville Sound
- Label: RCA Victor
- Producer: Chet Atkins

Dottie West chronology
What I'm Cut Out to Be (1968)	Country Girl (1968)	Feminine Fancy (1968)

Singles from Country Girl
- 1. "Country Girl" Released: March 1968

Country Girl is a studio album by American country music artist Dottie West. It was released in August 1968 on RCA Victor Records and was produced by Chet Atkins. The project was West's ninth studio album and second to be released in 1968. The album consisted of 12 tracks, which contained new recordings and cover versions. The album's title track became a major hit in 1968 and would later be a signature song for West.

== Background and content ==
Country Girl was recorded in February 1968 at RCA Studio B in Nashville, Tennessee. The sessions were produced by Chet Atkins, West's long-time producer on the RCA Victor label. Atkins helped define West's musical style and sound in her early recording career by implementing the Nashville Sound into her recordings. In this style, West's sound was backed by pop-tinged arrangements that could appeal to a wide array of listeners.

Country Girl was a collection of 12 tracks. Country Girl included covers of Bob Wills's "Faded Love" and Willie Nelson's "Little Things". Among the album's new recordings was the title track. West would later be recruited to write and sing jingles for Coca-Cola commercials after an associate of McCann-Erickson Advertising heard the title track. The song and the album would later help define West's early musical persona. West dedicated the album to her daughter, Shelly, whose picture is featured on the album cover. "Shelly, you look like your Daddy, with your blue eyes, blond hair and even the same smile, but today you reminded me of me, for I saw you as a country girl, like I was -- and always will be," West wrote in the liner notes.

== Release and chart performance ==
Country Girl was released in August 1968, becoming West's ninth studio album issued and her second to be issued in 1968. It was first issued as a vinyl LP, containing six songs on each side. In 2018, it was reissued to digital retailers through Sony Music Entertainment. The album peaked at number 18 on the Billboard Top Country Albums chart after eight weeks on the list. The title track was the album's only single issued. Released in March 1968, it became a major hit after reaching number 15 on the Billboard Hot Country Singles chart. In Canada, the single also became a major hit, reaching number five on the RPM Country Singles chart. It became West's first song to chart on any Canadian chart and only one of two solo singles to chart within the decade.

== Track listing ==
=== Original vinyl version ===
Side one
No.	Title	Writer(s)	Length
1.	"Country Girl"	Red Lane; Dottie West	3:03
2.	"Less of Me"	Glen Campbell	2:35
3.	"Faded Love"	Bob Wills; Jack Wills; John Wills	3:25
4.	"Just Call Me Lonesome"	Rex Griffin	3:20
5.	"My Goal for Today"	Chuck Howard; Ray Pennington	1:59
6.	"You've Still Got a Place in My Heart"	Leon Payne	2:37

Side two
No.	Title	Writer(s)	Length
1.	"Little Things"	Shirley Nelson; Willie Nelson	3:10
2.	"I'm Too Far Gone"	Billy Sherrill	3:35
3.	"The Healing Hands of Time"	W. Nelson	2:25
4.	"When"	Ben Peters	2:37
5.	"Hold Me Tighter"	W. Nelson	2:18
6.	"Take These Chains from My Heart"	Hy Heath; Fred Rose	2:38

=== Digital version ===
Country Girl (2018)
No.	Title	Writer(s)	Length
1.	"Country Girl"	Lane; West	3:03
2.	"Less of Me"	Campbell	2:35
3.	"Faded Love"	B. Wills; Jack Wills; John Wills	3:25
4.	"Just Call Me Lonesome"	Griffin	3:20
5.	"My Goal for Today"	Howard; Pennington	1:59
6.	"You've Still Got a Place in My Heart"	Payne	2:37
7.	"Little Things"	S. Nelson; W. Nelson	3:10
8.	"I'm Too Far Gone"	Sherrill	3:35
9.	"The Healing Hands of Time"	W. Nelson	2:25
10.	"When"	Peters	2:37
11.	"Hold Me Tighter"	W. Nelson	2:18
12.	"Take These Chains from My Heart"	Heath; Rose	2:38

== Personnel ==
All credits are adapted from the liner notes of Country Girl.

Musical personnel

- Floyd Cramer – piano
- Buddy Harman – drums
- Grady Martin – dobro, guitar
- Charlie McCoy – harmonica, vibes
- Bob Moore – bass
- Wayne Moss – guitar
- The Nashville Edition – background vocals
- Bill West – steel guitar
- Dottie West – lead vocals

Technical personnel

- Chet Atkins – producer
- Jim Malloy – engineering
- Bill Vandevort – engineering
- Dottie West – liner notes

== Chart performance ==
Chart (1968)	Peak position
US Top Country Albums (Billboard)	18

== Release history ==
Region	Date	Format	Label	Ref.
North America	August 1968	Vinyl	RCA Victor	
North America	June 15, 2018	Music download	Sony Music Entertainment	
