= Let Me off at the Corner =

Single by Dottie West
- B-side: "I Wish You Wouldn't Do That"
- Released: August 1963
- Recorded: May 27, 1963
- Studio: RCA Victor Studio
- Genre: Country; Nashville Sound
- Length: 2:45
- Label: RCA Victor
- Songwriters: Lou Meredith; Kronberg
- Producer: Chet Atkins

Dottie West singles chronology
| "Touch Me" (1963) | "Let Me off at the Corner" (1963) | "Love Is No Excuse" (1964) |

"Let Me off at the Corner" is a song written by Lou Meredith and Kronberg, and recorded by American country music artist Dottie West. It was released in August 1963 and became the first single to chart in West's music career to reach the top 40 and the top 30 of the American country chart.

== Background and recording ==
After several failed singles on various labels, Dottie West auditioned for producer Chet Atkins resulting in her signing to the RCA Records, where she remained from 1963 until 1976. Her first charting single was 1963's "Let Me off at the Corner". The song was composed by Lou Meredith and Kronberg. West recorded the song at the RCA Victor Studio in Nashville, Tennessee. The session was held on May 27, 1963 and was produced by Atkins.

== Release, chart performance and reception ==
"Let Me off at the Corner" was released as a single by RCA Victor in August 1963. It was backed on the B-side by the song "I Wish You Wouldn't Do That". It was distributed as a seven-inch vinyl record. The song entered the US Billboard Hot Country Songs chart in August 1963. It reached the number 29 position on the chart later that year. It was the first of West's singles to reach any sales chart in her career. When reviewing West's 2001 compilation RCA Country Legends, Thom Jurek of AllMusic praised the song, calling it an "excellent side".

== Track listing ==
7 inch vinyl single

- "Let Me off at the Corner" – 2:45
- "I Wish You Wouldn't Do That" – 2:10

== Chart performance ==
| Chart (1963) | Peak position |
|---|---|
| US Hot Country Songs (Billboard) | 29 |
