= Full Circle (Dottie West album) =

Album by Dottie West

Studio album by Dottie West
- Released: September 1982
- Recorded: April 1982
- Studio: Young 'Un Sound, Murfreesboro, Tennessee
- Genre: Country pop
- Label: Liberty
- Producer: Larry Gatlin

Dottie West chronology
High Time (1982)	Full Circle (1982)	New Horizons (1983)

Full Circle is a studio album by American country music singer Dottie West, released in 1982.

Full Circle was one of Dottie West's most unsuccessful albums in her career. Her solo career in country music had been revitalized in 1978 with the help of a string of hit duets with Kenny Rogers. By 1979, hits of her own were making the Country Top 10 again. However, by late 1982, after the release of this album, her country success was beginning to fade. Many fans felt it was a mistake for West to record some of the very sexual songs (at least by her standards) on the album and the two single releases were her lowest charting records in several years. This album did not chart on the "Top Country Albums" chart at all, but it did produce two country singles which charted on Billboard's Country chart, "She Can't Get My Love Off the Bed" (which was quite successful, in the Top 30) and "If It Takes All Night" (didn't hit the Top 40).

== Track listing ==
No.	Title	Writer(s)	Length
1.	"She Can't Get My Love Off the Bed"	Bob Morrison, Debbie Hupp	3:11
2.	"Lover to Lover" (duet with John Schneider)	Jerry Fuller, John Hobbs	2:54
3.	"My First Night Alone"	Charles Vassy	3:33
4.	"Bitter They Are, Harder They Fall"	Larry Gatlin	3:21
5.	"You Smiled at Me"	F. W. Kirkpatrick	2:54
6.	"Here In My Arms"	Gatlin	3:03
7.	"Try to Win a Friend"	Gatlin	3:32
8.	"The Dream That Got a Little Out of Hand"	Gatlin	3:21
9.	"Your Sweet Lies"	David Chamberlain, James Vest	2:52
10.	"If It Takes All Night"	Gloria Sklerov, Dann Rogers	3:31

== Charts ==
Singles – Billboard (North America)

Year	Single	Chart	Position
1982	"She Can't Get My Love Off the Bed"	Hot Country Singles	29
1982	"If It Takes All Night"	Hot Country Singles	63
