= No Sign of Living =

Single by Dottie West

from the album Dottie West Sings
- B-side: "Night Life"
- Released: July 1965
- Recorded: January 5, 1965
- Studio: RCA Victor Studio
- Genre: Country; Nashville Sound
- Length: 2:14
- Label: RCA Victor
- Songwriter: Mirriam Eddy
- Producer: Chet Atkins

Dottie West singles chronology
"Gettin' Married Has Made Us Strangers" (1965)	"No Sign of Living" (1965)	"Before the Ring on Your Finger Turns Green" (1965)

"No Sign of Living" is a song written by Mirriam Eddy, also known as Jessi Colter, and recorded by American country music artist Dottie West. It was released in July 1965 as the second single from the album Dottie West Sings. The song became a top 40 chart single on the US country music chart.

== Background and recording ==
At the RCA Victor label, Dottie West recorded a series of Nashville Sound-styled singles that regularly made the top 40 and on occasion the top ten of the country charts. Some of these recordings were self-written while others were written by other songwriters. One of her RCA singles composed by other writers was 1965's "No Sign of Living". The song was written by Mirriam Eddy, who would later adopt the stage name Jessi Colter. Colter began as a songwriter and eventually had success as a recording artist in her own right with songs like 1975's "I'm Not Lisa". "No Sign of Living" was recorded at RCA Victor Studios in Nashville, Tennessee on January 5, 1965. The session was produced by Chet Atkins.

== Release, chart performance and critical reception ==
"No Sign of Living" was released as a single by RCA Victor in July 1965. It was backed on the B-side by a cover of Willie Nelson's "Night Life". It was distributed as a seven-inch vinyl record. Billboard magazine predicted the song would "reach the top ten of the Hot Country Singles chart" when reviewing it, also describing it as "plaintive" and "sensitively-rendered". However, the song only reached the top 40 after entering the US Billboard Hot Country Songs chart in mid 1965. It reached the number 32 position on the chart in early 1965. It became West's sixth charting single and sixth top 40 single on the US Billboard country chart. It was released on West's second studio album Dottie West Sings.

== Track listing ==
7 inch vinyl single

- "No Sign of Living" – 2:14
- "Night Life" – 2:18

== Chart performance ==
Chart (1965)	Peak position
US Hot Country Songs (Billboard)	32
