= Suffer Time =

Studio album by Dottie West
- Released: July 1966
- Recorded: September 1965–February 1966
- Studio: RCA Studio B (Nashville, Tennessee)
- Genre: Country; Nashville Sound
- Label: RCA Victor
- Producer: Chet Atkins

Dottie West chronology
Dottie West Sings (1965)	Suffer Time (1966)	With All My Heart and Soul (1967)

Singles from Suffer Time
- 1. "Before the Ring on Your Finger Turns Green" Released: November 1965; 2. "Would You Hold It Against Me" Released: February 1966; 3. "Mommy, Can I Still Call Him Daddy" Released: July 1966; 4. "What's Come Over My Baby" Released: October 1966

Suffer Time is a studio album by American country music artist Dottie West. It was released in July 1966 on RCA Victor Records and was produced by Chet Atkins. It was West's third studio album as a music artist and was her first concept album in her career. The record's concept focused on themes related to heartbreak and lost love. It included new compositions and cover versions of other recordings. These recordings included four singles, including the top ten hit "Would You Hold It Against Me". Suffer Time would become one of West's most successful and highest-selling albums in her career.

== Background and content ==
Suffer Time was West's first concept album. The album's title reflected its particular themes. According to the liner notes, Suffer Time focused on themes related to "the troubled heart". It also aimed to have listeners "taste the unhappiness of the eternal loser." The album was mostly produced by Chet Atkins, however, three arrangements were done by Ray Stevens. Stevens arranged "Before the Ring on Your Finger Turns Green", "Wear Away" and "Would You Hold It Against Me". Atkins produced the remaining nine tracks. Atkins initially signed West to a recording contract with RCA Victor in 1963 and had produced her previous two studio releases for the label. He combined West's unique vocal delivery with softer musical arrangements. Ultimately, this created the sound that dominated her RCA albums, notably Suffer Time.

Suffer Time was recorded in several sessions held between September 1965 and February 1966. The first sessions included the recording of several tracks, notably the single "Before the Ring on Your Finger Turns Green". The final session on February 10 was held only for the recording of "Mommy, Can I Still Call Him Daddy". On the track, West's four year-old son Dale is featured singing on the record. Altogether, the album consisted of 12 tracks. Seven of these songs were composed by West or in conjunction with her husband, Bill West. Of these tracks was a cover of their composition "Is This Me". The song was first recorded and made a hit by Jim Reeves in 1963. Also included is a cover of Wilma Burgess's hit "Baby". Nashville songwriters Felice and Boudleaux Bryant also contributed one track to the album.

== Style ==
Suffer Time was recorded in the Nashville Sound style, a sub-genre of country music. In this musical style, country artists' music was softened to a lighter, softer version that incorporated pop arrangements. Among the Nashville Sound archetypes was Chet Atkins, who worked the sound into West's early albums. Atkins incorporated her songwriting and singing style into a Nashville Sound arrangement. "She sang with a teardrop in her voice, pure heartbreak-induced melancholy," wrote writer Kevin John Coyne.

== Release and chart performance ==
Suffer Time was first released in July 1966 on RCA Victor Records. It was West's third studio album as a recording artist. It was originally released as a vinyl LP, with six songs featured on "side one" and "side two" of the record. In the 2010s, the project was released to digital retailers via Sony Music Entertainment. Upon its initial release, an August 1966 Billboard magazine publication highlighted it on their list of "New Action LP's". According to the magazine, "these new albums, not yet on Billboard's Top LP's chart, have been reported getting strong sales action by dealers in major markets." It was not long after the magazine's publication that Suffer Time debuted on the Billboard Top Country Albums chart. It spent several weeks on the survey before reaching a peak position of number three in September 1966. It became West's most successful album effort to date on the Billboard charts. The record would also become her most-successful solo release in her career. Only West's 1981 studio album (Wild West) would reach a position close to that of Suffer Time.

Suffer Time included four singles that were released between 1965 and 1966. The first issued was "Before the Ring on Your Finger Turns Green" in November 1965. Spending a total of 14 weeks on the Billboard Hot Country Singles chart, it only reached number 22 in early 1966. In February 1966, "Would You Hold It Against Me" was released as the record's second single. It would become West's most successful hit up to that point. Spending 21 weeks charting, "Would You Hold It Against Me" became a major hit after it reached number five on the Billboard country singles chart. In July 1966, "Mommy, Can I Still Call Him Daddy" was issued as the third single, reaching number 24 on the country songs chart by October. The fourth and final single released was "What's Come Over My Baby" in October 1966. The song was Suffer Time's second major hit, reaching number 17 on the Billboard country singles survey.

== Reception ==
Professional ratings
Review scores
Source	Rating
Allmusic	3.5/5 stars
Billboard	Favorable

Music critics and publications gave Suffer Time mostly a positive response following its release. In July 1966, Billboard gave the record a positive response, highlighting the song quality and several tracks. "A beautiful collection of sad, wistful songs of love on the outs, including her current hit – 'Before the Ring on Your Finger Turns Green'," staff writers commented.

In later years, the album was given a rating of 3.5 out of 5 stars from Allmusic. Reviewer, Greg Adams noted the album's theme of despair by commenting on the record's album cover. "Dottie West is visibly suffering on the cover of her 1966 album Suffer Time. Not only is she wearing a pained expression -- she appears to be on the verge of jumping off a bridge," he wrote. Adams disliked only one "Mommy, Can I Still Call Him Daddy", but explained how further songs aided in its appeal. "The album quickly improves, however, and wrings the tears out of a platter's worth of weepers about dead and dying love," Adams commented.

== Track listing ==
=== Original vinyl version ===
Side one
No.	Title	Writer(s)	Length
1.	"Mommy, Can I Still Call Him Daddy"	Bill West; Dottie West	2:55
2.	"Another Heart for You to Break"	Carl Belew; Clyde Pitts; Jeannie Seely	1:57
3.	"Baby"	Ray Griff	2:55
4.	"Before the Ring on Your Finger Turns Green"	Felice and Boudleaux Bryant	1:59
5.	"Wear Away"	B. West; D. West	2:40
6.	"Fair Weather Lover"	B. West; D. West	2:36

Side two
No.	Title	Writer(s)	Length
1.	"Suffer Time"	B. West; D. West	2:19
2.	"Let Me Talk to You"	Don Davis; Danny Dill	2:51
3.	"Would You Hold It Against Me"	B. West; D. West	2:12
4.	"Just Out of Reach"	Virgil F. Stewart	2:50
5.	"What's Come Over My Baby"	B. West; D. West	2:52
6.	"Is This Me"	B. West; D. West	2:46

=== Digital version ===
Suffer Time (2016)
No.	Title	Writer(s)	Length
1.	"Mommy, Can I Still Call Him Daddy"	B. West; D. West	2:55
2.	"Another Heart for You to Break"	Belew; Pitts; Seely	1:57
3.	"Baby"	Griff	2:55
4.	"Before the Ring on Your Finger Turns Green"	Felice and Boudleaux Bryant	1:59
5.	"Wear Away"	B. West; D. West	2:40
6.	"Fair Weather Lover"	B. West; D. West	2:36
7.	"Suffer Time"	B. West; D. West	2:19
8.	"Let Me Talk to You"	Davis; Dill	2:51
9.	"Would You Hold It Against Me"	B. West; D. West	2:12
10.	"Just Out of Reach"	Stewart	2:50
11.	"What's Come Over My Baby"	B. West; D. West	2:52
12.	"Is This Me"	B. West; D. West	2:46

== Personnel ==
All credits are adapted from the liner notes of Suffer Time.

Musical personnel

- Harold Bradley – guitar
- Jerry Carrigan – drums
- Floyd Cramer – piano
- Ray Edenton – guitar
- Buddy Harman – drums
- The Jordanaires – background vocals
- Grady Martin – guitar
- Charlie McCoy – vibes
- Velma Smith – guitar
- Henry Strzelecki – bass
- Bill West – steel guitar
- Dottie West – lead vocals

Technical personnel

- Chet Atkins – producer
- Jim Malloy – engineering
- Ray Stevens – arrangement
- Bill Vandevort – engineering

== Chart performance ==
Chart (1966)	Peak position
US Top Country Albums (Billboard)	3

== Release history ==
Region	Date	Format	Label	Ref.
Canada	July 1966	Vinyl	RCA Victor	
United States	July 1966	Vinyl	RCA Victor	
United States	November 25, 2016	Music download	Sony Music Entertainment	
