= Love Is No Excuse =

Single by Jim Reeves and Dottie West
- B-side: "Look Who's Talking"
- Released: February 1964
- Genre: Country
- Length: 2:46
- Label: RCA
- Songwriter(s): Justin Tubb
- Producer(s): Chet Atkins

Dottie West singles chronology
"Let Me off at the Corner" (1963)	"Love Is No Excuse" (1964)	"Here Comes My Baby" (1964)

Jim Reeves singles chronology
"Welcome to My World" (1963)	"Love Is No Excuse" (1964)	"I Guess I'm Crazy" (1964)

"Love Is No Excuse" is a song recorded by American country music artists Jim Reeves and Dottie West. It was released in February 1964 and peaked at number 7 on the Billboard Hot Country Singles chart and #15 on the Bubbling Under Hot 100 singles listing. The song was also recorded by Ernest Tubb, John Grier, Connie Smith in French and English, Hank King, Jack Greene and Jeannie Seely, Shot Jackson, and Tiny Tim.

== Chart performance ==
Chart (1964)	Peak position
U.S. Billboard Hot Country Singles	7
U.S. Billboard Bubbling Under Hot 100 Singles	15
