= (I'm Gonna) Put You Back on the Rack =

Single by Dottie West

from the album Wild West
- B-side: "Sorry Seems to Be the Hardest Word"
- Released: June 1981
- Genre: Country
- Label: Liberty
- Songwriter(s): Randy Goodrum, Brent Maher

Dottie West singles chronology
"What Are We Doin' in Love" (1981)	"(I'm Gonna) Put You Back on the Rack" (1981)	"It's High Time" (1981)

"(I'm Gonna) Put You Back on the Rack" is a song written by Randy Goodrum and Brent Maher, and recorded by American country music artist Dottie West. The song peaked at number 16 on the Billboard Hot Country Singles chart. It was released in June 1981 as the third and final single from West's album Wild West. In addition, "(I'm Gonna) Put You Back on the Rack" peaked at number 22 on the Canadian RPM Country chart.

== Chart performance ==
Chart (1981)	Peak position
US Hot Country Songs (Billboard)	16
Canadian RPM Country Tracks	22
