= What's Come Over My Baby =

Single by Dottie West

from the album Suffer Time
- B-side: "How Many Lifetimes Will It Take"
- Released: October 1966
- Genre: Country
- Label: RCA Victor
- Songwriter(s): Bill West, Dottie West
- Producer(s): Chet Atkins

Dottie West singles chronology
| "Mommy, Can I Still Call Him Daddy" (1966) | "What's Come Over My Baby" (1966) | "Paper Mansions" (1967) |

"What's Come Over My Baby" is a song co-written and recorded by American country music artist Dottie West. It was released in October 1966 as the fourth single from the album Suffer Time. The song reached number 17 on the Billboard Hot Country Singles chart. West wrote the song with her then-husband Bill.

== Chart performance ==
| Chart (1966) | Peak position |
|---|---|
| US Hot Country Songs (Billboard) | 17 |
