= Dottie West Sings =

Studio album by Dottie West
- Released: December 1965
- Recorded: September 1965
- Studio: RCA Studio B (Nashville, Tennessee)
- Genre: Country; Nashville Sound
- Label: RCA Victor
- Producer: Chet Atkins

Dottie West chronology
Here Comes My Baby (1965)	Dottie West Sings (1965)	Suffer Time (1966)

Singles from Dottie West Sings
- 1. "Gettin' Married Has Made Us Strangers" Released: March 1965; 2. "No Sign of Living" Released: July 1965

Dottie West Sings is a studio album by American country music artist Dottie West. It was released in December 1965 on RCA Victor Records and was produced by Chet Atkins. The album was West's second studio album to be released as a recording artist. The record included several songs composed by West and other writers. It also included two singles that became top 40 hits on the Billboard country chart in 1965.

== Background and content ==
Dottie West Sings was West's second album recorded in her career. The project was created following the success of West's major hit "Here Comes My Baby" and its subsequent Grammy Award in 1965. It was recorded in September 1965 at the RCA Victor Studio located in Nashville, Tennessee. It was West's second album produced by Chet Atkins. The album consisted of 12 track, similar to her first LP released in 1965. Three of the album's tracks were composed by Dottie West and her husband, Bill West. Bill West is also featured playing steel guitar on the album.

On the album, West also covered songs originally recorded by other artists. She covered Roger Miller's "When Two Worlds Collide" as well as Sonny James' "You're the Only World I Know". Two of the album's original tracks were composed by writers who would later become top country artists themselves. The sixth track, "It Just Takes Practice", was co-written by Jeannie Seely. In later years, Seely would befriend West and had major hits in the 1960s and 1970s. The opening track, "No Sign of Living", was written by Miriam Eddy. In later years, Eddy would change her name to Jessi Colter and have major hits in the 1970s.

== Release and reception ==
Dottie West Sings was released in December 1965 on the RCA Victor label. It was West's second studio album for the record label. In 2015, it was released digitally. The album spent 19 weeks on the Billboard Top Country Albums chart before reaching the number 12 position in June 1966. The album included two singles that were first released in 1965. The first single was the album's opening track, "No Sign of Living". Released in March 1965, it became a top 40 hit on the Billboard Hot Country Singles chart by July, peaking at number 30. The second single issued was the track "No Sign of Living" in July 1965. The song also became a top 40 hit on the Billboard country chart, reaching number 32. Dottie West Sings was reviewed positively by Billboard magazine in January 1965. Staff writers praised album tracks such as "No Sign of Living" and also praised the album's arrangements. "This package adds luster to the already glittering name of Dottie. The tunes are generally poignant ones, of the weeper genre, and they are of a high order," writers commented.

== Track listing ==
=== Original vinyl version ===
Side one
No.	Title	Writer(s)	Length
1.	"No Sign of Living"	Mirriam Eddy	2:14
2.	"Happiness Lives Next Door"	Willie Nelson	2:26
3.	"I Can Turn You Every Way But Loose"	Bill West; Dottie West	2:04
4.	"Left Over Corner of Your Heart"	Charlie Dick; B. West; D. West	2:23
5.	"Don't You Ever Get Tired (Of Hurting Me)"	Hank Cochran	2:40
6.	"It Just Takes Practice"	Jeannie Seely; Gail Talley	2:30

Side two
No.	Title	Writer(s)	Length
1.	"You're the Only World I Know"	Sonny James; Bob Tubert	2:10
2.	"I'll Pick Up My Heart (And Go Home)"	Buddy Killen; Roger Miller	2:45
3.	"You Took the Easy Way Out"	B. West; D. West; Stonewall Jackson	2:20
4.	"When Two Worlds Collide"	Miller	2:15
5.	"Gettin' Married Has Made Us Strangers"	Gary Geld; Peter Udell	2:25
6.	"If I Can't Stay Away Long Enough"	Benny Martin	2:29

=== Digital download version ===
Dottie West Sings (2015)
No.	Title	Writer(s)	Length
1.	"No Sign of Living"	Eddy	2:14
2.	"Happiness Lives Next Door"	Nelson	2:26
3.	"I Can Turn You Every Way But Loose"	B. West; D. West	2:04
4.	"Left Over Corner of Your Heart"	Dick; B. West; D. West	2:23
5.	"Don't You Ever Get Tired (Of Hurting Me)"	Cochran	2:40
6.	"It Just Takes Practice"	Seely; Gail Talley	2:30
7.	"You're the Only World I Know"	James; Bob Tubert	2:10
8.	"I'll Pick Up My Heart (And Go Home)"	Killen; Miller	2:45
9.	"You Took the Easy Way Out"	B. West; D. West; Jackson	2:20
10.	"When Two Worlds Collide"	Miller	2:15
11.	"Gettin' Married Has Made Us Strangers"	Geld; Udell	2:25
12.	"If I Can't Stay Away Long Enough"	Martin	2:29

== Personnel ==
All credits are adapted from the liner notes of Dottie West Sings.

Musical personnel

- Harold Bradley – guitar
- Kenneth Buttrey – drums
- Floyd Cramer – piano
- Ray Edenton – guitar
- The Anita Kerr Sings – background vocals
- Grady Martin – guitar
- Jerry Reed – guitar
- Henry Strzelecki – bass
- Bill West – steel guitar
- Dottie West – lead vocals

Technical personnel

- Chet Atkins – producer
- Anita Kerr – arrangement
- Bill McElhiney – arrangement
- Jim Malloy – engineering
- Ray Stevens – arrangement

== Chart performance ==
Chart (1965)	Peak position
US Top Country Albums (Billboard)	12

== Release history ==
Region	Date	Format	Label	Ref.
United States	December 1965	Vinyl	RCA Victor	
United States	October 16, 2015	Music download	Sony Music Entertainment	
