= I'll Help You Forget Her =

Studio album by Dottie West
- Released: November 1967
- Recorded: March 1967
- Studio: RCA Studio B (Nashville, Tennessee)
- Genre: Country; Nashville Sound
- Label: RCA Victor
- Producer: Chet Atkins

Dottie West chronology
| Dottie West Sings Sacred Ballads (1967) | I'll Help You Forget Her (1967) | What I'm Cut Out to Be (1968) |

Singles from I'll Help You Forget Her
- 1. "Like a Fool" Released: July 1967

I'll Help You Forget Her is a studio album by American country music artist Dottie West. It was released in November 1967 on RCA Victor and was produced by Chet Atkins. West's seventh studio effort, I'll Help You Forget Her was also her fourth studio offering in 1967. It included the single "Like a Fool", which became a major hit. The album itself would reach peak positions on national publication charts.

== Background and content ==
I'll Help You Forget Her was recorded in March 1967 at RCA Studio B, located in Nashville, Tennessee. The sessions were produced by Chet Atkins. Atkins was responsible for producing West's six studio offerings with the RCA Victor label. He also was responsible for originally signing her to a recording contract in 1963. Atkins incorporated the Nashville Sound sub-genre of country music onto West's 1960s albums, including I'll Help You Forget Her. He accompanied her vocal styling with the Nashville's Sound pop-sound arrangement to create her own unique sound.

The collection consisted of 12 tracks. Two of the tracks had been composed by West and her husband, Bill. Her husband is also featured playing steel guitar on the record. Several tracks on the record were arranged by country artist Ray Stevens. Stevens had also been a featured arranger on West's previous album releases for RCA. Stevens' arrangement credits include the title track, "Like a Fool" and "Give Him My Love". The album also included songs previously made successful by other artists. Among these songs was a cover of George Jones' "Walk Through This World with Me", Jack Greene's "There Goes My Everything" and Don Gibson's "(I'd Be A) Legend in My Time".

== Release and reception ==
I'll Help You Forget Her was released in November 1967 on RCA Victor Records. It became West's fourth studio offering in 1967 and seventh studio offering altogether. It was originally issued as a vinyl LP, featuring six songs on each side of the record. In the 2010s, the album was released digitally to retailers. The album spent 18 weeks on the Billboard Top Country Albums chart before peaking at number 11 in March 1968. It became West's fifth studio release to reach the Billboard charts. I'll Help You Forget Her included one single release. The track, "Like a Fool", was issued as a single in July 1967. The song became a major hit in 1967, reaching number 13 on the Billboard Hot Country Singles chart in October 1967.

== Track listing ==
=== Original LP version ===
Side one
| No. | Title | Writer(s) | Length |
|---|---|---|---|
| 1. | "Give Him My Love" | Rose Marie McCoy | 2:28 |
| 2. | "Touch My Heart" | Aubrey Mayhew; Johnny Paycheck | 2:30 |
| 3. | "Funny, Familiar, Forgotten Feelings" | Mickey Newbury | 2:36 |
| 4. | "No One" | Bill West; Dottie West | 2:22 |
| 5. | "Lonely Again" | Jean Chapel | 2:32 |
| 6. | "The Last Letter" | Rex Griffin | 3:59 |

Side two
| No. | Title | Writer(s) | Length |
|---|---|---|---|
| 1. | "I'll Help You Forget Her" | Yvonne DeVaney | 2:41 |
| 2. | "Walk Through This World with Me" | Kaye Savage; Sandy Seamons | 2:19 |
| 3. | "Everything's a Wreck (Since You're Gone)" | B. West; D. West | 2:25 |
| 4. | "(I'd Be) A Legend in My Time" | Don Gibson | 2:37 |
| 5. | "Like a Fool" | DeVaney | 2:10 |
| 6. | "There Goes My Everything" | Dallas Frazier | 2:42 |

=== Digital version ===
I'll Help You Forget Her (2017)
| No. | Title | Writer(s) | Length |
|---|---|---|---|
| 1. | "Give Him My Love" | McCoy | 2:28 |
| 2. | "Touch My Heart" | Mayhew; Paycheck | 2:30 |
| 3. | "Funny, Familiar, Forgotten Feelings" | Newbury | 2:36 |
| 4. | "No One" | B. West; D. West | 2:22 |
| 5. | "Lonely Again" | Chapel | 2:32 |
| 6. | "The Last Letter" | Griffin | 3:59 |
| 7. | "I'll Help You Forget Her" | DeVaney | 2:41 |
| 8. | "Walk Through This World with Me" | Savage; Seamons | 2:19 |
| 9. | "Everything's a Wreck (Since You're Gone)" | B. West; D. West | 2:25 |
| 10. | "(I'd Be) A Legend in My Time" | Gibson | 2:37 |
| 11. | "Like a Fool" | DeVaney | 2:10 |
| 12. | "There Goes My Everything" | Frazier | 2:42 |

== Personnel ==
All credits are adapted from the liner notes of I'll Help You Forget Her.

Musical personnel

- Harold Bradley – guitar
- Floyd Cramer – piano
- Ray Edenton – guitar
- Buddy Harman – drums
- Roy Huskey – bass
- The Jordanaires – background vocals
- Grady Martin – guitar
- Charlie McCoy – harmonica, vibes
- Bob Moore – bass
- Wayne Moss – guitar
- Bill West – steel guitar
- Dottie West – lead vocals

Technical personnel

- Chet Atkins – producer
- Jim Malloy – engineering
- Ray Stevens – arrangement

== Chart performance ==
| Chart (1967–1968) | Peak position |
|---|---|
| US Top Country Albums (Billboard) | 11 |

== Release history ==
| Region | Date | Format | Label | Ref. |
|---|---|---|---|---|
| North America | November 1967 | Vinyl | RCA Victor | |
| North America | December 8, 2017 | Music download | Sony Music Entertainment | |
