= Didn't I (Dottie West song) =

Single by Dottie West

from the album Here Comes My Baby
- B-side: "In Its Own Little Way"
- Released: November 1964
- Recorded: May 27, 1963
- Studio: RCA Victor Studio
- Genre: Country; Nashville Sound
- Length: 2:42
- Label: RCA Victor
- Songwriter: Dottie West
- Producer: Chet Atkins

Dottie West singles chronology
"Here Comes My Baby" (1964)	"Didn't I" (1964)	"Gettin' Married Has Made Us Strangers" (1965)

"Didn't I" is a song written and recorded by American country music artist Dottie West. It was released in November 1964 as the second single from the album Here Comes My Baby. The song became the fourth single to chart in West's music career, reaching the top 40 of the American country chart.

== Background and recording ==
Although she first started recording for the Starday label, it was Dottie West's signing to the RCA Victor label that broke her through commercially. Her 1964 single "Here Comes My Baby" later won a Grammy award. The song was composed by West herself. It was recorded at the RCA Victor Studio in Nashville, Tennessee. The session was held on May 27, 1963 and was produced by Atkins.

== Release and chart performance ==
"Didn't I" was released as a single by RCA Victor in November 1964. It was backed on the B-side by the song "In Its Own Little Way". It was distributed as a seven-inch vinyl record. The song entered the US Billboard Hot Country Songs chart in late 1964. It reached the number 32 position on the chart in early 1965. "Didn't I" became the fourth single of West's career to make the Billboard country chart.

== Track listing ==
7 inch vinyl single

- "Didn't I" – 2:42
- "In Its Own Little Way" – 2:19

== Chart performance ==
Chart (1964–1965)	Peak position
US Hot Country Songs (Billboard)	32
