= Country Girl (Dottie West song) =

Single by Dottie West

from the album Country Girl
- B-side: "That's Where Our Love Must Be"
- Released: March 1968
- Recorded: February 1968
- Studio: RCA Studio B (Nashville, Tennessee)
- Genre: Country
- Label: RCA Victor
- Songwriters: Red Lane, Dottie West
- Producer: Chet Atkins

Dottie West singles chronology
"Childhood Places" (1967)	"Country Girl" (1968)	"Reno" (1968)

"Country Girl" is a song co-written and recorded by the American country music artist Dottie West. It was released in March 1968 as the first single and title track from the album Country Girl. The song peaked at number 15 on the Billboard Hot Country Singles chart. In addition, "Country Girl" was West's first song to enter the Canadian RPM Country chart, reaching a peak of number 5. West wrote the song with Red Lane.

West was recruited in 1973 to write and sing jingles for Coca-Cola commercials after an associate of McCann-Erickson Advertising heard "Country Girl" (see Country Sunshine).

"Country Girl" is identified with West's early career persona: the lyrics of the song's chorus are written on her grave.

== Content ==
The song describes West's love of the country and the carefree feeling - including such things as blue skies, green meadows, butterflies, home-cooked meals and family – it brings.

== Chart performance ==
Chart (1968)	Peak position
US Hot Country Songs (Billboard)	15
Canadian RPM Country Tracks	5
