= Have You Heard...Dottie West =

Studio album by Dottie West
- Released: October 1971
- Recorded: July 1971
- Studio: RCA Studio B (Nashville, Tennessee)
- Genre: Country; Nashville Sound
- Length: 28:42
- Label: RCA Victor
- Producer: Jerry Bradley

Dottie West chronology
Careless Hands (1971)	Have You Heard...Dottie West (1971)	I'm Only a Woman (1972)

Singles from Have You Heard...Dottie West
- 1. "Six Weeks Every Summer (Christmas Every Other Year)" Released: August 1971; 2. "You're the Other Half of Me" Released: December 1971

Have You Heard...Dottie West is a studio album by American country music artist Dottie West. It was released in October 1971 on RCA Victor Records and was produced by Jerry Bradley. The album was West's eighteenth studio record released in her career and second record to be released in 1971. The album included ten tracks, two of which became singles. The first single, "Six Weeks Every Summer (Christmas Every Other Year)", became a minor hit on the country charts.

== Background and content ==
Have You Heard...Dottie West was recorded in July 1971 at RCA Studio B, located in Nashville, Tennessee. The sessions were produced by Jerry Bradley. The project was West's fourth with Bradley serving as the producer. The album was a collection of ten tracks. Six of the album's songs were cover versions of hit singles by country and pop artists. Among the record's covers was Don Gibson's "Just one Time" (which had been recently revitalized by Connie Smith), "Me and Bobby McGee" by Roger Miller (which had recently been a pop hit for Janis Joplin) and "No Love at All" by Lynn Anderson. Original tracks included "Six Weeks Every Summer (Christmas Every Other Year)" and "Wish I Didn't Love You Anymore". Larry Gatlin composed two of the album's tracks as well. It was West who discovered Gatlin and was impressed by his songwriting. The Gatlin-penned tracks were his first to be included on an artist's album.

== Release and reception ==
Have You Heard...Dottie West was released in October 1971 on RCA Victor Records, making it West's eighteenth studio album. It was issued as a vinyl LP, containing five songs on both sides of the record. The album was West's second in a row to not make the Billboard Top Country Albums chart. It also spawned two singles, which were both released in 1971. The first was "Six Weeks Every Summer (Christmas Every Other Year)", which was issued in August 1971. The single made an appearance on the Billboard Hot Country Singles chart, only peaking at number 51 after eight weeks. The second single to be issued was "You're the Other Half of Me" in December 1971. The song failed to chart. The album received praise upon its release. Billboard gave the release a warm reception in December 1971, highlighting Bradley's production and West's vocal styling. "Miss West's uncomplicated vocal style is given a similar setting by producer Jerry Bradley and the result is an LP that has class written all over it," writers commented.

== Track listing ==
Side one
No.	Title	Writer(s)	Length
1.	"You're the Other Half of Me"	Larry Gatlin	2:29
2.	"Just One Time"	Don Gibson	2:14
3.	"Once You Were Mine"	Gatlin	3:33
4.	"Put Your Hand in the Hand"	Gene MacLellan	2:31
5.	"Me and Bobby McGee"	Fred Foster; Kris Kristofferson	3:17

Side two
No.	Title	Writer(s)	Length
1.	"Six Weeks Every Summer (Christmas Every Other Year)"	Fran Powers	3:57
2.	"Wish I Didn't Love You Anymore"	Dottie West	2:01
3.	"Tiny"	Dottie Rambo	4:06
4.	"No Love at All"	Lucille Cosenza; Johnny Tillotson	2:20
5.	"Dream Baby (How Long Must I Dream)"	Cindy Walker	2:09

== Personnel ==
All credits are adapted from the liner notes of Have You Heard...Dottie West.

Musical personnel

- Byron Bach – cello
- Brenton Banks – violin
- George Binkley – violin
- Harold Bradley – guitar
- David Briggs – harpsichord, piano
- Martin Chantry – viola
- Albert Coleman – violin
- Pete Drake – steel guitar
- Ray Edenton – guitar
- Lillian Hunt – violin
- The Jordanaires – background vocals
- Martin Katahn – violin
- Sheldon Kurland – violin
- Grady Martin – guitar
- Charlie McCoy – harmonica, vibes
- Snuffy Miller – drums
- Bob Moore – bass
- Hargus "Pig" Robbins – piano
- Jerry Shook – guitar
- Gary Vanosdale – viola
- Bill West – steel guitar
- Dottie West – lead vocals
- Gary Williams – cello
- Chip Young – guitar

Technical personnel

- Jerry Bradley – producer
- Les Ladd – engineering
- Jimmy Moore – cover photo
- David Roys – recording technician
- Mike Shockley – recording technician
- Roy Shockley – recording technician
- Bill Vandevort – engineering
- Bergen White – arrangement, conducting

== Release history ==
Region	Date	Format	Label	Ref.
North America	October 1971	Vinyl	RCA Victor	
United Kingdom	October 1971	Vinyl	RCA Victor	
North America	circa 2023	Music download; streaming	Sony Music Entertainment	
