= Just Dottie =

Studio album by Dottie West
- Released: October 1984 re-released October 31, 2000
- Recorded: 1984
- Genre: Countrypolitan
- Label: Permian Records re-issued (First Gen.)
- Producer: Jerry Crutchfield

Dottie West chronology
The Best of Dottie West (1984)	Just Dottie (1984)	Greatest Hits (1992)

Professional ratings
Review scores
Source	Rating
Allmusic	link

Just Dottie (reissued as Just Dottie Again) is the name of the final country music album released by Dottie West in 1984 under Permian Records, after eight years of recording for United Artists Records/Liberty Records. This is Dottie West’s last release before her death in 1991.

The album was West's only LP release for Permian Records, a small Dallas-based country music label distributed by MCA Records. The album spawned three charting singles, the third release, "We Know Better Now" being the most successful, peaking at #53 on the Hot Country Singles and Tracks list in 1985. West did not record any additional music for Permian and the single ultimately proved to be the last record of her career, although she was still active in concert and television appearances up to her death in 1991.

In 2000, the album was re-released on CD by First Generation Records, and re-titled Just Dottie Again.

== Track listing ==
1. "Let Love Come Lookin' For You" (Jan Buckingham) – 3:12
2. "Where Is a Woman to Go" (K. T. Oslin) – 3:15
3. "What's Good For the Goose (Is Good For the Gander)" (Alex Harvey) – 2:35
4. "Blue Fiddle Waltz" (Lionel Cartwright) – 2:56
5. "We Know Better Now" (Steve Dean, Frank Myers) – 3:37
6. "Tell Me Again" (Jerry Crutchfield) – 2:41
7. "Eyes of a Storm" (Ronny Scaife, Phil Thomas) – 2:31
8. "Ain't Nothin' Like a Woman" (Marvin Thomas, Mark Leggett) – 3:29
9. "Memories For Sale" (Linda Hargrove, Mary Ann Kennedy, Pam Rose) – 3:32
10. "Lady Blonde and Fair" (Brenda Burns) – 3:01

== Charts ==
Singles – Billboard (North America)

Year	Single	Chart	Position
1984	"What's Good for the Goose (Is Good for the Gander)"	Hot Country Singles	77
1984	"Let Love Come Lookin' for You"	Hot Country Singles	67
1985	"We Know Better Now"	Hot Country Singles	53
