= It's High Time =

Single by Dottie West

from the album High Times
- B-side: "Don't Be Kind"
- Released: October 1981
- Genre: Country
- Length: 3:00
- Label: Liberty
- Songwriters: Randy Goodrum, Brent Maher
- Producers: Brent Maher, Randy Goodrum

Dottie West singles chronology
"(I'm Gonna) Put You Back on the Rack" (1981)	"It's High Time" (1981)	"You're Not Easy to Forget" (1982)

"It's High Time" is a song written by Randy Goodrum and Brent Maher, and recorded by American country music artist Dottie West. It was released in October 1981 as the first single from the album High Times.

Although this song wasn't one of her highest-charting singles, it was noteworthy as West's final Top 20 hit on the Country charts. Since 1978, West had been on top of her career, after it had been revitalized by Kenny Rogers with a string of hit duets between 1978 and 1979 like, "Every Time Two Fools Collide" and "All I Ever Need Is You". She then went out on her own in the early 1980s, with a pair of number 1 hits, "A Lesson in Leavin'" and "Are You Happy Baby", along with a couple minor hits in between.

The song peaked at number 16 on the Country charts and became West's last significant hit, but certainly not her last Top 40 hit. Soon enough, after this hit song, her popularity would decrease dramatically, as a new wave of traditional country singers moved into Nashville in 1985.

== Chart performance ==
Chart (1981–1982)	Peak position
US Hot Country Songs (Billboard)	16
Canadian RPM Country Tracks	31
