= What Are We Doin' in Love =

Single by Dottie West and Kenny Rogers

from the album Wild West
- B-side: "Choosin' Means Losin'"
- Released: March 1981
- Studio: Creative Workshop (Berry Hill, Tennessee)
- Genre: Country pop
- Length: 2:57
- Label: Liberty
- Songwriter: Randy Goodrum
- Producers: Brent Maher, Randy Goodrum

Dottie West singles chronology
| "Are You Happy Baby?" (1980) | "What Are We Doin' in Love" (1981) | "(I'm Gonna) Put You Back on the Rack" (1981) |

Kenny Rogers singles chronology
| "Lady" (1980) | "What Are We Doin' in Love" (1981) | "I Don't Need You" (1981) |

"What Are We Doin' in Love" is a song written by Randy Goodrum and recorded by American country music artist Dottie West. Although not credited on the single release, the song also features American country and pop recording artist Kenny Rogers. It was released in March 1981 as the second single from the album Wild West. The song was West and Rogers' third and final number one on the country chart.

== Background ==
Since 1978, West and Rogers had been together as a duet partnership. Rogers revived West's career when their song "Every Time Two Fools Collide" became a hit in 1978. They became one of the most successful duet partnerships. However, in 1980, both went their separate ways to become solo artists again. The song was West's only top 40 pop hit after a few modestly charting solo records on the Billboard Hot 100. The single proved to be the final Rogers and West recorded duet, although they did occasionally perform together in later years on stage.

== Charts ==
=== Weekly charts ===
"What Are We Doin' in Love" became a crossover hit for the two, reaching number 14 on the Top 40 as well as number 7 on the Adult Contemporary charts.

| Chart (1981) | Peak position |
|---|---|
| US Hot Country Songs (Billboard) | 1 |
| US Billboard Hot 100 | 14 |
| US Adult Contemporary (Billboard) | 7 |
| Canadian RPM Country | 3 |
| Canadian RPM Adult Contemporary | 9 |

=== Year-end charts ===
| Chart (1981) | Rank |
|---|---|
| U.S. Billboard Hot 100 | 55 |
