= High Times (Dottie West album) =

Studio album by Dottie West
- Released: November 1981
- Recorded: July 1981
- Studio: Creative Workshop (Nashville, Tennessee)
- Genre: Country pop
- Label: Liberty
- Producer: Brent Maher, Randy Goodrum

Dottie West chronology
Wild West (1981)	High Times (1981)	Full Circle (1982)

High Times is a studio album by American country music singer Dottie West, released in 1981.

This album was built around the title track, "It's High Time". The single was released in early 1982 and reached No. 16 on the Billboard Country music charts, West's last Top 20 hit of her career. Another single from the album was also released, entitled "You're Not Easy to Forget", which reached No. 26 on the Billboard Country charts and No. 19 on the Cashbox Country charts. Other songs on the album focus on the more popular country-pop style. The album only hit No. 43 on the Top Country Albums chart.

== Track listing ==
All tracks composed by Randy Goodrum and Brent Maher, except where indicated.

1. "It's High Time"
2. "There's Nobody Like You" (Roger Miller)
3. "Without You" (Tom Evans, Pete Ham)
4. "Cajun Rage"
5. "You and I"
6. "Starting Today, Starting Over" (Johnny Slate, Larry Keith, Jim Hurt)
7. "Watch You Watch Me"
8. "Something's Missing"
9. "You're Not Easy to Forget" (Cynthia Weil, Tom Snow)
10. "Don't Be Kind" (Peter Thom, Phil Galdston)

== Chart performance ==
=== Album ===
Chart (1981)	Peak position
U.S. Billboard Top Country Albums	43

=== Singles ===
Year	Single	Peak positions	
Year	Single	US Country	CAN Country
1981	"It's High Time"	16	31
1982	"You're Not Easy to Forget"	26	—
