= When It's Just You and Me (song) =

Single by Dottie West

from the album When It's Just You and Me
- B-side: "We Love Each Other"
- Released: October 1976
- Studio: Jack Clement Recording (Nashville, Tennessee)
- Genre: Country, country pop
- Length: 3:05
- Label: United Artists
- Songwriter: Kenny O'Dell

Dottie West singles chronology
"I'm a Fool for Lovin' You" (1976)	"When It's Just You and Me" (1976)	"Every Word I Write" (1977)

"When It's Just You and Me" is a written by Kenny O'Dell, and recorded by American country music artist Dottie West. It was released in October 1976 as the first single and title track from the album When It's Just You and Me.

This song is important because it marked the first single released by West under her new record company, United Artists. Her material was now more sexual and riskier material, and this was her first single that proved this. her material now was more aimed towards country pop sounding material. The song was released in late 1976, and brought West back as a Country singer, after a rapid downfall of chart success between the years of 1975 and 1976 under RCA (which eventually dropped her from their label because of it). This song brought West back into the Top 20, at No. 19 on Billboard's list. On Cashbox's list, the single hit the Top 10, peaking at No. 10, her first Top 10 hit since 1974.

In 1977 and album of the same name was released, which featured three other singles, two of which became Top 40 Country hits, "Every Word I Write" (1977), and "Tonight You Belong to Me" (1977). This song set the stage for a string of Country/Pop-styled hits West would have until 1985.

== Chart performance ==
Chart (1976)	Peak position
US Hot Country Songs (Billboard)	19
Canadian RPM Country Tracks	12
