= Here Comes My Baby (album) =

Studio album by Dottie West
- Released: June 1965
- Recorded: 1963–1965
- Studio: RCA Studio B (Nashville, Tennessee)
- Genre: Country; Nashville Sound
- Label: RCA Victor
- Producer: Chet Atkins

Dottie West chronology
Here Comes My Baby (1965)	Dottie West Sings (1965)

Singles from Here Comes My Baby
- 1. "Here Comes My Baby" Released: June 1964; 2. "Didn't I" Released: November 1964

Here Comes My Baby is a studio album by American country music artist Dottie West. It was released in June 1965 on RCA Victor Records and was produced by Chet Atkins. It was West's debut studio album as a recording artist and was issued following the success of the title track in 1964. The latter song won a Grammy Award in early 1965 which prompted the issue of the album. Here Comes My Baby would start a series of studio recordings West would release for RCA.

== Background and content ==
Here Comes My Baby was recorded in several studio sessions between 1963 and 1965. They were held at the RCA Victor Studio located in Nashville, Tennessee. Chet Atkins served as the album's producer and would remain in collaboration with West throughout the 1960s. Atkins had recently signed her to RCA following Jim Reeves' recommendation. Reeves had recorded a song by West that became a hit in 1963. Atkins was impressed by West's own singing, signing her to the roster and first recorded her voice in February 1963. In those first sessions, West recorded a cover of Willie Nelson's "Touch Me", which appears on "side two" of the record. Another album track from the early sessions is the song "Didn't I". The original version went unreleased until it was re-recorded several months later.

Here Comes My Baby consisted of 12 tracks. Five of the album's tracks were written or co-written by West. Her husband, Bill West, co-wrote tracks with her and also played steel guitar on the recording sessions. The album also included cover versions of songs previously recorded by other artists. Among these songs is another Willie Nelson tune entitled "Night Life". The song would later be cut by Ray Price before West's version appeared as the album's second track on "side one" of the LP. The sixth track on side A was a cover of Hank Williams' "No One Will Ever Know". Also included is a song written by Roy Acuff called "All the World Is Lonely Now".

== Release and reception ==
Although signed to the RCA Victor label in 1963, the label did not release Here Comes My Baby until 1965. West's first RCA single to become a hit was a duet with Jim Reeves. However, the song did not appear on this album. The first single released for the album's preparation was "Touch Me" in April 1963. The song did not chart any major recording publications, delaying the album's release date. The title track was the song that prompted the LP's release. Issued as a single in June 1964, the song spent 15 weeks on the Billboard Hot Country Singles chart before peaking at number ten in September. The title track became West's first major hit as a solo artist and won her the first Grammy Award to be given to a female country recording artist. Following its success, a second single was issued. The self-penned, "Didn't I" was released in November 1964 and charted through 1965. Spending eight weeks charting, the single reached number 32 on the Billboard country survey, becoming a minor hit.

Here Comes My Baby was eventually released in June 1965 on the RCA Victor label, becoming her debut LP as a recording artist. The album was issued first as a vinyl LP with six songs included on side one and side two. In 2010, the album was released to digital retailers and the track listing remained the same as the 1965 original. It was later released in 2016 as part of a compilation. This compilation combined Here Comes My Baby and Dottie West Sings (her second LP) together in one track listing. In its initial release, Here Comes My Baby peaked at number 12 on the Billboard Top Country Albums chart in July 1965, spending 12 weeks on the list overall. Here Comes My Baby received a positive response upon its initial release in 1965. Writers for Billboard gave it a positive reception in their 1965 issue. "This is a beautifully produced package, with the enchantress' voice showcased tasteful instrumental and choral arrangements," staff writers commented.

== Track listing ==
=== Original vinyl version ===
Side one
No.	Title	Writer(s)	Length
1.	"Here Comes My Baby"	Bill West; Dottie West	2:31
2.	"Night Life"	Walt Breeland; Paul Buskirk; Willie Nelson	2:18
3.	"That's Where Our Love Must Be"	D. West	2:38
4.	"In Its Own Little Way"	B. West; D. West	2:19
5.	"Take Me as I Am (Or Let Me Go)"	Boudleaux Bryant	2:51
6.	"No One Will Ever Know"	Mel Forre; Fred Rose	2:44

Side two
No.	Title	Writer(s)	Length
1.	"Didn't I"	D. West	2:42
2.	"Mama, Kiss the Hurt Away"	B. West; D. West	2:50
3.	"Touch Me"	Nelson	2:29
4.	"Mama, You'd Have Been Proud of Me"	Hank Cochran	2:47
5.	"I Dreamed of an Old Affair"	Jimmie Davis; Bonnie Dodd; Charles Mitchell	2:39
6.	"All the World Is Lonely Now"	Roy Acuff; Mel Foree	2:22

=== Digital download version ===
Here Comes My Baby (2010)
No.	Title	Writer(s)	Length
1.	"Here Comes My Baby"	B. West; D. West	2:31
2.	"Night Life"	Breeland; Buskirk; Nelson	2:18
3.	"That's Where Our Love Must Be"	D. West	2:38
4.	"In Its Own Little Way"	B. West; D. West	2:19
5.	"Take Me as I Am (Or Let Me Go)"	Bryant	2:51
6.	"No One Will Ever Know"	Forre; Rose	2:44
7.	"Didn't I"	D. West	2:42
8.	"Mama, Kiss the Hurt Away"	B. West; D. West	2:50
9.	"Touch Me"	Nelson	2:29
10.	"Mama, You'd Have Been Proud of Me"	Cochran	2:47
11.	"I Dreamed of an Old Affair"	Davis; Dodd; Mitchell	2:39
12.	"All the World Is Lonely Now"	Acuff; Foree	2:22

== Personnel ==
All credits are adapted from the liner notes of Here Comes My Baby.

Musical personnel

- Willie Ackerman – drums
- Harold Bradley – guitar
- Kenneth Buttrey – drums
- Floyd Cramer – piano
- Ray Edenton – guitar
- Buddy Harman – drums
- The Anita Kerr Sings – background vocals
- Grady Martin – guitar
- Bob Moore – bass
- Jerry Reed – guitar
- Hargus "Pig" Robbins – piano
- Velma Smith – guitar
- Henry Strzelecki – bass
- Bill West – steel guitar
- Dottie West – lead vocals

Technical personnel

- Chet Atkins – producer
- Anita Kerr – arrangement

== Chart performance ==
Chart (1965)	Peak position
US Top Country Albums (Billboard)	12

== Release history ==
Region	Date	Format	Label	Ref.
United States	July 1965	Vinyl	RCA Victor	
United States	2010	Music download	LMG	
