= Would You Hold It Against Me =

Single by Dottie West

from the album Suffer Time
- B-side: "You're the Only World I Know"
- Released: March 12, 1966
- Genre: Country, Nashville sound
- Label: RCA Victor
- Songwriters: Bill West, Dottie West

Dottie West singles chronology
"Before the Ring on Your Finger Turns Green" (1965)	"Would You Hold It Against Me" (1966)	"Mommy, Can I Still Call Him Daddy" (1966)

"Would You Hold It Against Me" is a song co-written and recorded by American country music singer Dottie West. It was released in March 1966 as the second single from the album Suffer Time. West wrote the song with her then-husband Bill.

By 1966, Dottie West's professional career in Country music was only getting started. However, two years before, West achieved her first Top 10 hit with "Here Comes My Baby". The song won West a Grammy Award for Best Female Country Vocal Performance in 1965, making West the first female Country singer to win a Grammy. However, after the success of "Here Comes My Baby", West couldn't really follow-up her success with another Top 10 hit for a while, and West never won a Grammy award again, although she would receive several later nominations.

However, 1966 was a year of great change for West. Not only did she release her highest-selling solo album of all time ("Suffer Time"), but she also released the single "Would You Hold It Against Me". The song was written by West and her husband Bill. The song was released on her new album that year, and was soon released to the Country charts.

The song became Dottie West's biggest hit of the year, peaking at number 5 on the Hot Country Songs list in 1966. The song was West's biggest hit as a solo artist that decade. "Would You Hold It Against Me" was definitely a Nashville Sound recording, with violins and other string instruments that can be heard in the background of the song.

"Would You Hold It Against Me" set the stage for a couple of other hits in the 1960s for West.

== Charts ==
Chart (1966)	Peak position
U.S. Billboard Hot Country Songs	5
