= Tonight You Belong to Me =

1926 song by Gene Austin

"To-Night You Belong To Me"

Song by Gene Austin
- B-side: "It Made You Happy When You Made Me Cry"
- Published: 1926 by C & J David Music Company, Anne-Rachel Music Corporation, Mills Music Inc.
- Released: January 14, 1927
- Recorded: December 1, 1926
- Studio: Victor Studios, New York City
- Genre: Jazz, pop vocal
- Label: Victor 20371
- Songwriters: Billy Rose; Lee David

Gene Austin singles chronology
"Bye Bye Blackbird" (1926)	"To-Night You Belong To Me" (1927)	"Ain't She Sweet" (1927)

"Tonight You Belong to Me"

Single by Patience and Prudence
- B-side: "A Smile and a Ribbon"
- Released: July 1956
- Genre: Traditional pop
- Length: 1:50
- Label: Liberty
- Songwriters: Billy Rose; Lee David
- Producer: Mark McIntyre

Patience and Prudence singles chronology
"Dreamers' Bay" (1956)	"Tonight You Belong to Me" (1956)	"You Tattletale" (1957)

"Tonight You Belong to Me" is an American popular song, written in 1926 by lyricist Billy Rose and composer Lee David. The first ever recording was made by Irving Kaufman in 1926 on Banner Records. In 1927, Gene Austin recorded it and the song became a major hit. Another popular recording during this time was by Roger Wolfe Kahn and his Orchestra.

== Other versions ==
The song was revived by Frankie Laine in 1952, and recorded again in 1956 by Patience and Prudence, whose version reached #4 on the Billboard charts; they recorded it again in 1964. It was also recorded in 1956 by Lawrence Welk with the Lennon Sisters, and by the duo of Karen Chandler and Jimmy Wakely.

In 1977, "Tonight You Belong to Me" was recorded by American country music artist Dottie West. It was released as a single, peaking at number 30 on the Billboard Hot Country Singles chart in August 1977. The song was then issued on West's 1977 studio album When It's Just You and Me.

The song was sung as a duet by Steve Martin and Bernadette Peters in the 1979 film The Jerk, with accompaniment on ukulele and cornet.

The song was covered by American rock band NRBQ on their 1980 album “Grooves in Orbit”.

On his 2011 solo album Ukulele Songs, Pearl Jam singer Eddie Vedder covered the song, featuring Cat Power.

== Usage in media ==
Patience and Prudence's version of "Tonight You Belong to Me" was used in the 2026 Indonesian film Ghost in the Cell.
