= Are You Happy Baby? =

Single by Dottie West

from the album Wild West
- B-side: "Right or Wrong"
- Released: December 13, 1980
- Genre: Countrypolitan
- Length: 3:28
- Label: Liberty
- Songwriter(s): Bob Stone
- Producer(s): Brent Maher, Randy Goodrum

Dottie West singles chronology
"Leavin's for Unbelievers" (1980)	"Are You Happy Baby?" (1980)	"What Are We Doin' in Love" (1981)

"Are You Happy Baby?" is a song written by Bob Stone, and recorded by American country music artist Dottie West. It was released in December 1980 as the first single from the album Wild West. "Are You Happy Baby?" was Dottie West's second number one hit as a solo artist.

== Other versions ==
In 1980, Johnny Contardo of Sha Na Na also released a version on his album Changeover.

== Charts ==
Chart (1980–1981)	Peak position
US Hot Country Songs (Billboard)	1
