= Jerry Bradley (music executive) =

American music executive (1940–2023)

- Born: January 30, 1940; Nashville, Tennessee, U.S.
- Died: July 17, 2023 (aged 83); Mount Juliet, Tennessee, U.S.
- Genres: Country music
- Occupation(s): Record producer and music executive
- Years active: 1965–2003
- Labels: RCA Nashville, 16th Avenue

Jerry Owen Bradley (January 30, 1940 – July 17, 2023) was an American music executive known for his role in country music. As head of RCA Records in Nashville from 1973 to 1982, Bradley was involved in the marketing and creation of the first platinum album in country music, Wanted! The Outlaws, which reached that mark in 1976. He also worked as an engineer and producer at his father’s studio, Bradley’s Barn (Country Music Hall of Fame, Source). Bradley was inducted in the Country Music Hall of Fame in 2019.

== Early life ==
Bradley was born on January 30, 1940, in Nashville, Tennessee. He was the son of Owen Bradley, who later headed the Decca Records Nashville studios (later MCA Nashville, and then part of Universal Music Group). Bradley started his high school years at Montgomery Bell Academy, but then switched to Hillsboro High School over a disagreement with Montgomery Bell and their administration. After graduation, Bradley served two years in the United States Army.

== Learning the music business ==
After his Army discharge, Bradley returned to work with his father Owen at the first Bradley's Barn recording studio in Mount Juliet, Tennessee (East of Nashville). He would learn the music business at the Forest Hills Music Studio, the official name of "Bradley's Barn", during the 1960s. While working there, Jerry observed the recording of three future Country Music Hall of Fame inductees (Brenda Lee, Loretta Lynn, and Webb Pierce). Other artists who also recorded at Bradley's Barn during the 1960s included Joan Baez, Gordon Lightfoot, Warner Mack, The Beau Brummels, and Dinah Shore. Some of those recording sessions lasted past midnight, forcing Bradley to sleep on a couch at the studios so as to be ready for the next recording session to occur at 9 a.m. the following day.

== Transition to RCA ==
While also at Bradley's Barn studio, Bradley befriended Chet Atkins of RCA Nashville (which later became part of Sony Music Group). Atkins, a record producer and head of RCA Nashville, was a creator of the Nashville Sound in the 1960s along with Bradley's father Owen. Bradley told his father about a possible job at RCA Nashville to which Owen replied, "You already have a job." Owen then advised Jerry on the RCA position: "If you aim for another position, make sure it's an opportunity to advance".

== RCA Records ==
Accepting the position as a staff assistant to Chet Atkins of RCA in 1970, Bradley assisted Atkins in communications and paperwork with RCA's main office in New York. Bradley would also assist Atkins in the recording studio. In 1973, Atkins stepped down as head of RCA Nashville following a bout with cancer, and was succeeded by Bradley. During Bradley's tenure at RCA, he played a role in the early careers of Ronnie Milsap, Dolly Parton, Charley Pride, and Alabama. The biggest role in country music Bradley would play though was in legitimizing the Outlaw movement prevalent during the 1970s, led by Waylon Jennings and Willie Nelson among others. Bradley put together previously recorded songs from Jennings, Nelson, Jessi Colter (Jennings' wife), and Tompall Glaser (the last from Polydor Records), and created the album Wanted! The Outlaws with the cover showing it in an Old West poster. Released in 1976, it was the first platinum country music album certified by the Recording Industry Association of America. Jerry Bradley conceived the concept for the album cover of What Goes Around Comes Around by Waylon Jennings. Unconcerned with the negative publicity surrounding Jennings' drug issues, Bradley stated, "A little bit of drugs was selling records for Waylon in my mind. Maybe a rebellious attitude, along with the Outlaws album, didn't hurt. I'm not trying to be mean when I say that, but the mafia didn't hurt Sinatra" (Wikipedia).

Bradley's tenure was also noted for the return of Elvis Presley to country music. Songs such as "Moody Blue" and "Way Down" hit number one on the Billboard country charts prior to Presley's 1977 death. Presley also had six posthumous top-ten hits on those same charts between 1977 and 1981, including "Guitar Man", his final #1 in 1981.

Comedian Ray Stevens recorded three albums while Bradley was in charge of RCA Nashville. Stevens' most notable album was Shriner's Convention with the title track being its most notable song, both in 1980.

== After RCA ==
After stepping down from RCA Records in 1982, Bradley would become head of the Opryland Music Group, an organization created from Gaylord Entertainment's purchase of Acuff-Rose Music in 1985. While at Opryland Music Group, he was head of 16th Avenue records which produced some of Pride's albums after he left RCA. Bradley stayed as head of Opryland Music Group until his 2003 retirement, when Sony Music Group purchased Opryland Music Group's publishing.

== Service with CMA ==
Bradley served as president of the Country Music Association (CMA) Board in 1975. He was also instrumental in the creation of Fan Fair (which later became the CMA Music Festival) and in managing the historic RCA Studio B in downtown Nashville.

== Personal life ==
Besides Bradley sharing the musical talent of his father Owen, uncle Harold was a well-known session guitarist who was part of the Nashville A-Team players. Bradley's wife Connie worked for the American Society of Composers, Authors, and Publishers (ASCAP) offices in Nashville from 1980 until her 2010 retirement and was CMA Board president in 1989. She died in March 2021. In 2022, she was posthumously honored with the ACM Icon Award at the Academy of Country Music Honors. Her grand-daughter, Lillian Grace Bradley, accepted the award on her behalf at the ceremony held at the Ryman Auditorium in Nashville, Tennessee (MusicRow, 2022; The Tennessean, 2022). Another uncle, Charlie, and a cousin, Bobby, were noted recording studio engineers. Bradley's aunt Ruby Bradley Strange was a pioneering office manager on Music Row while his sister Patsy was an executive for Broadcast Music, Inc. (BMI). His son, Clay Bradley, serves as the Vice President of Creative at BMI, a role he was appointed to in 2020 (Variety, 2020). [(Source)] He also had a daughter, Leigh. His grandson, John Bradley, works as Country A&R at Electric Feel Entertainment, a position he joined in 2024 (MusicRow, 2024) (Source).

Bradley died in Mount Juliet, Tennessee, on July 17, 2023, at the age of 83.

== Honors ==
In 2019, Bradley was inducted into the Country Music Hall of Fame, in the same year as Brooks & Dunn and Stevens. This made Bradley the third member of his family inducted into the Country Music Hall of Fame, after his father Owen (1974) and uncle Harold (2006).
