= Paper Mansions =

Single by Dottie West

from the album With All My Heart and Soul
- B-side: "Someone's Gotta Cry"
- Released: February 1967
- Recorded: July 1966
- Studio: RCA Studio B (Nashville, Tennessee)
- Genre: Country, Nashville sound
- Length: 3:01
- Label: RCA Victor
- Songwriter: Ted Harris
- Producer: Chet Atkins

Dottie West singles chronology
"What's Come Over My Baby" (1966)	"Paper Mansions" (1967)	"Like a Fool" (1967)

"Paper Mansions" is a song written by Ted Harris, recorded by American country music artist by Dottie West. The single was first a 45 RPM. It was released in February 1967 as the first single from her With All My Heart and Soul album (which sold quite well). This song was West's last Top 10 hit of the decade as a solo act. The song became a Top 10 hit in 1967, reaching No. 8 on the Hot Country Singles list on Billboard's chart. It didn't do as well on Cashbox's Country Top 50 chart, only making the Top 15 there, at No. 13.

This song is one of West's better-known hits from the 1960s. It wasn't included on any other Dottie West album until 1996, when RCA records released a compilation album of all her hits under RCA titled The Essential Dottie West. Lynn Anderson released a recording of this song on her December 1967 album Promises, Promises.

== Charts ==
Chart (1967)	Peak position
U.S. Billboard Hot Country Singles	8
U.S. Cashbox Country Top 50	13
