= Here Comes My Baby (Dottie West song) =

1964 single by Dottie West

Single by Dottie West

from the album Here Comes My Baby
- B-side: "(How Can I Face) These Heartaches Alone"
- Released: June 1964
- Recorded: February 1964
- Studio: RCA Victor Studio
- Genre: Country
- Length: 2:31
- Label: RCA Victor
- Songwriters: Bill West; Dottie West
- Producers: Chet Atkins; Bob Ferguson

Dottie West singles chronology
"Love Is No Excuse" (1964)	"Here Comes My Baby" (1964)	"Didn't I" (1965)

"Here Comes My Baby" is a song co-written and recorded by American country music artist Dottie West. It was released in June 1964 as the first single and title track from the album Here Comes My Baby. West wrote the song with her then-husband Bill.

== History ==
"Here Comes My Baby" was the first song to be written and made famous by Dottie West. In 1964, Dottie West was trying to make it big in Nashville. She released a single the previous year called "Let Me off at the Corner," which made the Top 40. She also recorded another with Jim Reeves called "Love Is No Excuse," which became a hit after his death in 1964. She had just received a recording contract with RCA Victor and decided that she would write her own song and release it as a single. The song was written in one day, according to West, who wrote along with her husband Bill West, and she then recorded it in Nashville.

Nobody expected the success the song would bring in 1964. The song made it to number 10 on the Billboard country charts that year, making the song a national hit for West. That year, West won a BMI award for writing "Here Comes My Baby." The next year, West made history when the song won her a Grammy Award for Best Female Country Vocal Performance. West not only became the first person to win this type of Grammy Award, but also became the first female country music singer to ever win a Grammy Award. (The National Academy of Recording Arts and Sciences introduced the country categories to the Grammy Awards that year.)

Because of the success of the song, West got a spot on the Grand Ole Opry in Nashville, and the song became one of West's signature songs of her career. It has been made a standard to record in country music.

== Cover versions ==
Since its original release, "Here Comes My Baby" has been recorded by over 100 artists, including Lynn Anderson from the album "Songs That Made Country Girls Famous" (1970), Dean Martin, Faron Young and a 1965 Perry Como version produced by Chet Atkins.

== Charts ==
Chart (1964)	Peak position
U.S. Billboard Hot Country Songs	10

== Anita Perras version ==
"Here Comes My Baby"

Single by Anita Perras

from the album Touch My Heart
- Released: 1990
- Genre: Country
- Length: 2:59
- Label: Savannah
- Songwriters: Dottie West; Bill West
- Producer: Mike Francis

Anita Perras singles chronology
"Touch My Heart" (1989)	"Here Comes My Baby" (1990)	"After All" (1990)

Canadian country music artist Anita Perras covered the song on her 1989 album Touch My Heart. Her version was released as a single in 1990 and peaked at number 9 on the RPM Country Tracks chart.

=== Chart performance ===
Chart (1990)	Peak position
Canada Country Singles (RPM)	9

=== Year-end charts ===
Chart (1990)	Position
Canada Country Tracks (RPM)	95
