= Johnny Reid discography =

- Studio albums: 10
- Singles: 25
- Music videos: 23

Johnny Reid is a Canadian country music artist. His discography comprises ten studio albums and twenty-five singles. Reid has sold over 11 million albums worldwide.

== Studio albums ==
=== 1990s–2000s ===
Title	Details	Peak positions	Certifications (sales threshold)
Title	Details	CAN	Certifications (sales threshold)
Another Day, Another Dime	Release date: September 15, 1997; Label: JCD; Formats: CD, cassette	—	
Johnny Reid	Release date: January 17, 2000; Label: JCD; Formats: CD, cassette	—	
Born to Roll	Release date: March 15, 2005; Label: Open Road; Formats: CD, download	—	CAN: Platinum
Kicking Stones	Release date: April 10, 2007; Label: Open Road; Formats: CD, download	21	CAN: 2× Platinum
Dance with Me	Release date: March 10, 2009; Label: Open Road; Formats: CD, music download	3	CAN: 3× Platinum
"—" denotes releases that did not chart

=== 2010s–2020s ===
Title	Details	Peak positions	Certifications (sales threshold)	Sales
Title	Details	CAN	Certifications (sales threshold)	Sales
A Place Called Love	Release date: August 31, 2010; Label: EMI; Formats: CD, download	1	CAN: 2× Platinum	CAN: 96,000
Fire It Up	Release date: March 12, 2012; Label: EMI; Formats: CD, download	2	CAN: Platinum	
What Love Is All About	Release date: November 13, 2015; Label: Universal Music Canada; Formats: CD, download	3	CAN: Platinum	CAN: 50,000
Revival	Release date: November 3, 2017; Label: Universal Music Canada; Formats: CD, download	3		
Love Someone	Release date: October 15, 2021; Label: Universal Music Canada; Formats: CD, 2×LP, download	56		

== Christmas albums ==
Title	Details	Peak positions	Certifications (sales threshold)	Sales
Title	Details	CAN	Certifications (sales threshold)	Sales
Christmas	Release date: November 10, 2009; Label: Open Road Recordings; Formats: CD, music download	7	CAN: Platinum	
A Christmas Gift to You	Release date: October 22, 2013; Label: Universal Music Canada; Formats: CD, music download	1	CAN: 2× Platinum	CAN: 106,000

== Extended plays ==
Title	Details	Peak positions
Title	Details	CAN
My Kind of Christmas	Release date: October 25, 2019; Label: Universal Music Canada; Formats: Download, streaming	18

== Singles ==
Year	Single	Peak positions			Certifications	Album
Year	Single	CAN Country	CAN	CAN AC	Certifications	Album
1999	"Given Up on Me"	45	—	—		Johnny Reid
2000	"Runnin' Wild"	50	—	—		Johnny Reid
2000	"She Don't Wanna Hear"	41	—	—		Johnny Reid
2004	"You Still Own Me"	13	—	—		Born to Roll
2005	"Sixty to Zero"	—	—	—		Born to Roll
2005	"Missing an Angel"	—	—	—		Born to Roll
2006	"Time Flies"	—	—	—		Born to Roll
2006	"Gypsy in My Soul"	12	—	—		Born to Roll
2007	"Love Sweet Love"	11	—	—		Kicking Stones
2007	"Kicking Stones"	13	—	—		Kicking Stones
2007	"Darlin'"	3	57	—	MC: Platinum	Kicking Stones
2008	"Thank You"	13	82	—		Kicking Stones
2008	"Out of the Blue"	7	80	—		Kicking Stones
2009	"A Woman Like You"	4	51	—	MC: Platinum	Dance with Me
2009	"Dance with Me"	10	66	—	MC: Platinum	Dance with Me
2009	"Old Flame"	4	85	—		Dance with Me
2010	"Today I'm Gonna Try and Change the World"	3	41	—	MC: Gold	A Place Called Love
2010	"Let's Go Higher"	5	58	8	MC: Gold	A Place Called Love
2011	"Hands of a Working Man"	35	—	—		A Place Called Love
2011	"You Gave My Heart a Home"	10	—	—		A Place Called Love
2012	"Fire It Up"	4	53	—	MC: Gold	Fire It Up
2012	"Baby I Know It"	3	76	—		Fire It Up
2012	"Dedicated to You"	19	99	22		Fire It Up
2015	"A Picture of You"	24	—	—		What Love Is All About
2015	"Honey Honey"	40	—	—		What Love Is All About
"—" denotes releases that did not chart

== Other singles ==
=== Guest singles ===
Year	Single	Peak positions	Album
Year	Single	CAN Country	Album
2010	"You Tell Me" (Terri Clark with Johnny Reid)	16	The Long Way Home

=== Other charted songs ===
Year	Single	Peak positions		Album
Year	Single	CAN Country	CAN AC	Album
2009	"Waiting for Christmas to Come"	50	42	Christmas
2010	"Jingle Bell Rock"	43	—	Christmas
2010	"Christmas Time Again"	47	—	Christmas
2013	"I Heard the Bells on Christmas Day"	—	12	A Christmas Gift to You
2013	"Winter Star"	—	13	A Christmas Gift to You
"—" denotes releases that did not chart

== Music videos ==
Year	Video	Director
2004	"You Still Own Me"	Margaret Malandruccolo
2005	"Sixty to Zero"	Shawn Maher
2005	"Missing an Angel"	Warren P. Sonoda
2006	"Time Flies"	Stephano Barberis
2007	"Love Sweet Love"	Steven Goldmann
2007	"Kicking Stones"	
2007	"Darlin'"	
2008	"Thank You"	
2008	"Silent Night"	
2009	"A Woman Like You"	
2009	"Dance with Me"	Warren P. Sonoda
2009	"Old Flame"	
2010	"Today I'm Gonna Try and Change the World"	Margaret Malandruccolo
2010	"Let's Go Higher"	Ante Kovac
2011	"Hands of a Working Man"	Joel Stewart
2011	"You Gave My Heart a Home"	
2012	"Fire It Up"	Margaret Malandruccolo
2012	"Baby I Know It" (with Carolyn Dawn Johnson)	
2012	"Dedicated to You" (remix)	John Poliquin
2014	"Go Tell It on the Mountain" (with Natalie MacMaster and The Rankins)	Margaret Malandruccolo
2015	"A Picture of You"	Lisa Mann
2016	"Honey Honey"	Lisa Mann/Daniel Grant
2016	"What Love Is All About"	
2017	"The Light In You"	
2018	"Heart Of A Woman"	
2020	"People Like You"	
2020	"A Time For Having Fun"	
