= One Day Closer to You =

Single by Carolyn Dawn Johnson

from the album Room with a View
- Released: July 20, 2002
- Genre: Country
- Length: 3:11
- Label: Arista Nashville
- Songwriter(s): Carolyn Dawn Johnson, Mary Danna
- Producer(s): Paul Worley, Carolyn Dawn Johnson

Carolyn Dawn Johnson singles chronology
"I Don't Want You to Go" (2001)	"One Day Closer to You" (2002)	"Simple Life" (2003)

"One Day Closer to You" is a song co-written and recorded by Canadian country music artist Carolyn Dawn Johnson. It was released in July 2002 as the fourth single from the album Room with a View. The song reached #24 on the Billboard Hot Country Singles & Tracks chart. The song was written by Johnson and Mary Danna.

== Chart performance ==
Chart (2002)	Peak position
US Hot Country Songs (Billboard)	24
