= Dress Rehearsal (album) =

Studio album by Carolyn Dawn Johnson
- Released: May 4, 2004
- Recorded: October 2002 – January 2004
- Genre: Country
- Length: 48:53
- Label: Arista Nashville
- Producers: Carolyn Dawn Johnson; Dann Huff

Carolyn Dawn Johnson chronology
Room with a View (2001)	Dress Rehearsal (2004)	Love & Negotiation (2006)

Singles from Dress Rehearsal
- 1. "Simple Life" Released: November 24, 2003; 2. "Die of a Broken Heart" Released: May 17, 2004; 3. "Head Over High Heels" Released: October 2004 (Canada only); 4. "Dress Rehearsal" Released: 2005

Professional ratings
Review scores
Source	Rating
AllMusic	2.5/5 stars

Dress Rehearsal is the second studio album by Canadian country music singer-songwriter Carolyn Dawn Johnson, released on May 4, 2004, via Arista Nashville, as her second and final album for the label. Johnson worked with Dann Huff for this album instead of Paul Worley.

It was received less favorably compared to her debut studio album Room with a View (2001), and was less successful commercially, only hitting number nine on the US Top Country Albums chart. Four singles were released from this album, although only two were released to the United States before Johnson left Arista Nashville due to creative differences. "Simple Life" was by far the album's most-successful single, hitting number 13 on the US Hot Country Songs chart. "Die of a Broken Heart" failed to perform well in the United States, but was a huge success on Canadian country radio, hitting number four on the Radio & Records Canada Country chart. "Head Over High Heels" and the title track also cracked the top-15 of the chart.

Dress Rehearsal would be re-released to Europe in 2005 with an alternate track listing featuring songs from both Room With a View and Dress Rehearsal. "Squeezin' the Love Outta You" was initially recorded by Redmon & Vale.

== Track listing ==
All tracks co-written by Carolyn Dawn Johnson except where noted. Co-writers are noted in the "writer(s)" column.

Dress Rehearsal track listing
No.	Title	Writer(s)	Length
1.	"Dress Rehearsal"	Troy Verges	4:17
2.	"He's Mine"	Rivers Rutherford; Verges	3:32
3.	"Simple Life" (Verges, Aimee Mayo, Chris Lindsey, Hillary Lindsey)		3:50
4.	"Die of a Broken Heart"	Shaye Smith	3:23
5.	"We Talked"	Craig Wiseman	3:45
6.	"God Doesn't Make Mistakes"	Verges	4:21
7.	"Squeezin' the Love Outta You"	Verges; Steve Mandile	3:36
8.	"Head Over High Heels"	Smith	3:15
9.	"My Little Secret"	Gordon Kennedy	3:41
10.	"Just Another Plane"	Charlie Black	4:10
11.	"Life as We Know It"	Black	3:35
12.	"I'll Let You Go"	Smith	7:28
Total length:			48:53

European track listing
No.	Title	Writer(s)	Length
1.	"Dress Rehearsal"	Johnson; Verges	4:17
2.	"He's Mine"	Johnson; Rutherford; Verges	3:32
3.	"Complicated"	Johnson; Verges	3:48
4.	"I Don't Want You to Go"	Johnson; Tommy Polk	4:39
5.	"We Talked"	Johnson; Wiseman	3:45
6.	"My Little Secret"	Johnson; Kennedy	3:41
7.	"You Are"	Johnson; Verges	5:10
8.	"Just Another Girl"	Johnson	3:34
9.	"Squeezin' the Love Outta You"	Johnson; Verges; Mandile	3:36
10.	"Head Over High Heels"	Johnson; Smith	3:15
11.	"God Doesn't Make Mistakes"	Johnson; Verges	4:21
12.	"Not Enough to Say"	Johnson; Mandile	4:46
13.	"Die of a Broken Heart"	Johnson; Smith	3:23
14.	"Room With a View"	Johnson; Chuck Jones	3:50
Total length:			55:37

== Personnel ==
- Tim Akers – keyboards
- Bruce Bouton – steel guitar
- Matt Chamberlain – drums
- J. T. Corenflos – electric guitar
- Eric Darken – percussion
- Paul Franklin – steel guitar, Dobro
- Amy Grant – background vocals
- Jim Hoke – accordion, harmonica, Jew's harp
- Wes Hightower – background vocals
- Dann Huff – acoustic guitar, electric guitar, Dobro
- Carolyn Dawn Johnson – lead vocals, background vocals, acoustic guitar
- Gordon Kennedy – acoustic guitar, electric guitar, sitar, background vocals
- Steve Mandile – background vocals
- Greg Morrow – drums
- Steve Nathan – keyboards
- John "J.R" Robinson – drums, percussion
- Keith Urban – acoustic guitar, electric guitar, soloist, background vocals
- John Willis – acoustic guitar
- Glenn Worf – bass guitar
- Jonathan Yudkin – mandolin, fiddle, violin, viola, cello

== Charts ==
Chart (2004)	Peak position
US Top Country Albums (Billboard)	9
US Billboard 200	65
