= Houghton Weavers =

English folk music band

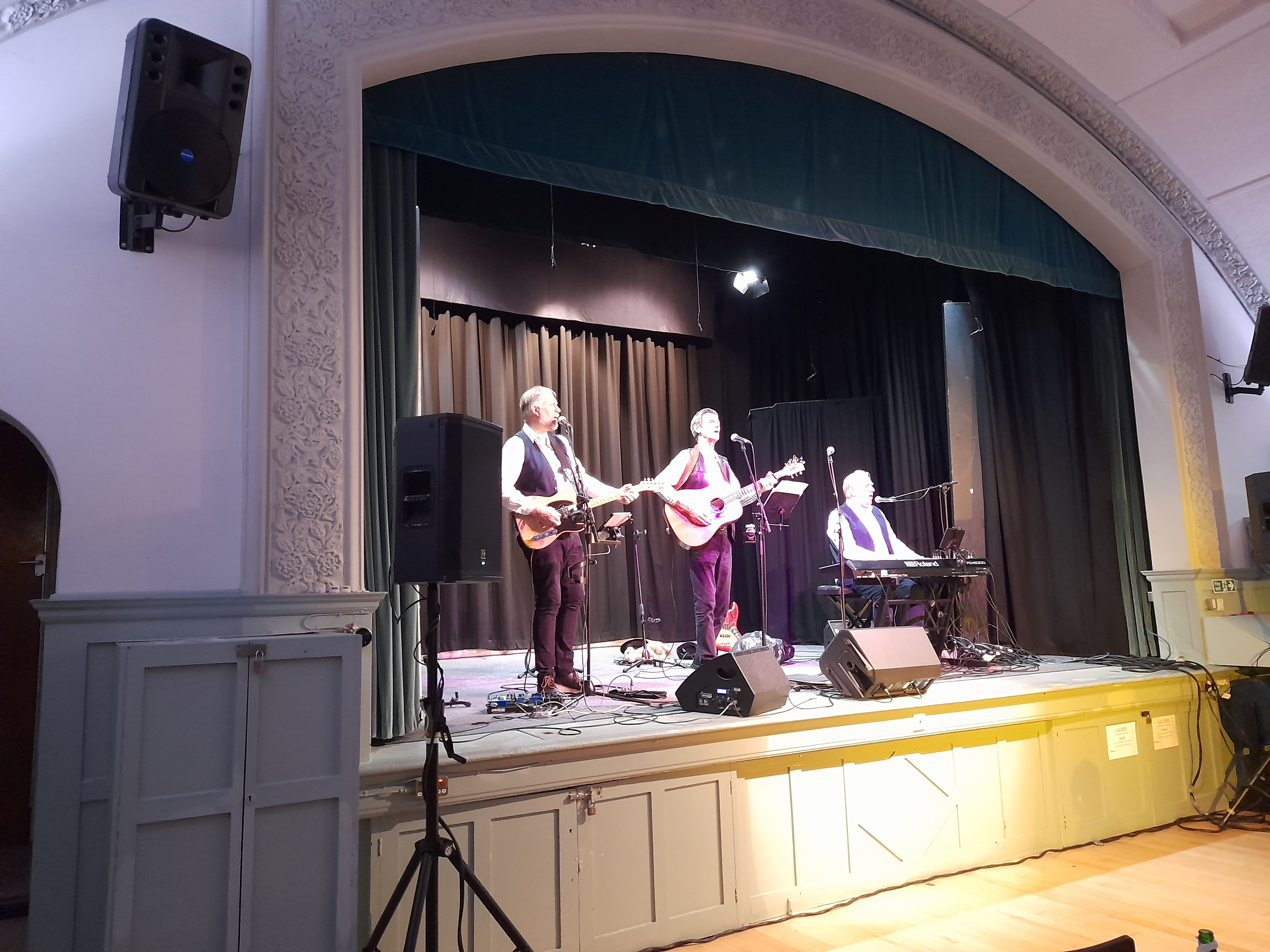
The Houghton Weavers in 2025 at Silverdale, Lancashire

The Houghton Weavers are an English folk music band formed in 1975. The band began in Westhoughton in Greater Manchester, historically part of Lancashire, England. The band members are Steve Millington (bass guitar, keyboards, acoustic guitar, piano accordion, and vocals) and Jim Berry and David Littler (guitar, harmonica, and vocals), with Peter Frampton on guitars. Millington and Frampton played together in 70's country band Poacher. Millington joined in 1996 and Berry became part of the band in 2017. Jim's brother Tony Berry had been an original member of the band and died in June 2019.

Original members of the band were Norman Prince (1975 to 1999, acoustic guitar, banjo, 12 string guitar, bass guitar, and vocals), to 1977) John Oliver (1975 to 1976, vocals), Denis Littler (1976 to 1984, bass guitar and vocals), David Littler (1975 to 2024, acoustic guitar, banjo, mandolin, banjo-ukulele, bouzouki, piano accordion, and vocals), and Tony Berry (1975 to 2019, vocals).

They sing mainly English folk music, much of it in a Lancashire dialect, as well as folk versions of easy listening hits. The group's song subjects include "The Blackpool Belle", "Uncle Joe's Mint Balls", and "The Lion of Vienna" in honour of footballer Nat Lofthouse. They are best known for their BBC TV show Sit Thi Deawn (Lancashire dialect for "have a seat", referring to the hospitality of Lancashire people). The programme ran for six series or seven years and was a mixture of easy listening music and comedy for a local audience. The group also starred in six of their own series for BBC Radio 2.

== History ==
In 2014 lead singer Tony Berry was unable to perform due to throat cancer; he attended as a sound mixer. He recovered and continued singing with the band. In June 2019, it was reported that he had died of pancreatic cancer.

== Quotations ==
- "With 'folk' you either think of something like the Houghton Weavers, or proper folk." – Andy Kershaw

== Selected discography ==
- Howfen Wakes, 1976
- Gone are the Days, 1977
- Sit Thi Deawn, 1978
- Clatter o' Clogs, 1979
- In Concert, 1979
- Up Your Way, 1980
- Alive and Kicking, 1981
- In the Rare Ould Times, 1983
- Keep Folk Smiling, 1985
- It’s Good to See You, 1986
- Lancashire Lads, 1988
- When Granny Sang Me Songs, 1990
- Christmas Collection, 1991
- The Keeper, 1992
- Work of the Weavers, 1993
- Live at the City Varieties, Leeds, 1995
- The Best of Houghton Weavers, 1995
- What a Wonderful World, 1996
- Lancashire Folk, 1997
- Glory of Love, 1998
- On the Road, 1999
- Houghton Weavers: Collection Vol. 1, 2000
- Blackpool Belle: Collection Vol. 2, 2000
- Come Landlord: Collection Vol. 3, 2001
- We Wish You a Merry Christmas, 2002
- 30th Anniversary Collection, 2004
- Howfen Wakes (Remastered), 2005
- Gone are the Days (Remastered), 2005
- Sit Thi Deawn (Remastered), 2005
- Made in Howfen (DVD), 2005
- 20 Folk Classics, 2007
- Ae Fond Kiss, 2009
- At Home with The Weavers (DVD), 2010
- Lancashire Leads the Way, 2010
- Songs of Conflict, 2012
- In Session at the Carnegie Hall (DVD), 2012
- By Request, 2014
- Christmas in Lancashire, 2016
- Some of the Best, 2017
- New World in the Morning, 2022
