= A Woman Like You =

A Woman Like You may refer to:

- A Woman Like You (1933 film), a German comedy film
- A Woman Like You (1939 film), a German romance film
- "A Woman Like You" (Johnny Reid song), 2009
- "A Woman Like You" (Lee Brice song), 2011
