= Born to Roll =

Born to Roll may refer to:

- Born to Roll (album), an album by Johnny Reid
- "Born to Roll" (song), a song by Masta Ace Incorporated
