= Love Rules =

Love Rules may refer to:

- "Love Rules", a song by Don Henley for soundtrack of 1982 American film Fast Times at Ridgemont High
- Love Rules!, 2004 American ABC Family comedy film
- Love Rules (album), 2010 album by Carolyn Dawn Johnson
