= Die of a Broken Heart =

Single by Carolyn Dawn Johnson

from the album Dress Rehearsal
- Written: 2004
- Released: May 17, 2004
- Genre: Country
- Length: 3:23 (album version); 3:15 (radio edit)
- Label: Arista Nashville
- Songwriters: Carolyn Dawn Johnson; Shaye Smith
- Producers: Carolyn Dawn Johnson; Dann Huff

Carolyn Dawn Johnson singles chronology
"Simple Life" (2004)	"Die of a Broken Heart" (2004)	"Head Over High Heels" (2004)

"Die of a Broken Heart" is a song by Canadian singer-songwriter Carolyn Dawn Johnson. Johnson co-wrote the song with Shaye Smith and co-produced with Dann Huff. It was released as the second single from Johnson's sophomore studio album Dress Rehearsal (2004) on May 17, 2004, via Arista Nashville. Although a commercial failure in the United States, it proved to be a success in her home country of Canada, hitting the top-ten of the Radio & Records Canada Country airplay chart.

== Content ==
"Die of a Broken Heart" speaks of a female narrator dreaming of a final wish, which is that her partner doesn't let her die "of a broken heart," as it is a pain she cannot withstand.

== Critical reception ==
Deborah Evans Price of Billboard gave the single a positive review, saying "Johnson delivers the lyric with such tenderness and vulnerability that a listener cannot help but be drawn in [...] Johnson turns it into a poignant look at heartbreak–something most people can relate to."

== Chart performance ==
"Die of a Broken Heart" entered the US Billboard Hot Country Songs chart the week of June 12, 2004, at number 60. The following week, the single rose to its peak position of number 52, becoming Johnson's first single to miss the top-forty and was also her last entry on the chart to date. It fell to number 56 the following week before ultimately ending at number 58. On Radio & Records's country airplay chart for the United States, the track did not perform any better

The song did perform far better in Johnson's home country of Canada, debuting at number 21 on the Radio & Records Canada Country chart the week of May 21, 2004, at number 21. It reached the top-ten of the chart the week of June 11, 2004, at number seven. It rose to number six the following week. "Die of a Broken Heart" would ultimately hit number four on the chart the week of July 23, 2004. It would overall spend 19 weeks on the chart, its last being on September 24, 2004, at number 30.

== Charts ==
=== Weekly charts ===
Chart (2004)	Peak position
Canada Country (Radio & Records)	4
US Hot Country Songs (Billboard)	52

=== Year-end charts ===
2004 year-end chart performance for "Die of a Broken Heart"
Chart (2004)	Position
Canada Country (Radio & Records)	7
