= Room with a View (album) =

Studio album by Carolyn Dawn Johnson
- Released: August 7, 2001
- Genre: Country
- Length: 45:33 (American version); 54:08 (Canadian version)
- Label: Arista Nashville
- Producers: Paul Worley; Carolyn Dawn Johnson

Carolyn Dawn Johnson chronology
Room with a View (2001)	Dress Rehearsal (2004)

Singles from Room with a View
- 1. "Georgia" Released: September 4, 2000; 2. "Complicated" Released: April 9, 2001; 3. "I Don't Want You to Go" Released: December 10, 2001; 4. "One Day Closer to You" Released: July 20, 2002

Professional ratings
Review scores
Source	Rating
AllMusic	3/5 stars
Billboard	(positive)

Room with a View is the debut studio album by Canadian country music artist and songwriter Carolyn Dawn Johnson, released on August 7, 2001, via Arista Nashville.

and was released on August 7, 2001, on Arista Nashville. Certified gold by the CRIA, it produced the singles "Georgia", "Complicated", "I Don't Want You to Go", and "One Day Closer to You".

== Track listing ==
All tracks written by Carolyn Dawn Johnson, co-writers are noted.

Standard edition
No.	Title	Writer(s)	Length
1.	"Georgia"	Troy Verges	4:53
2.	"Just Another Girl"		3:34
3.	"I'll Think of You That Way"	Marc Beeson	3:44
4.	"Love Is Always Worth the Ache"	Tommy Polk	3:52
5.	"Complicated"	Shaye Smith	3:48
6.	"I Don't Want You to Go"	Polk	4:39
7.	"You Are"	Verges	5:10
8.	"Masterpiece"	Kye Fleming; Mary Ann Kennedy	4:04
9.	"Little Bit of This, Little Bit of That"	Al Anderson; Kim Carnes	4:48
10.	"One Day Closer to You"	Mary Danna	3:11
11.	"Room with a View"	Chuck Jones	3:50
Total length:			45:33

Canadian edition
No.	Title	Writer(s)	Length
12.	"Tumble and Roll"	Carnes; Anderson	3:49
13.	"Not Enough to Say"	Steve Mandle	4:46
Total length:			54:08

== Personnel ==
Compiled from liner notes.

Musicians

- Al Anderson – acoustic guitar (9, 10), electric guitar (9)
- Matraca Berg – background vocals (9)
- Steve Brewster – drum programming (2, 7)
- Kim Carnes – background vocals (9)
- Matt Chamberlain – drums (2, 7)
- Joe Chemay – bass guitar (3–5)
- J. T. Corenflos – electric guitar (2–7)
- Dan Dugmore – Dobro (2)
- Paul Franklin – steel guitar (1, 2, 6–8, 11)
- John Hobbs – keyboards (1, 8–11), Hammond B-3 organ (1, 9), piano (8, 10), synthesizer (11)
- Dann Huff – electric guitar (3–7)
- Mary Ann Kennedy – background vocals (8)
- Carolyn Dawn Johnson – lead vocals, background vocals, acoustic guitar (3, 6, 7, 11)
- John Jorgenson – electric guitar (1, 11), 12-string guitar (8)
- Tim Lauer – accordion (1)
- B. James Lowry – acoustic guitar (2, 7)
- Martina McBride – background vocals (1)
- Terry McMillan – percussion (1, 3–6, 8, 11)
- Steve Mandile – electric guitar (1, 6, 7, 10), acoustic guitar (6, 8)
- Steve Nathan – keyboards (2–7), Hammond B-3 organ (2, 4, 6), piano (3)
- Greg Morrow – drums (1, 3–6, 8–11), percussion (8, 9, 10)
- Curt Ryle – acoustic guitar (3–5)
- Jason Sellers – background vocals (7)
- Marty Stuart – mandolin (10)
- Biff Watson – acoustic guitar, bouzouki (4), 12-string guitar (9)
- Glenn Worf – bass guitar (except 3–5)
- Paul Worley – acoustic guitar (1, 3, 7, 8, 11), 12-string guitar (1, 2)
- Jonathan Yudkin – fiddle (5–7)

Technical

- Eric Conn – digital editing
- Paige Connors – production coordination
- Carlos Grier – digital editing
- Carolyn Dawn Johnson – production
- Mike Poole – recording
- Denny Purcell – mastering
- Clarke Schleicher – recording, mixing
- Paul Worley – production

== Charts ==
=== Weekly charts ===
Chart (2001)	Peak position
US Billboard 200	87
US Top Country Albums (Billboard)	8

=== Year-end charts ===
Chart (2001)	Position
Canadian Country Albums (Nielsen SoundScan)	16
US Top Country Albums (Billboard)	60
Chart (2002)	Position
Canadian Country Albums (Nielsen SoundScan)	54
US Top Country Albums (Billboard)	54
