= David Rogers (country singer) =

American singer-songwriter

David Rodgers
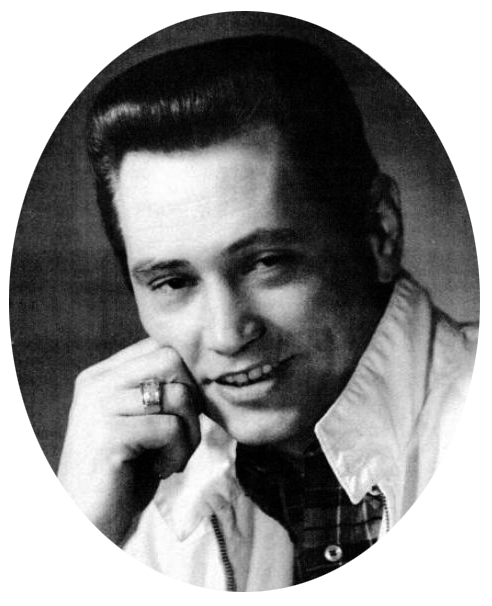
- David Rodgers in 1968

Background information
- Born: March 27, 1936; Atlanta, Georgia, United States
- Died: August 10, 1993 (aged 57)
- Genre: Country
- Occupation: Singer
- Instruments: Vocals, guitar
- Years active: 1967–1993
- Labels: Columbia, Atlantic, United Artists, Republic, Kari, Music Master, Mr. Music, Hal Kat

David Rodgers (March 27, 1936 – August 10, 1993) was an American country music artist. Between 1968 and 1984, Rodgers charted thirty-seven singles on the Billboard Hot Country Songs chart, reaching Top Ten with the hits, "Need You" and "Loving You Has Changed My Life," both at No. 9. In the same timespan, he recorded several studio albums on the Columbia, Atlantic and United Artists labels.

He has three known grandchildren. Stevenne Rodgers, Randell Trice and Danielle Rodgers.

== Biography ==
David Rodgers was born March 27, 1936, in Atlanta, Georgia, United States. He began playing guitar at age eleven, and by age twenty, had been offered a chance to join Roger Miller's band, but declined as he had been drafted. After leaving the services, Rodgers performed at the Egyptian Ballroom for several years, and was eventually discovered by representatives of Columbia Records, who signed him in 1967. Although his first release, "Forbidden Fruit," did not make the chart, he made his debut on the Grand Ole Opry that year. He first charted in 1968 with "I'd Be Your Fool Again," which spent five weeks on the Billboard country singles chart and peaked at No. 69. By 1970, he released his debut album, A World Called You. She Don't Make Me Cry followed in 1971, producing his first Top 20 hit in its title track, while 1972's Need You brought him to No. 9 with its title track.

In 1973, Rodgers moved to Atlantic Records, recording Just Thank Me and Hey There Girl. The latter accounted for his only other Top Ten in "Loving You Has Changed My Life," also at No. 9. 1975's Whole Lotta Livin' in a House was issued on the United Artists label, producing only a No. 60 in its title track. Later on, he recorded Lovingly for Republic Records, as well as several more non-album singles. Rodgers continued to tour the United States and United Kingdom, in addition to charting on the Music Master, Mr. Music and Hal Kat labels.

Rodgers died on August 10, 1993.

== Discography ==
=== Studio albums ===
Year	Album details	Peak positions
Year	Album details	US Country
1970	A World Called You: Release date: 1970; Label: Columbia Records	—
1971	She Don't Make Me Cry: Release date: 1971; Label: Columbia Records	—
1972	Need You: Release date: 1972; Label: Columbia Records	43
1973	Just Thank Me: Release date: 1973; Label: Atlantic Records	36
1973	Farewell to the Ryman: Release date: 1973; Label: Atlantic Records	28
1974	Hey There Girl: Release date: 1974; Label: Atlantic Records	31
1975	Whole Lotta Livin' in a House: Release date: 1975; Label: United Artists Records	—
1978	Lovingly: Release date: 1978; Label: Republic Records	—

=== Singles ===
Year	Single	Peak chart positions		Album
Year	Single	US Country	CAN Country	Album
1967	"Forbidden Fruit"	—	—	A World Called You
1968	"I'd Be Your Fool Again"	69	—	A World Called You
1968	"I'm in Love with My Wife"	38	—	A World Called You
1968	"You Touched My Heart"	37	—	A World Called You
1969	"Dearly Beloved"	59	—	single only
1969	"A World Called You"	23	—	A World Called You
1970	"So Much in Love with You"	46	—	A World Called You
1970	"I Wake Up in Heaven"	26	—	She Don't Make Me Cry
1971	"She Don't Make Me Cry"	19	9	She Don't Make Me Cry
1971	"Ruby, You're Warm"	21	16	single only
1972	"Need You"	9	9	Need You
1972	"Goodbye"	38	—	Need You
1972	"All Heaven Breaks Loose"	35	—	single only
1973	"Just Thank Me"	17	18	Just Thank Me
1973	"It'll Be Her"	22	16	Just Thank Me
1974	"Loving You Has Changed My Life"	9	21	Hey There Girl
1974	"Hey There Girl"	21	42	Hey There Girl
1974	"I Just Can't Help Believin'"	59	—	Hey There Girl
1975	"It Takes a Whole Lot of Livin' in a House"	60	—	Whole Lotta Livin' in a House
1976	"Whispers and Grins"	66	—	singles only
1976	"Mahogany Bridge"	84	—	singles only
1977	"I'm Gonna Love You Right Out of This World"	21	38	singles only
1977	"The Lady and the Baby"	76	—	singles only
1977	"I Love What My Woman Does to Me"	49	33	singles only
1977	"Do You Hear My Heart Beat"	47	—	Lovingly
1977	"You and Me Alone"	24	—	Lovingly
1978	"I'll Be There (When You Get Lonely)"	22	—	Lovingly
1978	"Let's Try to Remember"	32	—	Lovingly
1978	"When a Woman Cries"	31	—	singles only
1979	"Darlin'"	18	36	singles only
1979	"You Are My Rainbow"	36	—	singles only
1979	"You're Amazing"	39	—	singles only
1981	"Houston Blue"	88	—	singles only
1982	"Crown Prince of the Barroom"	92	—	singles only
1983	"Hold Me"	67	—	singles only
1983	"You've Still Got Me"	71	—	singles only
1983	"The Devil Is a Woman"	87	—	singles only
1984	"I'm a Country Song"	72	—	singles only
