= Leavin's for Unbelievers =

Single by Dottie West

from the album Special Delivery
- B-side: "Blue as I Want To"
- Released: June 1980
- Genre: Country
- Label: United Artists
- Songwriter(s): Randy Goodrum, Brent Maher
- Producer(s): Larry Butler

Dottie West singles chronology
"A Lesson in Leavin'" (1980)	"Leavin's for Unbelievers" (1980)	"Are You Happy Baby?" (1980)

"Leavin's for Unbelievers" is a song written by Randy Goodrum and Brent Maher, and recorded by American country music artist Dottie West. It was released in June 1980 as the third single from the album Special Delivery. The song peaked at number 13 on the Billboard Hot Country Singles chart. "Leavin's for Unbelievers" was the third and final single released from West's 1979 album entitled, Special Delivery.

== Chart performance ==
Chart (1980)	Peak position
US Hot Country Songs (Billboard)	13
