= Let's Go Higher (Johnny Reid song) =

Single by Johnny Reid

from the album A Place Called Love
- Released: September 20, 2010
- Genre: Country
- Length: 3:02
- Label: EMI
- Songwriters: Brent Maher; Johnny Reid
- Producer: Brent Maher

Johnny Reid singles chronology
"Today I'm Gonna Try and Change the World" (2010)	"Let's Go Higher" (2010)	"Hands of a Working Man" (2011)

"Let's Go Higher" is a song co-written and recorded by Canadian country music artist Johnny Reid. It was released in September 2010 as the second single from his 2010 album A Place Called Love. The song reached No. 58 on the Canadian Hot 100 in December 2010.

"Let's Go Higher" was nominated for Single of the Year at the 2012 Juno Awards.

== Music video ==
The music video was directed by Ante Kovac and premiered in November 2010.

== Chart performance ==
Chart (2010)	Peak position
Canada Hot 100 (Billboard)	58
Canada AC (Billboard)	8
Canada Country (Billboard)	5

== Certifications ==
Region	Certification	Certified units/sales
Canada (Music Canada)	Gold	40,000^{‡}
^{‡} Sales+streaming figures based on certification alone.
