= What Love Is All About =

Studio album by Johnny Reid
- Released: November 13, 2015
- Studio: Noble Street Studios (Toronto, Ontario)
- Genre: Country, pop
- Length: 46:27
- Label: Universal Music Canada
- Producer: Bob Ezrin

Johnny Reid chronology
A Christmas Gift to You (2013)	What Love Is All About (2015)

Singles from What Love Is All About
- 1. "A Picture of You" Released: August 14, 2015; 2. "Honey Honey" Released: October 16, 2015

What Love Is All About is the eighth studio album by Canadian country music artist Johnny Reid. It was released on November 13, 2015 via Universal Music Canada. The album includes the singles "A Picture of You" and "Honey Honey".

== Track listing ==
No.	Title	Writer(s)	Length
1.	"What Love Is All About"	Bob Ezrin, Thom Hardwell, Jason Matthews, Johnny Reid	3:56
2.	"Honey Honey"	Reid, Mark Selby, Tia Sillers	3:46
3.	"A Picture of You"	Ezrin, Reid, Selby	3:31
4.	"When the Sun Goes Down"	Ezrin, Tobias Kuhn, Reid	2:23
5.	"Is It Lonely Where Your Heart Is"	Jon Green, Reid, Phil Thornally	3:47
6.	"Out of the Rain"	Tony Joe White	3:20
7.	"What I'm Feelin' Right Now" (featuring Kardinal Offishall)	Jason Harrow, Brent Maher, Reid	4:00
8.	"The Rest of My Life"	Reid, Selby	3:39
9.	"My Heart Beats Like a Drum"	Alexander Freund, Reid	2:57
10.	"I Feel Like Goin' Home"	Charlie Rich	3:43
11.	"Shelter Me"	Tony Harrell, Reid, Kira Wilkie	3:51
12.	"No Tomorrow"	Ezrin, Freund, Reid	3:48
13.	"Tattoo of Jesus"	Reid, Kim Tribble	3:46
Total length:			46:27

== Charts ==
=== Weekly charts ===
Chart (2015)	Peak position
Canadian Albums (Billboard)	3

=== Year-end charts ===
Chart (2016)	Position
Canadian Albums (Billboard)	23

=== Singles ===
Year	Single	Peak positions
Year	Single	CAN Country
2015	"A Picture of You"	24
2015	"Honey Honey"	40

== Certifications ==
Region	Certification	Certified units/sales
Canada (Music Canada)	Platinum	80,000^{^}
^{^} Shipments figures based on certification alone.
