= Noah Gordon (singer) =

American singer-songwriter

- Born: Noah Adrian Gordon; September 19, 1971 (age 55)
- Origin: Sparta, Illinois, U.S.
- Genre: Country
- Occupation: Singer-songwriter
- Instruments: Vocals, guitar, mandolin, drums
- Years active: 1995–present
- Label: Patriot

Noah Adrian Gordon (born September 19, 1971, in Sparta, Illinois) is an American country music singer and songwriter. He had been a musician since childhood, playing mandolin and drums in his parents' band, and he began playing drums for Randy Travis at age ten.

After graduating high school, Gordon signed to Liberty Records sister label Patriot Records. There, he released his debut album I Need a Break on February 7, 1995. The album produced the single "The Blue Pages," which spent three weeks on the Billboard country charts, peaking at No. 68. Billboard gave the album a positive review, saying that its opening track "may leave you with the impression that Gordon is yet another honky-tonk pretender," but considered the other tracks to be strongly written. In January 1999, Gordon and Bryan Austin, also a former Patriot Records recording artist, founded a band called Phoenix.

Gordon has written songs for other artists, including "You Still Own Me" by Johnny Reid (also released by Emerson Drive), "You Are" by John Michael Montgomery (also released by Chad Brock) and "The Call" by Matt Kennon. He has also co-produced several of Colt Ford's albums.

== Discography ==
=== Studio albums ===
Title	Album details
I Need a Break	Release date: February 7, 1995; Label: Liberty/Patriot

=== Singles ===
Year	Single	Peak positions	Album
Year	Single	US Country	Album
1994	"The Blue Pages"	1	I Need a Break
1995	"I Need a Break"	1	I Need a Break

=== Music videos ===
Year	Video	Director
1994	"The Blue Pages"	R. Brad Murano/Steven T. Miller
1995	"I Need a Break"	Chris rogers
