= Born to Roll (album) =

Studio album by Johnny Reid
- Released: March 15, 2005
- Genre: Country
- Length: 46:58
- Label: Open Road
- Producer: Jeremy Stover

Johnny Reid chronology
Johnny Reid (2000)	Born to Roll (2005)	Kicking Stones (2007)

Born to Roll is the third studio album by the Canadian country music singer-songwriter Johnny Reid. It was released on March 15, 2005, by Open Road Recordings. "You Still Own Me", "Sixty to Zero", "Missing an Angel", "Time Flies" and "Gypsy in My Soul" were released as singles.

== Track listing ==
1. "She Calls Me Home" (Adrienne Follesé, Keith Follesé, Johnny Reid) – 4:46
2. "You Still Own Me" (Philip Douglas, Noah Gordon, Reid) – 3:40
3. "Sixty to Zero" (Reid, Jeremy Stover, Kim Tribble) – 3:53
4. "Missing an Angel" (Craig Headen, Reid) – 4:07
5. "I Promise You" (Reid, Stover) – 4:30
6. "Here I Am" (Brent Maher, Stover) – 4:08
7. "Gypsy in My Soul" (Tammy Hyler, Reid, Tribble) – 2:52
8. "You Turned It Up" (Wade Kirby, Reid, Tribble) – 3:03
9. "Wish It Was" (Reid) – 3:38
10. "Still Talkin' 'Bout You" (James House, Reid, Nick Trevisick) – 3:48
11. "Time Flies" (Frank McKinlay, Cyril Rawson, Reid) – 4:13
12. "Born to Roll" (Reid, Stover) – 4:11

== Personnel ==
- Richard "Spady" Brannan – bass guitar
- Steve Brewster – drums, percussion
- Tom Bukovac – electric guitar
- Larry Franklin – fiddle, mandolin
- Noah Gordon – background vocals
- Tommy Harden – drums
- Tony Harrell – accordion, Hammond B-3 organ, piano, synthesizer strings
- Doug Kahan – bass guitar
- Yvan Petit – electric guitar
- Johnny Reid – acoustic guitar, piano, lead vocals, background vocals
- Michael Spriggs – acoustic guitar
- Russell Terrell – background vocals
- Jonathan Yudkin – fiddle, mandolin
