= A Lesson in Leavin' =

1980 single by Dottie West

Single by Dottie West

from the album Special Delivery
- B-side: "Love's So Easy for Two"
- Released: February 1980
- Genre: Country pop
- Length: 3:02
- Label: United Artists
- Songwriters: Randy Goodrum; Brent Maher
- Producers: Randy Goodrum; Brent Maher

Dottie West singles chronology
"You Pick Me Up (And Put Me Down)" (1979)	"A Lesson in Leavin'" (1980)	"Leavin's for Unbelievers" (1980)

"A Lesson in Leavin'", also titled as "Lesson in Leavin"', is a song written by Randy Goodrum and Brent Maher. It was originally recorded in 1979 by American country music singer, Dottie West, for her Special Delivery album.

Following several hit duets with Kenny Rogers including three chart-toppers, as well as many more years of solo chart action, including her top five smash "Country Sunshine" the song went to No. 1 on the Billboard Country Chart in 1980, giving West her first solo chart topper. In 1999, it was re-recorded by American country music singer, Jo Dee Messina, whose version spent seven weeks at No. 2 on the same chart. Messina recorded the song as a tribute to West who died in 1991.

== Content ==
Both versions of "A Lesson in Leavin'" are set at a mid-beat tempo. The song discusses how a woman is angry that her male lover has left her. She hopes that the man's next lover treats him the way the woman was treated, saying that he will be given "a lesson in leavin'."

== Dottie West version ==
Dottie West was the first singer to release the song as a single and titled it "A Lesson in Leavin'". West's version was recorded in country pop style that was apparent on most her singles in the 1980s. West's version peaked at No. 1 on the Hot Country Singles & Tracks chart the week of April 26, 1980, and was her first No. 1 hit as a solo artist, along with another No. 1 single shortly afterwards titled, "Are You Happy Baby?." In addition the single was reached No. 73 on the Billboard Hot 100 and was a minor hit on the Hot Adult Contemporary Tracks chart. The song helped to revitalize West's career, after having a series of unsuccessful solo singles in the 1970s. The song helped West endure popularity during the early 1980s.

=== Weekly charts ===
Chart (1980)	Peak position
US Hot Country Songs (Billboard)	1
US Billboard Hot 100	73
US Adult Contemporary (Billboard)	42
Canadian RPM Country Tracks	23

=== Year-end charts ===
Chart (1980)	Position
US Hot Country Songs (Billboard)	16

== Jo Dee Messina version ==
"Lesson in Leavin'"

Single by Jo Dee Messina

from the album I'm Alright
- Released: April 26, 1999
- Genre: Country
- Length: 3:40
- Label: Curb
- Songwriters: Randy Goodrum; Brent Maher
- Producers: Byron Gallimore; Tim McGraw

Jo Dee Messina singles chronology
"Stand Beside Me" (1998)	"Lesson in Leavin'" (1999)	"Because You Love Me" (1999)

Jo Dee Messina released a cover of West's original "A Lesson in Leavin'", but retitled the song, "Lesson in Leavin'". The song was released in 1999 as the fourth single from Messina's second album, 1998's I'm Alright. The song was a major hit in 1999, spending seven weeks at No. 2 on the Billboard Hot Country Singles & Tracks chart that summer, blocked from the top spot by Lonestar's "Amazed".

=== Weekly charts ===
"Lesson in Leavin'" debuted at number 56 on the U.S. Billboard Hot Country Singles & Tracks for the week of May 1, 1999.

Chart (1999)	Peak position
Canada Country Singles (RPM)	2
US Billboard Hot 100	28
US Hot Country Songs (Billboard)	2

=== Year-end charts ===
Chart (1999)	Position
Canada Country Tracks (RPM)	44
US Billboard Hot 100	93
US Country Songs (Billboard)	3

=== Certifications ===
Certifications for Lesson In Leavin
Region	Certification	Certified units/sales
United States (RIAA)	Gold	500,000^{‡}
^{‡} Sales+streaming figures based on certification alone.

== Other versions ==
Sierra Ferrell and Nikki Lane released an acoustic cover of "A Lesson In Leavin'" in July 2025 via Rounder Records, with an accompanying live video recorded at Nashville's Sound Emporium.
