= Special Delivery (Dottie West album) =

Studio album by Dottie West
- Released: November 1979
- Recorded: July–September 1979
- Studio: Creative Workshop (Nashville, Tennessee); Jack Clement Recording (Nashville, Tennessee)
- Genre: Country; country pop; country-soul; pop
- Label: Liberty; United Artists
- Producer: Larry Butler; Randy Goodrum; Brent Maher

Dottie West chronology
Classics (1979)	Special Delivery (1979)	Wild West (1981)

Singles from Special Delivery
- 1. "You Pick Me Up and Put Me Down" Released: October 1979; 2. "A Lesson in Leavin'" Released: February 1980; 3. "Leavin's for Unbelievers" Released: June 1980

Special Delivery is a studio album by American country artist Dottie West. It was released by both Liberty Records and United Artists Records in November 1979. The album was released following a successful commercial comeback in West's career. Its new country pop production style was considered a departure from her previous recordings. The project consisted of ten tracks, six of which were composed by producers Randy Goodrum and Brent Maher. Three of the tracks were singles, including West's first solo chart-topper "A Lesson in Leavin'". Special Delivery reached the top 20 of the US country chart and was among her longest-running albums on the country survey

== Background ==
Dottie West first found country success in the 1960s, recording self-composed songs that were considered to be both "plaintive" and "heart-wrenching". After recording the 1973 single "Country Sunshine", West found crossover pop success. In 1976, she moved to United Artists Records and had a top 20 single with "When It's Just You and Me". West's career was elevated higher with several chart-topping duet singles with Kenny Rogers. Her solo singles between 1977 and 1978 made lower chart positions. This prompted West to make changes in career, beginning with a management shift in the late 1970s. West then chose Brent Maher and Randy Goodrum to help change her musical production.

== Recording and content ==
Special Delivery was recorded at both the Creative Workshop and the Jack Clement Recording Studio. Both studios were located in Tennessee. The album was cut in sessions held between July and September 1979. Randy Goodrum and Brent Maher produced the majority of the project while Larry Butler was brought in to help with some of the production. The album was considered "a departure" from West's previous studio releases because it relied on pop production. The album's production was also said to embed the styles of country pop and country-soul.

In an interview with Billboard magazine, West explained why the album's sound shifted: "Kenny [Rogers] draws very sophisticated and contemporary fans, and I had to change my style to fit with him. The album is finally reflecting these changes." Special Delivery consisted of ten tracks. Six of its songs were co-written by Goodrum and Maher. This included the disc's lead single "You Pick Me Up (And Put Me Down)". Also included was the song "All He Did Was Tell Me Lies", which was composed by Kim Carnes. Also featured was a cover of Bob Seger's "We've Got Tonite" and Cliff Richard's "Hey Mr. Dream Maker".

== Release, critical reception and legacy ==
Professional ratings
Review scores
Source	Rating
AllMusic	3/5 stars

Special Delivery was released in November 1979 by both the Liberty and United Artists labels. It was distributed as both a vinyl LP and a cassette. Five tracks were included on either side of the discs. It was the twenty eighth studio album of West's recording career. It was given a positive review by Cashbox magazine, who took notice of West's new pop approach. They also described it as a "very listenable album". Billboard magazine described the album as "splashy". AllMusic's Tom Roland gave Special Delivery three out of five stars and commented, "With her career revitalized by the duets with Kenny Rogers, West takes a new tack. Her 'Country Sunshine' is replaced with country-funk and a touch of melancholy."

Writers have since pointed to Special Delivery as being one of the country albums that signified a pop transition within the genre. In his book, Music of the 1980s, Thomas Harrison pointed to Special Delivery as being "a significant example of how country had embraced its pop counterparts." David Cantwell of Rolling Stone later explained that the album showcased "the country-soul style of Aretha Franklin’s early hits was absorbed into mainstream country vocalizing."

== Chart performance and singles ==
Special Delivery made its debut on the US Top Country Albums chart on December 22, 1979. It was West's fourth longest-running album on the country survey, spending a total of 30 weeks. On May 31, 1980, the album reached the number 13 position. It was West's highest-charting solo album since 1973's Country Sunshine. Special Delivery spawned a total of three singles. Its lead single was "You Pick Me Up (And Put Me Down)", which was issued by United Artists in September 1979. It reached number 12 on the US Hot Country Songs chart and number 28 on the Canadian RPM Country Tracks chart. It was followed by "A Lesson in Leavin'", which United Artists issued in February 1980. The song became the first solo single in West's career to reach the number one spot, topping the US Hot Country Songs chart in April 1980. Yet, it only reached number 23 on the Canadian RPM country chart. The single was also West's third to make the US Billboard Hot 100, peaking at number 73. The third and final single was "Leavin's for Unbelievers", which United Artists issued in June 1980. It was also a top 20 US country single, peaking at number 13.

== Track listing ==
Side one
No.	Title	Writer(s)	Length
1.	"You Pick Me Up (And Put Me Down)"	Randy Goodrum; Brent Maher	2:42
2.	"A Lesson in Leavin'"	Goodrum; Maher	3:00
3.	"It's Too Late (To Love Me Now)"	Rory Bourke; Gene Dobbins; Johnny Wilson	3:40
4.	"Up So High"	Goodrum; Maher	2:45
5.	"Leavin's for Unbelievers"	Goodrum; Maher	3:28

Side two
No.	Title	Writer(s)	Length
1.	"Hey Mr. Dream Maker"	Alan Tarney; Bruce Welch	3:59
2.	"Love's So Easy for Two"	Goodrum; Maher	4:04
3.	"Blue As I Want To"	Goodrum; Maher	3:14
4.	"All He Did Was Tell Me Lies"	Kim Carnes	2:52
5.	"We've Got Tonite"	Bob Seger	4:28

== Personnel ==
All credits are adapted from the liner notes of Special Delivery.

Musical personnel

- Pete Bordonali – Mandolin
- Steve Chapman – Banjo
- Sonny Garrish – Steel guitar
- Kenny Malone – Drums, percussion
- Jon Goin – Guitar
- Dennis Good – Trombone
- Randy Goodrum – Acoustic piano, Wurlitzer electronic piano
- Shane Keister – Fender Rhodes Piano
- Sheri Kramer – Background vocals
- The Shelly Kurland Strings – Strings
- Donna McElroy – Background vocals
- George Tidwell – Trumpet
- Dottie West – Lead vocals
- Jack Williams – Bass, horn

Technical personnel

- Michael Brokaw – Management
- Bill Burks – Cover
- Randy Goodrum – Producer
- Krager & Co. – Management
- Brent Maher – Producer
- Ken Perry – Mastering
- Bergen White – String arrangements

== Chart performance ==
Chart (1979–1980)	Peak position
US Top Country Albums (Billboard)	13

== Release history ==
Region	Date	Format	Label	Ref.
Japan	November 1979	Vinyl LP	Liberty Records	
North America	November 1979	Vinyl LP; cassette	United Artists Records; Liberty Records	
South Africa	November 1979	Vinyl LP	United Artists Records; Liberty Records	
United Kingdom	November 1979	Vinyl LP	United Artists Records	
North America	circa 2020	Music download; streaming	Capitol Records Nashville	
