= Georgia (Carolyn Dawn Johnson song) =

2000 song by Carolyn Dawn Johnson

Single by Carolyn Dawn Johnson

from the album Room with a View
- B-side: "Love Is Always Worth the Ache"
- Released: September 4, 2000
- Genre: Country
- Length: 4:50
- Label: Arista Nashville
- Songwriters: Carolyn Dawn Johnson; Troy Verges
- Producers: Paul Worley; Carolyn Dawn Johnson

Carolyn Dawn Johnson singles chronology
"Georgia" (2000)	"Complicated" (2001)

"Georgia" is the debut single by Canadian country music singer Carolyn Dawn Johnson, released in September 2000 from her debut album Room with a View (2001). The song peaked at number 25 on the Billboard Hot Country Singles & Tracks chart (now Hot Country Songs) and number 98 on the Billboard Hot 100. It also reached number 4 on the Canadian RPM Country Tracks chart before the magazine ceased publication. The song was written by Johnson and Troy Verges.

It features a backing vocal from Martina McBride.

== Music video ==
The music video was directed by Brent Hedgecock and premiered in late 2000.

== Chart performance ==
"Georgia" debuted at number 74 on the U.S. Billboard Hot Country Singles & Tracks chart for the week of September 16, 2000.

Chart (2000–2001)	Peak position
Canada Country Singles (RPM)	4 (Note: "Georgia" reached number 4 when RPM ceased publication in November 2000.)
US Billboard Hot 100	98
US Hot Country Songs (Billboard)	25
