= Redmon & Vale =

American country music duo

- Origin: Nashville, Tennessee, United States
- Genre: Country
- Years active: 1997–2000
- Label: DreamWorks Nashville
- Past members: Allison Redmon; Tina Vale

Redmon & Vale was an American country music duo formed in 1997 by Allison Redmon and Tina Vale, both of whom served as vocalists. They met through a common friend, with whom they initially performed as a trio before deciding to work as a duo instead after the trio split up.

The duo released a self-titled studio album and two singles in 1999 on DreamWorks Records. The album included two singles, both of which charted on the Billboard country charts. Jeffrey B. Remz of Country Standard Time gave the album a negative review, saying that it "mine[d] the generic, overproduced field of bland pop country." A reviewer for The Technique, the student newspaper for the Georgia Institute of Technology, gave the album a more positive review, noting that the two singers seemed to focus more on harmonies than most other country groups. The album's first single, "If I Had a Nickel (One Thin Dime)" reached No. 65 on the country charts, while the second single, "Squeezin' the Love Outta You", peaked at No. 74. The latter was also recorded by Carolyn Dawn Johnson (who co-wrote it) on her 2004 album Dress Rehearsal.

== Discography ==
=== Track listing ===
No.	Title	Writer(s)	Length
1.	"Movin' On"	Tina Vale	3:40
2.	"If I Had a Nickel (One Thin Dime)"	Rick Bowles; Tom Shapiro	3:11
3.	"Pretty Pink House"	Tina Vale	3:34
4.	"Both Sides of Goodbye"	Bob Alan; Tommy Lee James	2:54
5.	"In the Name of Love"	Skip Ewing; Doug Stone	3:37
6.	"Rumors"	Tina Vale	4:05
7.	"Last Exit to Eden"	Dean McTaggart; David Tyson	4:52
8.	"Get Lost"	Sunny Russ; Cathy Majeski; Stephony Smith	3:20
9.	"Kisses Don't Lie"	Michele McCord; Austin Cunningham	3:05
10.	"I Wanna Know"	Carolyn Dawn Johnson; Troy Verges	3:40
11.	"Squeezin' the Love Outta You"	Carolyn Dawn Johnson; Troy Verges; Steve Mandile	3:30
Total length:			39:28

Track information and credits verified from Discogs, AllMusic, and the album's liner notes.

=== Singles ===
Title	Date	Chart	Peak position
"If I Had a Nickel (One Thin Dime)"	June 4, 1999	US Hot Country Songs (Billboard)	65
"Squeezin' the Love Outta You"	September 10, 1999	US Hot Country Songs (Billboard)	74
"In the Name of Love"	March 2000	—	

=== Music videos ===
Year	Video	Director
1999	"If I Had a Nickel (One Thin Dime)"	Steven Goldmann
1999	"Squeezin' the Love Outta You"	David Abbott
