= Christmas (Johnny Reid album) =

Studio album by Johnny Reid
- Released: November 10, 2009
- Studio: Metalworks (Mississauga, Ontario)
- Genre: Country
- Length: 40:09
- Label: MapleMusic

Johnny Reid chronology
Dance with Me (2009)	Christmas (2009)	A Place Called Love (2010)

Professional ratings
Review scores
Source	Rating
Allmusic	3/5 stars

Christmas is the first Christmas album by the Canadian country music artist Johnny Reid. It was released on November 10, 2009, by MapleMusic Recordings. The album contains nine Christmas classics along with the original songs "Waiting for Christmas to Come" and "Christmas Time Again".

Christmas was certified Gold by the Canadian Recording Industry Association within one day of release.

== Track listing ==
No.	Title	Writer(s)	Length
1.	"Silent Night"	Joseph Mohr, Franz Gruber	4:32
2.	"Jingle Bell Rock"	Joe Beal, Jim Boothe	2:27
3.	"I'll Be Home for Christmas"	Buck Ram, Kim Gannon, Walter Kent	3:58
4.	"The Little Drummer Boy"	Katherine K. Davis, Henry Onorati, Harry Simeone	3:28
5.	"Waiting for Christmas to Come"	Johnny Reid, Thom Hardwell	3:40
6.	"Santa Claus Is Coming to Town"	John Frederick Coots, Haven Gillespie	3:06
7.	"Christmas Time Again"	Reid, Brent Maher	3:18
8.	"Blue Christmas"	Billy Hayes, Jay W. Johnson	4:17
9.	"Run Run Rudolph"	Johnny Marks, Marvin Brodie	3:02
10.	"Mary's Boy Child"	Jester Hairston	3:22
11.	"O Holy Night"	Adolphe Adam, John Sullivan Dwight	4:59

== Personnel ==
- Eddie Bayers - drums
- Richard Bennett - bouzouki, acoustic guitar, electric guitar
- Eric Darken - percussion
- Bailey Eleazer - children's choir
- Sophie Eleazer - children's choir
- Vicki Hampton - background vocals
- Tania Hancheroff - background vocals
- Jim Hoke - harmonica, mandolin, baritone saxophone, tenor saxophone
- John Barlow Jarvis - organ, piano, Wurlitzer
- Caylor Lanius - children's choir
- Sam Levine - penny whistle
- Brent Maher - background vocals
- Joy Owings - children's choir
- Johnny Reid - lead vocals, background vocals
- Mark Selby - acoustic guitar, electric guitar
- Glenn Worf - bass guitar

== Charts ==
=== Weekly charts ===
Chart (2009)	Peak position
Canadian Albums (Billboard)	7

=== Year-end charts ===
Chart (2010)	Position
Canadian Albums (Billboard)	30

== Certifications ==
Region	Certification
Canada (Music Canada)	Platinum
