= You Pick Me Up (And Put Me Down) =

Single by Dottie West

from the album Special Delivery
- B-side: "We've Got Tonite"
- Released: October 1979
- Recorded: 1979
- Genre: Country
- Length: 2:44
- Label: United Artists
- Songwriters: Randy Goodrum and Brent Maher

Dottie West singles chronology
"'Til I Can Make It on My Own" (1979)	"You Pick Me Up (And Put Me Down)" (1979)	"A Lesson in Leavin'" (1980)

"You Pick Me Up (And Put Me Down)" is a song written by Randy Goodrum and Brent Maher, and recorded by American country music singer Dottie West. It was released in October 1979 as the first single from the album Special Delivery. The song was among a series of records showcasing West's newly adopted pop-oriented style, which became popular with fans during the early 1980s.

Prior to the success of songs like "You Pick Me Up ... ," West had been known for recording in the Nashville Sound and honky-tonk styles of country music.

== Chart performance ==
"You Pick Me Up ..." reached the top 15 on the country charts, peaking at No. 12 on the Billboard Hot Country Singles chart and No. 10 on the Cashbox chart. As West's success had declined during the mid-1970s, the song completed her comeback as a solo artist. She had a series of successful duets with Kenny Rogers in 1978 and 1979, but "You Pick Me Up ..." was her most successful solo entry since 1974's "Last Time I Saw Him".

"You Pick Me Up ..." marked the future countrypolitan-styled hits to come for West, including the follow-up, the No. 1 hit "A Lesson in Leavin'". Both songs were included on her 1980 album Special Delivery, which included two other singles.

"You Pick Me Up (And Put Me Down)" has appeared on West's most popular compilation albums, including her Greatest Hits album, released in 1992, after she died in a car accident a year earlier.

=== Chart positions ===
Chart (1979–1980)	Peak position
Canadian RPM Country Tracks	28
U.S. Billboard Hot Country Singles	12
U.S. Billboard Hot Adult Contemporary Tracks	50
