= Today I'm Gonna Try and Change the World =

Single by Johnny Reid

from the album A Place Called Love
- Released: June 7, 2010
- Genre: Country
- Length: 3:59
- Label: EMI
- Songwriters: Brent Maher; Johnny Reid
- Producer: Brent Maher

Johnny Reid singles chronology
"Old Flame" (2009)	"Today I'm Gonna Try and Change the World" (2010)	"Let's Go Higher" (2010)

"Today I'm Gonna Try and Change the World" is a song co-written and recorded by Canadian country music artist Johnny Reid. It was released in June 2010 as the first single from his 2010 album A Place Called Love. The song reached No. 41 on the Canadian Hot 100 in July 2010.

The song was nominated for best single and best songwriting at the 2011 Canadian Country Music Association Awards.

== Music video ==
The music video was directed by Margaret Malandruccolo and premiered in July 2010. It was named CMT music video of the year at the 2011 Canadian Country Music Association Awards.

== Chart performance ==
Chart (2010)	Peak position
Canada Hot 100 (Billboard)	41
Canada Country (Billboard)	3

== Certifications ==
Region	Certification	Certified units/sales
Canada (Music Canada)	Gold	40,000^{‡}
^{‡} Sales+streaming figures based on certification alone.
