= Carolyn Dawn Johnson =

Canadian singer-songwriter (born 1971)

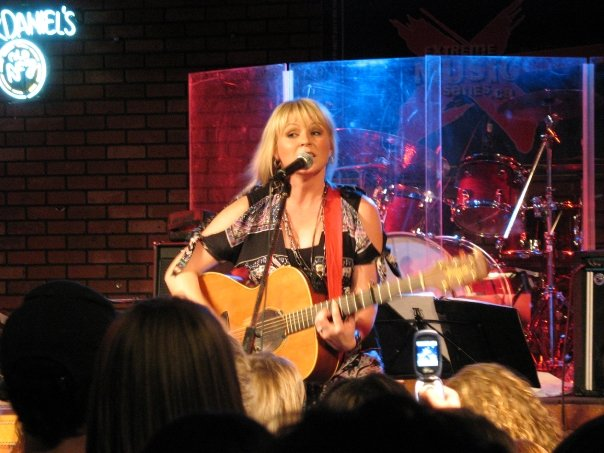
- Johnson performing in Edmonton, Alberta in 2008

Background information
- Born: April 30, 1971 (age 55); Grande Prairie, Alberta, Canada
- Genre: Country
- Occupation: Singer-songwriter
- Instruments: Vocals; acoustic guitar; piano
- Years active: 1999 – present
- Labels: Arista Nashville; Angeline; Equity; Dancing Lily Music
- Website: www.cdj.com/wired

Carolyn Dawn Johnson (born April 30, 1971) is a Canadian country music singer-songwriter. Johnson co-wrote Chely Wright's 1999 single, "Single White Female," which reached number one on the Billboard Hot Country Singles & Tracks chart in September 1999. Johnson was signed, in 2000, to record label Arista Nashville.

In 2001, Johnson released her debut album Room with a View. The album's first single "Georgia" reached No. 4 on the RPM Canadian Country Singles Chart for the week of November 6, 2000. "Complicated" was a Top Five hit on the U.S. Billboard Hot Country Singles & Tracks chart. Her next single ("I Don't Want You to Go") was a Top Ten hit in the U.S. .

== Biography ==
=== Early life and music ===
Carolyn Dawn Johnson was born in Grande Prairie, Alberta to John Johnson, a farmer and operator of a seed-cleaning business, and Loretta Johnson, a supervisor of a home for senior citizens. Johnson was raised on a farm in Deadwood, Alberta with two brothers, late older brother Derwin, who died due to an undisclosed illness on Christmas Eve in 1998, and brother Greg.

Johnson was passionate about music from a young age and even asked her mother how anyone could live without it. She sang at a church and started playing the piano at the age of five, learning from her pastor's wife, Evangeline Thiessen. Her parents played country music records by Jim Reeves and Don Williams at home and as she got older, her musical interests diversified as she listened to artists like ABBA, Charley Pride, Fleetwood Mac and Marty Stuart among others. The family later moved to Westlock, Alberta and Johnson attended RF Staples High School there. During her high school years, she learned to play the clarinet, flute and saxophone. She kept up her piano lessons largely in part due to Thiessan sending books and encouraging letters to her. Her high school teachers were not as encouraging and caused her to turn away from music for a while and turn to science, a period in her life which she called "a stain in her heart".

After graduating high school, believing that she could not make a living as a musician, Johnson attended Trinity Western University in Langley, British Columbia studying biology and a year later she was in Edmonton, Alberta studying education. During her college years, she frequently sat-in with local bands at night and encouragement from them caused her to think that maybe she could have a career in the music industry. At the age of 20, she taught herself to play the guitar and realizing that her true calling was in music, she went to Vancouver, British Columbia and there she attended Columbia Academy and learned the technical aspects of the music industry. Johnson focussed on songwriting in her spare time and ordered a video featuring songwriters from Nashville to learn more about songwriting and through this video, she joined the Nashville Songwriters Association International. In 1994, Johnson headed to Nashville after calling her mother and saying, "I'm going big. I'm going for the big picture."

=== Songwriting career ===
In Nashville, Johnson attended songwriting workshops and writer's night events. In 1997, Johnson moved permanently to Nashville after obtaining a work visa and later that year, she signed with Patrick Joseph Music as a songwriter. Her songwriting demos captured the attention of many record label executives and some of the songs she wrote were recorded by Patty Loveless, Suzy Bogguss, Kathy Mattea, Mindy McCready, Jo Dee Messina, Linda Davis and Chely Wright. Johnson's breakthrough as a songwriter came in 1999 when "Single White Female", a song she co-wrote with Shaye Smith and recorded by Wright, became a number one hit on country radio. This song became Johnson's first number one hit as a songwriter. Another one of her songs, "Downtime", recorded by Messina, also became a top five hit. In 2000, Johnson was named "Breakthrough Songwriter of the Year" by MusicRow Magazine.

=== Singing and recording career ===
In 1999, Johnson started her career as a solo artist. Her success as a songwriter led her to a record deal with the Arista Nashville record label. Paul Worley, a producer with whom Johnson was working, was also working with Martina McBride at that time and asked Johnson to sing background vocals on McBride's songs. McBride subsequently invited Johnson to go on tour with her as a backup singer and guitarist. Johnson toured with McBride for over a year and during this time she was also hard at work writing songs for her debut album.

=== Room with a View ===
In 2001, Johnson went on the Girls Night Out Tour opening for high-profile stars Sara Evans, Martina McBride, Reba McEntire and Jamie O'Neal. Later that year, Johnson released her debut album Room with a View in Canada. She co-wrote all 13 songs and co-produced the album. An American release of the album followed a few months later, though only containing the first 11 songs due to differences in the contracts. The album was well-received as it sold a little less than 18,000 copies in its first week and debuted at No. 8 on the US country sales chart. It became Arista Nashville's highest debuting album by a new artist since SoundScan was used to track record sales. The album went on to be certified gold in Canada in a few months.

The first two singles from the album, "Georgia" and "Complicated", were both hits in the United States, with the latter reaching No. 5 on the country charts. The year ended with Johnson receiving a record-breaking 10 nominations from the Canadian Country Music Association, with "Georgia" and "Complicated" competing against each other for "Single of the Year", "Song of the Year" and "Video of the Year". Johnson went on to win five awards, including her first "Female Artist of the Year" award.

Johnson went on tour with Alan Jackson and Kenny Chesney in 2002. Her next single, "I Don't Want You to Go", was a top 10 hit in both Canada and the US. Subsequent singles did well on the Canadian charts but not on the American charts. Johnson was nominated for five CCMA awards that year and won three, including her second consecutive "Female Artist of the Year". She also won a Juno Award for "Best Country Artist" and an Academy of Country Music award for "Top New Female Artist" that year.

In 2003, Johnson went on her first co-headlining tour with Keith Urban. While on tour, she was once again writing songs, this time for her second album. Urban provided his voice for a song on that album.

=== Dress Rehearsal ===
In 2004, Johnson released her second album, Dress Rehearsal, in which she co-produced and wrote 11 of the 12 songs. The album debuted at number nine on Billboard's top country albums charts. The first single from the album, "Simple Life", did well on both the Canadian and the American country charts. This was the only song on the album that she did not write. The second single, "Die of a Broken Heart", also did well on the Canadian country charts but not on the American charts. Later that year, she received seven CCMA award nominations and won five awards.

Johnson left Arista Nashville in 2005 because "what they wanted her to do wasn't her."

=== Love and Negotiation ===
Love & Negotiation, Johnson's 3rd album, was released in Canada under the Angeline Entertainment label in 2006. As with her first album, she wrote all 12 songs, but this time she produced the entire album by herself. The album was originally scheduled to be released in the United States in mid-2007 by Equity Music Group but was delayed and Johnson exited Equity in 2008. In September 2007, Johnson was named Female Vocalist of the Year at the 2007 CCMA Awards. Love & Negotiation was eventually released in the United States digitally through Dancing Lily Music on October 13, 2009, with different artwork.

=== Love Rules ===
In 2010, Johnson released the first single from her upcoming studio album. The single, "Let Me Introduce Myself", is included on her fourth studio album, Love Rules, which was released digitally in the United States on July 21, 2010, and in Canada on August 10, 2010, via Dancing Lily Music. The album is produced by Johnson and Frank Rogers and features 13 new songs. 'Love Rules' was nominated for Country Album of the Year at the 2011 Juno Awards

== Personal life ==
Johnson married Matt Fisher in 2003: they divorced in 2019. They have two children, Abigail [2008] and Bennett [2010].

== Discography ==
=== Studio albums ===
Title	Details	Peak chart positions		Certifications (sales threshold)
Title	Details	US Country	US	Certifications (sales threshold)
Room with a View	Release date: August 7, 2001; Label: Arista Nashville; Formats: CD, cassette	8	87	MC: Gold
Dress Rehearsal	Release date: May 4, 2004; Label: Arista Nashville; Formats: CD, music download	9	65	
Love & Negotiation	Release date: June 6, 2006; Label: Angeline/Equity Music Group; Formats: CD, music download	—	—	
Love Rules	Release date: August 10, 2010; Label: Dancing Lily Music; Formats: CD, music download	—	—	
"—" denotes releases that did not chart

=== Singles ===
Year	Single	Peak positions				Album
Year	Single	CAN Country	CAN	US Country	US	Album
2000	"Georgia"	4 (Note: "Georgia" reached number 4 when RPM ceased publication after the November 6, 2000, issue.)	—	25	98	Room with a View
2001	"Complicated" (Note: "Complicated" also peaked at number 15 on the US Adult Contemporary chart and number 39 the US Adult Pop Songs chart.)	*	—	5	59	Room with a View
2001	"I Don't Want You to Go"	*	—	7	54	Room with a View
2002	"One Day Closer to You"	*	—	24	—	Room with a View
2003	"Simple Life"	14 (Note: "Simple Life" debuted at number 14 when the Radio & Records Canada Country chart debuted in April 2004, several months after the single's release.)	—	13	73	Dress Rehearsal
2004	"Die of a Broken Heart"	4	—	52	—	Dress Rehearsal
2004	"Head Over High Heels"	5	—	—	—	Dress Rehearsal
2005	"Dress Rehearsal"	11	—	—	—	Dress Rehearsal
2006	"Crybaby"	7	—	—	—	Love & Negotiation
2006	"Taking Back My Brave"	6	—	—	—	Love & Negotiation
2007	"Into You"	10	99	—	—	Love & Negotiation
2010	"Let Me Introduce Myself"	8	98	—	—	Love Rules
2010	"The Whole Thing"	15	—	—	—	Love Rules
2011	"Stop for Me"	16	—	—	—	Love Rules
2011	"I'd Still Have You"	18	—	—	—	Love Rules
2012	"Reach You"	20	—	—	—	Love Rules
2020	"Light Changes Everything"	—	—	—	—	Non-album single
2023	"Road Blocks"	—	—	—	—	Non-album single
"—" denotes releases that did not chart

==== As featured artist ====
Year	Single	Peak positions			Certifications	Album
Year	Single	CAN Country	CAN	US Country	Certifications	Album
2001	"America the Beautiful" (Note: All-star collaboration featuring Trace Adkins, Billy Dean, Vince Gill, Carolyn Dawn Johnson, Toby Keith, Brenda Lee, Lonestar, Martina McBride, Jamie O'Neal, Kenny Rogers, and Keith Urban.)	—	—	58		Non-album single
2012	"Baby I Know It" (Johnny Reid featuring Carolyn Dawn Johnson)	3	76	—		Fire It Up
2016	"I Didn't Fall in Love with Your Hair" (Brett Kissel featuring Carolyn Dawn Johnson)	16	88	—	MC: Gold	Pick Me Up
"—" denotes releases that did not chart "*" denotes releases where no chart existed

=== Other charted songs ===
Year	Single	Peak positions	Album
Year	Single	CAN Country	Album
2008	"I Wouldn't Want Christmas (Any Other Way)"	47	Country Heat Christmas 3

=== Music videos ===
Year	Video	Director
2000	"Georgia"	Brent Hedgecock
2001	"America the Beautiful"	Marc Ball
2001	"Complicated"	Lisa Mann
2002	"I Don't Want You to Go"	Lisa Mann
2002	"You Are"	
2004	"Simple Life"	Steven Goldmann
2005	"Dress Rehearsal"	Margaret Malandruccolo
2006	"Crybaby"	Margaret Malandruccolo
2007	"Into You"	
2007	"I Wouldn't Want Christmas (Any Other Way)"	
2010	"The Whole Thing"	
2011	"Stop for Me" (from XM Sessions)	Steve J Murphy
2012	"Baby I Know It" (with Johnny Reid)	

== Singles written by Johnson ==
Year	Title	Artist(s)
1999	"I'm Yours"	Linda Davis
1999	"Single White Female"	Chely Wright
1999	"After a Kiss"	Pam Tillis
1999	"Squeezin' the Love Outta You"	Redmon and Vale
2001	"Downtime"	Jo Dee Messina

== Awards and nominations ==
Year	Organization	Category	Result
2001	Academy of Country Music	Top New Female Vocalist	Nominated
2001	Juno Award	Best Country Female Artist	Nominated
2001	Canadian Country Music Association	TELUS Mobility Fans' Choice Award	Nominated
2001	Canadian Country Music Association	Female Artist of the Year	Won
2001	Canadian Country Music Association	SOCAN Song of the Year ("Complicated")	Won
2001	Canadian Country Music Association	SOCAN Song of the Year ("Georgia")	Nominated
2001	Canadian Country Music Association	Single of the Year ("Complicated")	Won
2001	Canadian Country Music Association	Single of the Year ("Georgia")	Nominated
2001	Canadian Country Music Association	Album of the Year (Room with a View)	Won
2001	Canadian Country Music Association	Video of the Year ("Complicated")	Nominated
2001	Canadian Country Music Association	Video of the Year ("Georgia")	Nominated
2001	Canadian Country Music Association	Chevy Trucks Rising Star Award	Won
2002	Academy of Country Music	Top New Female Vocalist	Won
2002	Country Music Association	Horizon Award	Nominated
2002	Juno Award	Best Country Artist/Group	Won
2002	Canadian Country Music Association	Fans' Choice Award	Nominated
2002	Canadian Country Music Association	Female Artist of the Year	Won
2002	Canadian Country Music Association	SOCAN Song of the Year ("I Don't Want You to Go")	Nominated
2002	Canadian Country Music Association	Single of the Year ("I Don't Want You to Go")	Won
2002	Canadian Country Music Association	CMT Video of the Year ("I Don't Want You to Go")	Won
2003	Canadian Country Music Association	Kraft Cheez Whiz Fans' Choice Award	Nominated
2003	Canadian Country Music Association	Female Artist of the Year	Nominated
2003	American Music Awards	Favorite Country New Artist	Won
2004	Canadian Country Music Association	Kraft Cheez Whiz Fans' Choice Award	Nominated
2004	Canadian Country Music Association	Female Artist of the Year	Nominated
2004	Canadian Country Music Association	SOCAN Song of the Year ("Die of a Broken Heart")	Won
2004	Canadian Country Music Association	Single of the Year ("Simple Life")	Won
2004	Canadian Country Music Association	Album of the Year (Dress Rehearsal)	Won
2004	Canadian Country Music Association	CMT Video of the Year ("Simple Life")	Won
2005	Juno Award	Country Recording of the Year (Dress Rehearsal)	Nominated
2005	Canadian Country Music Association	Kraft Cheez Whiz Fans' Choice Award	Nominated
2005	Canadian Country Music Association	Female Artist of the Year	Nominated
2005	Canadian Country Music Association	SOCAN Song of the Year ("Dress Rehearsal")	Nominated
2005	Canadian Country Music Association	Single of the Year ("Die of a Broken Heart")	Nominated
2006	Canadian Country Music Association	Female Artist of the Year	Won
2006	Canadian Country Music Association	SOCAN Song of the Year ("Crybaby")	Nominated
2007	Juno Award	Country Recording of the Year (Love & Negotiation)	Nominated
2007	Canadian Country Music Association	Kraft Cheez Whiz Fans' Choice Award	Nominated
2007	Canadian Country Music Association	Female Artist of the Year	Won
2007	Canadian Country Music Association	SOCAN Songwriter of the Year ("Taking Back My Brave")	Nominated
2007	Canadian Country Music Association	Album of the Year (Love & Negotiation)	Nominated
2008	Canadian Country Music Association	Female Artist of the Year	Nominated
2010	Canadian Country Music Association	Female Artist of the Year	Nominated
2011	Canadian Country Music Association	Female Artist of the Year	Nominated
2011	Canadian Country Music Association	Album of the Year (Love Rules)	Nominated
2011	Juno Award	Country Album of the Year (Love Rules)	Nominated
2012	Canadian Country Music Association	Female Artist of the Year	Won
2013	Canadian Country Music Association	Female Artist of the Year	Nominated
