= Kicking Stones =

Studio album by Johnny Reid
- Released: April 10, 2007
- Studio: Metalworks (Mississauga, Ontario)
- Genre: Country
- Length: 36:11
- Label: Open Road
- Producer: Brent Maher

Johnny Reid chronology
Born to Roll (2005)	Kicking Stones (2007)	Dance with Me (2009)

Kicking Stones is the fourth studio album by the Canadian country music singer-songwriter Johnny Reid. It was released on April 10, 2007, by Open Road Recordings. "Love Sweet Love", "Kicking Stones", "Darlin'", "Thank You" and "Out of the Blue" were released as singles.

Kicking Stones was nominated for a 2008 Juno Award for Country Recording of the Year. It has since been certified Gold by the Canadian Recording Industry Association for sales of 50,000 units.

"Darlin'" was previously recorded by Tom Jones as the title track of his 1981 album, Darlin'.

== Track listing ==
1. "Out of the Blue" (Brent Maher, Brian Maher, Johnny Reid) – 2:58
2. "Love Sweet Love" (Jim Daddario, Thom Hardwell, Reid) – 3:28
3. "Thank You" (Hardwell, Reid) – 3:53
4. "Darlin'" (Oscar Stewart Blandamer) – 3:14
5. "Feelin' Alright Today" (Hardwell, Reid) – 4:34
6. "Which Way Is Home" (Brent Maher, Brian Maher, Reid) – 3:44
7. "What I Did for Love" (Brent Maher, Thom Schuyler) – 4:02
8. "That Kind of Lonely" (Jeremy Campbell, Reid) – 3:24
9. "To the End of the Road" (Hardwell, Brent Maher, Reid) – 2:54
10. "Kicking Stones" (Brent Maher, Reid) – 4:00

== Personnel ==
- Chad Cromwell – drums, tambourine
- Eric Darken – percussion, tambourine
- Jim Drury – bagpipes
- Connie Ellisor – violin
- Carl Gorodetzky – violin
- Jim Grosjean – viola
- Vicki Hampton – background vocals
- Mike Haynes – trumpet
- Jim Hoke – harmonica
- Fats Kaplin – fiddle, violin
- Anthony LaMarchina – cello
- Tim Lauer – accordion, organ, piano, Wurlitzer
- Sam Levine – horn arrangements, penny whistle, saxophone
- Brent Maher – horn arrangements
- Gordon Mote – piano
- Don Potter – acoustic guitar, mandolin, slide guitar, background vocals
- Carole Rabinowitz-Neuen – cello
- Johnny Reid – lead vocals, background vocals
- Mark Selby – acoustic guitar, electric guitar
- Pam Sixfin – violin
- Liz Stewart – upright bass
- Ilya Toshinsky – acoustic guitar, mandolin
- Bergen White – string arrangements
- Glenn Worf – bass guitar

== Chart performance ==
Chart (2009)	Peak position
Canadian Albums Chart	21
