= You Still Own Me =

Single by Johnny Reid

from the album Born to Roll
- Released: 2004
- Genre: Country
- Length: 3:53
- Label: Open Road
- Songwriters: Philip Douglas, Noah Gordon, Johnny Reid
- Producer: Jeremy Stover

Johnny Reid singles chronology
"She Don't Wanna Hear" (2000)	"You Still Own Me" (2004)	"Sixty to Zero" (2004)

"You Still Own Me" is a song originally recorded by Scottish-Canadian country music artist Johnny Reid. It was recorded on his 2005 album Born to Roll.

== Emerson Drive version ==
"You Still Own Me"

Single by Emerson Drive

from the album Countrified
- B-side: "Everyday Woman"
- Released: July 16, 2007
- Recorded: 2006
- Genre: Country
- Length: 3:11 (radio edit); 3:54 (album version)
- Label: Midas
- Songwriters: Philip Douglas, Noah Gordon, Johnny Reid
- Producers: Keith Follesé, Brad Allen

Emerson Drive singles chronology
"Moments" (2006)	"You Still Own Me" (2007)	"Testify" (2007)

Canadian country music band Emerson Drive recorded a cover of the song on their 2007 album Countrified. The band's cover version has been released as their third U.S. single from the album, and reached a peak of number 22 on the Billboard Hot Country Songs chart dated January 26, 2008, the song's twenty-sixth week on the charts.

=== Chart performance ===
"You Still Own Me" debuted at number 55 on the Hot Country Songs chart dated August 4, 2007. It entered the Top 40 in its eighth chart week, and peaked at number 22 on the country chart dated January 26, 2008.

Chart (2007–2008)	Peak position
US Hot Country Songs (Billboard)	22

== Other versions ==
- Ty Herndon recorded a version of the song for his 2007 album Right About Now.
- John Berry included his version of the song on his 2008 album Those Were the Days.
