= A Place Called Love (Johnny Reid album) =

Studio album by Johnny Reid
- Released: August 31, 2010
- Genres: Country, soul
- Length: 45:23
- Label: EMI
- Producer: Brent Maher

Johnny Reid chronology
Christmas (2009)	A Place Called Love (2010)	Fire It Up (2012)

Singles from A Place Called Love
- 1. "Today I'm Gonna Try and Change the World" Released: June 7, 2010; 2. "Let's Go Higher" Released: September 20, 2010; 3. "Hands of a Working Man" Released: January 31, 2011; 4. "You Gave My Heart a Home" Released: May 30, 2011

Professional ratings
Review scores
Source	Rating
allmusic	3/5 stars
Ottawa Citizen	Positive
Winnipeg Free Press	Positive
Winnipeg Sun	3.5/5 stars
Western Gazette	4/5 stars

A Place Called Love is the sixth studio album by Canadian country music artist Johnny Reid. It was released on August 31, 2010 by EMI Records.

== Singles ==
The first single, "Today I'm Gonna Try and Change the World," peaked at number 41 on the Canadian Hot 100, Reid's highest single peak to date. The album's second single, "Let's Go Higher," peaked at number 58.

== Commercial performance ==
The album peaked at number 1 on the Canadian Albums Chart and stayed at number 1 for four weeks, the second longest streak for 2010, with Eminem's album Recovery being the longest staying at seven weeks at number 1. The album sold 31,000 copies in its first week, and has since sold 96,700 copies. The album was certified double platinum by the CRIA in November 2010 with an excess of 160,000 copies.

== Track listing ==
No.	Title	Writer(s)	Length
1.	"You Gave My Heart a Home"	Brent Maher, Johnny Reid	3:14
2.	"Today I'm Gonna Try and Change the World"	Brent Maher, Reid	3:59
3.	"That Man Is Me"	Brent Maher, Reid	3:47
4.	"Hands of a Working Man"	Brent Maher, Reid	4:01
5.	"Good People"	John Barlow Jarvis, Brent Maher, Reid	3:10
6.	"Doesn't Get Better Than You"	Reid, Mark Selby, Tia Sillers	3:49
7.	"Love Thing"	Brent Maher, Reid	3:14
8.	"Out of the Blue"	Brent Maher, Brian Dean Maher, Reid	2:53
9.	"Tell Me Margaret"	Reid, Mark Sanders	4:32
10.	"This Is Not Goodbye"	Reid, Allen Shamblin	4:21
11.	"Let's Go Higher"	Brent Maher, Reid	3:02
12.	"A Place Called Love"	Brent Maher, Reid	5:21

== Personnel ==
- Roy Agee – trombone
- Eddie Bayers – drums
- Richard Bennett – bouzouki, electric guitar
- Kevin Dailey – assistant, engineer
- Derrik Lee – background vocals
- Everett Drake – background vocals
- Jim Drury – bagpipes
- Dan Dugmore – pedal steel guitar
- Gareth Dunlop – vocal group
- Steve Fischel;– trumpet
- Vicki Hampton – vocal group, background vocals
- Kyle Harris – background vocals
- Steve Herman – trumpet
- John Hinchey – trombone
- Jim Hoke – horn arrangements, baritone saxophone
- John Barlow Jarvis – fender rhodes, organ, piano, vocal group
- Sam Levine – horn arrangements, alto saxophone, baritone sax, tenor saxophone
- Ken Love – mastering
- Brent Maher – engineer, horn arrangements, mixing, producer, vocal group
- Brian Maher – vocal group
- Margaret Malandruccolo – photography
- Brent Mason – acoustic guitar, electric guitar
- Antoine Moonen – graphic design
- Gordon Mote – organ
- The Nashville String Machine – Strings
- Sierra Noble – vocal group
- Steve Patrick – trumpet
- Chris Patterson – Steel drums
- Shandra Penix – background vocals
- Johnny Reid – lead vocals
- Michael Rhodes – bass guitar
- Tammy Rogers – fiddle
- Mark Selby – acoustic guitar, classical guitar, electric guitar
- Steve Sheehan – acoustic guitar
- Troy Taylor – background vocals
- Ilya Toshinsky – acoustic guitar, electric guitar, ukulele
- Bergen White – string arrangements
- Glenn Worf – bass guitar
- Charles Yingling – engineer, mixing
- Nir Z. – drums, percussion, drum programming

== Chart performance ==
=== Album ===
Chart (2010)	Peak position
Canadian Albums Chart	1

=== Singles ===
Year	Single	Peak positions
Year	Single	CAN
2010	"Today I'm Gonna Try and Change the World"	41
2010	"Let's Go Higher"	58
2011	"Hands of a Working Man"	—
2011	"You Gave My Heart a Home"	—
"—" denotes releases that did not chart

=== Year-end charts ===
Chart (2010)	Position
Canadian Albums Chart	13

Chart (2011)	Position
Canadian Albums Chart	47

== Certifications ==
Region	Certification
Canada (Music Canada)	2× Platinum
