= Fire It Up (Johnny Reid song) =

Single by Johnny Reid

from the album Fire It Up
- Released: January 9, 2012
- Genre: Country
- Length: 3:46
- Label: EMI
- Songwriters: Marty Dodson; Alan Frew; Johnny Reid
- Producer: Johnny Reid

Johnny Reid singles chronology
"You Gave My Heart a Home" (2011)	"Fire It Up" (2012)	"Baby I Know It" (2012)

"Fire It Up" is a song co-written and recorded by Canadian country music artist Johnny Reid. It was released in January 2012 as the first single from his 2012 album Fire It Up. The song reached No. 53 on the Canadian Hot 100 in March 2012.

== Music video ==
The music video was directed by Margaret Malandruccolo and premiered in February 2012.

The music video begins with a mother staring out a window "trying to figure out just what to do", and through flashback, we learn she has lost her infant son. As she grieves, she retreats into herself, seeming to close off any form of love, living with the pain of losing someone she loved and unwilling to risk it again. It seems that she "forgot" about the joy she felt when she had her son, until she gets pregnant again and falls in love with her newborn daughter. She "lets love live again" and survives her pain.

The second story is about a racist white man, who boards a train which later crashes, leaving him badly injured. As she lays half-alive in the dirt, a black man reaches out and saves his life, pulling him to safety and "blinding" the white man by his undiscriminating kindness. We see the white man hug the man who saved him, uncaring that he is black.

Throughout the video, many short clips representing life, death, war, peace, hope, rebirth, renewal, survival and love are shown.

== Chart performance ==
Chart (2012)	Peak position
Canada Hot 100 (Billboard)	53

== Certifications ==
Region	Certification	Certified units/sales
Canada (Music Canada)	Gold	40,000^{‡}
^{‡} Sales+streaming figures based on certification alone.
