= Darlin' (Poacher song) =

1970 song by English sax player Oscar Stewart Blandamer

"Darling"

Single by Poacher
- B-side: "So Afraid"
- Released: 1978
- Length: 3:18
- Label: Carrere; Republic; RK
- Songwriter: Oscar Stewart Blandamer
- Producer: Barry Kingston

"Darlin'" is a song written in 1970 by English sax player Oscar Stewart Blandamer. It was first released under the title "Darling" by the British country band Poacher in 1978. It was later a chart hit for Frankie Miller and David Rogers. The track was subsequently recorded by numerous artists including Tom Jones, Barbara Mandrell, Smokie and Johnny Reid.

== Background ==
British country band Poacher formed in Warrington, England, in 1977. They competed in the sixth series of New Faces, a British television talent show. "Darling" was released as their debut single in 1978, produced by Barry Kingston and released through his label RK Records in the United Kingdom. Songwriter Oscar Stewart Blandamer wrote the track in 1970. Producer David Mackay picked up the song for Scottish singer-songwriter Frankie Miller, who recorded it for his album Falling in Love (1979).

== Frankie Miller version ==
"Darlin'"

Single by Frankie Miller

from the album Falling In Love
- B-side: "Drunken Nights in the City"
- Released: 1978
- Recorded: 1978
- Genre: Rock / Blues
- Label: Chrysalis
- Songwriter: Oscar Stuart Blandamer

Frankie Miller singles chronology
"Be Good to Yourself" (1977)	"Darlin'" (1978)	"When I'm Away from You" (1979)

Official video
- "Darlin'" on YouTube

Miller recorded the song in 1978 and had an international hit with it. It reached number 1 on the Norwegian Singles Chart, and 6 in the UK Singles Chart. It also reached the Top Ten (#8) in Australia in 1979.

=== Charts ===
==== Weekly charts ====
Chart (1978-1979)	Peak position
Australia (Kent Music Report)	8
Austria (Ö3 Austria Top 40)	3
Belgium (Ultratop 50 Flanders)	28
New Zealand (Recorded Music NZ)	7
Norway (VG-lista)	1
Switzerland (Schweizer Hitparade)	2
UK Singles (Official Charts)	6
West Germany (GfK)	5

==== Year-end charts ====
Year-end chart performance for "Darlin'"
Chart (1979)	Position
Australia (Kent Music Report)	52

== David Rogers version ==
"Darlin'"

Single by David Rogers
- B-side: "How Long Has It Been"
- Released: 1979
- Genre: Country
- Label: Republic
- Songwriter: Oscar Stewart Blandemer
- Producer: Dave Burgess

David Rogers singles chronology
"When a Woman Cries" (1978)	"Darlin'" (1979)	"You Are My Rainbow" (1979)

A country music version was recorded by the American singer David Rogers. Released on the Republic label, it was never included on an album.

Rogers' recording was a relatively minor hit reaching #18 on the Billboard country singles charts.

=== Charts ===
Chart (1979)	Peak position
US Billboard Hot Country Songs	18

== Other cover versions ==
=== Tom Jones ===
Chart (1981)	Peak position
US Billboard Hot Country Songs	19
US Billboard Bubbling Under Hot 100	3

=== Johnny Reid ===
Chart (2007)	Peak position
Canada Hot 100 (Billboard)	57
Canada Country (Billboard)	3

=== Other artists ===
Barbara Mandrell released a cover version in 1979, which served as the B-side to her number one single "Years."

In 1979, Dutch singer Willem Duyn (formerly of Mouth & MacNeal) issued a Dutch version of the song, titled "Willem", about a fictional person with his name.

In 1980 the song was one of two by Bonnie Raitt included on the soundtrack of the film, Urban Cowboy. It was not released as a single, although her other contribution, Don't It Make Ya Wanna Dance was issued to Country radio. It failed to crack the Top 40 on the chart, peaking at #42.

Ronnie Spector recorded the song on her 1980 album Siren, produced by Genya Ravan.

In 1981 Welsh pop singer Tom Jones released the song as a single from his Mercury Records album Darlin'. Jones' rendition also reached the country music Top 20, peaking at #19 there in addition to reaching number 3 on the Bubbling Under Hot 100.

The British band Smokie recorded a cover version in their 2000 covers album Uncovered.

In 2004 singer Bonnie Tyler released a version of the song on her album Simply Believe.

In 2007 Canadian singer Johnny Reid also released a version of the song on the album Kicking Stones. His version peaked at number 57 on the Canadian Hot 100.
