= Simple Life (Carolyn Dawn Johnson song) =

Single by Carolyn Dawn Johnson

from the album Dress Rehearsal
- Released: November 24, 2003
- Genre: Country
- Length: 3:50
- Label: Arista Nashville
- Songwriters: Troy Verges; Aimee Mayo; Chris Lindsey; Hillary Lindsey
- Producers: Carolyn Dawn Johnson; Dann Huff

Carolyn Dawn Johnson singles chronology
"Just Another Girl" (2003)	"Simple Life" (2003)	"Die of a Broken Heart" (2004)

"Simple Life" is a song by Canadian country music singer-songwriter Carolyn Dawn Johnson, recorded for her second studio album Dress Rehearsal (2004). Despite being a successful songwriter, this is the only song on the album where Johnson does not have a writer's credit and is the first song recorded by Johnson to not be written by her, with the track instead being written by songwriters Troy Verges, Aimee Mayo, Chris Lindsey, and Hillary Lindsey, with production being handled by Johnson and Dann Huff. The song was released on November 24, 2003, to country radio via Arista Nashville as the lead single from Dress Rehearsal. It received the Single of the Year and CMT Video of the Year awards at the 2004 Canadian CMA Awards.

== Critical reception ==
Deborah Evans Price, of Billboard magazine reviewed the song favorably, saying that the production has an "earthy, organic feel, infused with dobro, mandolin and some tasty guitar work." She calls Johnson's voice "effervescent" and "full of passion and verve."

== Music video ==
Steven Goldmann directed the video for "Simple Life". The video shows Johnson in Hollywood, Los Angeles, which intercuts to scenes of the singer in a house in a rural area. Johnson's husband, Matt Fisher, is featured in the music video as a policeman. The video debuted to Great American Country (GAC) on March 14, 2004. The video was then released to Country Music Television (CMT) on March 21, 2004.

== Charts ==
"Simple Life" debuted at number 55 on the US Billboard Hot Country Songs chart the week of November 29, 2003.

=== Weekly charts ===
Chart (2003–2004)	Peak position
Canada Country (Radio & Records)	14 (Note: "Simple Life" debuted at number 14 when the Radio & Records Canada Country chart debuted in April 2004, several months following the song's release.)
US Hot Country Songs (Billboard)	13
US Billboard Hot 100	73
US Country Top 50 (Radio & Records)	13

=== Year-end charts ===
Chart (2004)	Position
US Country Songs (Billboard)	49
US Country (Radio & Records)	62
