= A Christmas Gift to You =

Studio album by Johnny Reid
- Released: October 22, 2013
- Genres: Country, Christmas
- Length: 39:46
- Label: Universal Music Canada
- Producer: Bob Ezrin

Johnny Reid chronology
Fire It Up (2012)	A Christmas Gift to You (2013)	What Love Is All About (2015)

A Christmas Gift to You is the second Christmas album by Canadian country music artist Johnny Reid. It was released on October 22, 2013 by Universal Music Canada. The album was produced by Bob Ezrin. It features collaborations with Peter Frampton and Isabelle Boulay.

It won the 2014 Juno Award for Adult Contemporary Album of the Year.

== Commercial performance ==
In its first week of release, the album debuted at number seven on the Canadian Albums Chart. In the week of December 18, 2013, the album sold 18,000 copies, peaking at number two behind Beyoncé Knowles's self-titled album.

As of January 10, 2014, the album has sold 106,000 copies in Canada.

== Track listing ==
No.	Title	Length
1.	"I Heard the Bells on Christmas Day"	4:06
2.	"Angels We Have Heard on High"	2:59
3.	"O Holy Night"	3:59
4.	"Do You Hear What I Hear?" (featuring Peter Frampton)	3:41
5.	"Mary, Did You Know?"	4:10
6.	"Winter Star"	3:32
7.	"Hark! The Herald Angels Sing/O Come All Ye Faithful"	2:50
8.	"Away in a Manger"	3:05
9.	"Lo, How a Rose E'er Blooming"	1:39
10.	"The Little Drummer Boy"	3:58
11.	"Silent Night/Sainte Nuit" (featuring Isabelle Boulay)	3:13
12.	"Have Yourself a Merry Little Christmas"	2:34
Total length:		39:46

A Christmas Gift to You - Platinum Edition (2014)
No.	Title	Length
13.	"Oh Christmas Tree"	3:07
14.	"Go Tell It On The Mountain" (featuring Natalie MacMaster & The Rankins)	3:47
15.	"God Rest Ye Merry Gentlemen" (featuring The Tenors)	2:08
16.	"Merry Christmas Caledonia" (featuring Bruce Guthro & Natalie MacMaster)	4:21

== Charts and certifications ==
=== Weekly charts ===
Chart (2013)	Peak position
Canadian Albums (Billboard)	1

=== Year-end charts ===
Chart (2014)	Position
Canadian Albums (Billboard)	12

=== Certifications ===
Region	Certification	Certified units/sales
Canada (Music Canada)	2× Platinum	160,000^{^}
^{^} Shipments figures based on certification alone.
