= Love Rules (album) =

Studio album by Carolyn Dawn Johnson
- Released: July 21, 2010 (US); August 10, 2010 (Canada)
- Genre: Country
- Length: 51:05
- Label: Dancing Lily Music (US); Universal Music Canada
- Producer: Carolyn Dawn Johnson; Frank Rogers

Carolyn Dawn Johnson chronology
Love & Negotiation (2006)	Love Rules (2010)

Singles from Love Rules
- 1. "Let Me Introduce Myself" Released: April 19, 2010; 2. "The Whole Thing" Released: August 23, 2010; 3. "Stop for Me" Released: February 21, 2011; 4. "I'd Still Have You" Released: July 18, 2011; 5. "Reach You" Released: March 19, 2012

Love Rules is the fourth studio album by Canadian country music singer-songwriter Carolyn Dawn Johnson. The album was released through iTunes in the United States on July 21, 2010. The album was also released on August 10, 2010 in Canada through Dancing Lily Music and Universal Music Canada.

== Track listing ==
All tracks written by Carolyn Dawn Johnson, co-writers are noted.

Love Rules track listing
No.	Title	Writer(s)	Length
1.	"Let Me Introduce Myself"	Megan James	3:54
2.	"The Whole Thing"	Walt Aldridge	3:42
3.	"I’d Still Have You"	Aldridge	4:04
4.	"Stop for Me"	Natalie Hemby	4:06
5.	"Reach You"	Brad Crisler	5:09
6.	"Hangin' On"	Connie Harrington; Tim Nichols	3:57
7.	"What If"	Frank Rogers	4:14
8.	"Bitterness"	Kate York	4:09
9.	"I Just Want My Life Back"	Steven Dale Jones	4:46
10.	"At the Time"	Deanna Bryant; Jaida Dreyer	3:47
11.	"Teach Me"	Chuck Jones	4:59
12.	"Love Rules"	Gene Nelson	4:07
13.	"All Done"		0:05
Total length:			51:05

== Chart performance ==
=== Singles ===
Year	Single	Peak positions
Year	Single	CAN
2010	"Let Me Introduce Myself"	98
2010	"The Whole Thing"	—
2011	"Stop for Me"	—
2011	"I'd Still Have You"	—
2012	"Reach You"	—
"—" denotes releases that did not chart
