= Dance with Me (Johnny Reid album) =

Studio album by Johnny Reid
- Released: March 10, 2009
- Studios: The Blue Room Studios, Nashville, TN
- Genre: Country
- Length: 36:34
- Label: Open Road
- Producer: Brent Maher

Johnny Reid chronology
| Kicking Stones (2007) | Dance with Me (2009) | Christmas (2009) |

Singles from Dance with Me
- 1. "A Woman Like You" Released: January 5, 2009; 2. "Dance with Me" Released: June 15, 2009; 3. "Old Flame" Released: October 19, 2009

Professional ratings
Review scores
| Source | Rating |
|---|---|
| Allmusic | 3.5/5 stars |

Dance with Me is the fifth studio album by Canadian country music artist Johnny Reid. It was released on March 10, 2009, by Open Road Recordings. The album was certified Gold within 48 hours of release.

== Track listing ==
| No. | Title | Writer(s) | Length |
|---|---|---|---|
| 1. | "A Woman Like You" | Johnny Reid, Brent Maher | 3:41 |
| 2. | "Old Flame" | Reid, Maher | 3:45 |
| 3. | "Dance with Me" | Reid, Tia Sillers, Victoria Banks | 4:16 |
| 4. | "Let's Take It Outside" | Reid, Mark Selby, Sillers | 3:14 |
| 5. | "Hey O!" | Reid, Maher | 2:59 |
| 6. | "Brings Me Home" | Reid, Thom Hardwell | 3:52 |
| 7. | "Keep Working on Me" | Reid, Maher, Hardwell | 3:00 |
| 8. | "A Moon to Remember" | Reid, Maher, Hardwell | 4:12 |
| 9. | "Slow Down" | Reid, Cyndi Thomson | 3:19 |
| 10. | "My Old Friend" | Reid | 4:16 |

== Personnel ==
- Richard Bennett – acoustic guitar, electric guitar
- Dan Dugmore – pedal steel, dobro
- Vicki Hampton – background vocals
- Jim Hoke – autoharp, pennywhistle, harmonica, accordion
- John Jarvis – piano
- Fats Kaplin – pedal steel, fiddle
- Tim Lauer – organ
- Brent Maher – acoustic guitar, percussion, background vocals
- Gordon Mote – piano, organ
- Louis Dean Nunley – background vocals
- Johnny Reid – lead vocals
- Tammy Rogers – violin, fiddle
- Mark Selby – acoustic guitar, electric guitar
- Glenn Worf – bass guitar
- Nir Z – drums, percussion
- The Nashville String Machine – strings
- Kevin Dailey - engineer

== Chart performance ==
=== Weekly charts ===
| Chart (2009) | Peak position |
|---|---|
| Canadian Albums (Billboard) | 3 |

=== Year-end charts ===
| Chart (2009) | Position |
|---|---|
| Canadian Albums (Billboard) | 26 |

=== Singles ===
| Year | Single | Peak positions |
| Year | Single | CAN |
|---|---|---|
| 2009 | "A Woman Like You" | 51 |
| 2009 | "Dance with Me" | 66 |
| 2009 | "Old Flame" | 85 |

== Certifications ==
| Region | Certification |
|---|---|
| Canada (Music Canada) | 2× Platinum |
