= Fire It Up (Johnny Reid album) =

Studio album by Johnny Reid
- Released: March 12, 2012
- Genre: Country
- Length: 43:45
- Label: EMI
- Producer: Johnny Reid

Johnny Reid chronology
A Place Called Love (2010)	Fire It Up (2012)	A Christmas Gift to You (2013)

Singles from Fire It Up
- 1. "Fire It Up" Released: January 9, 2012; 2. "Baby I Know It" Released: May 14, 2012; 3. "Dedicated to You" Released: September 2012

Professional ratings
Review scores
Source	Rating
The Edmonton Journal	3/5 stars

Fire It Up is the seventh studio album by Canadian country music artist Johnny Reid. It was released on March 12, 2012 by EMI Records. The album features duets with Serena Ryder and Carolyn Dawn Johnson.

Fire It Up won Country Album of the Year at the 2013 Juno Awards.

== Track listing ==
No.	Title	Writer(s)	Length
1.	"Fire It Up"	Marty Dodson, Alan Frew, Johnny Reid	3:44
2.	"Walking on Water" (featuring Serena Ryder)	J. Reid, Mark Selby	3:27
3.	"Right Where I Belong"	Thom Hardwell, J. Reid, Nick Trevisick	3:40
4.	"Yeah It's All Right"	Hardwell, J. Reid, Trevisick	2:49
5.	"Let's Have a Party"	Hardwell, J. Reid	3:00
6.	"Dedicated to You"	Hardwell, J. Reid, Mike Reid	4:01
7.	"Dancin' Shoes"	Hardwell, J. Reid, Trevisick	3:25
8.	"Baby I Know It" (featuring Carolyn Dawn Johnson)	Caeland Garner, J. Reid	4:10
9.	"Love of a Lifetime"	J. Reid, Trevisick	4:06
10.	"What Makes the World Go Around"	Hardwell, J. Reid, Trevisick	3:54
11.	"You Got Me"	J. Reid	3:25
12.	"Till We Meet Again"	Hardwell, J. Reid, Trevisick	4:04

== Personnel ==
- Kevin Killen - Mixer
- ALIAS Chamber Ensemble - strings
- Chopper Anderson - electric bass
- Tom Bukovac - acoustic guitar, electric guitar
- Chad Cromwell - drums, percussion
- Chuck Fields - drums
- Jon-Paul Frappiér - trumpet
- Vicki Hampton - background vocals
- Thom Hardwell - acoustic guitar
- Jon Jackson - tenor saxophone
- Carolyn Dawn Johnson - duet vocals on "Baby I Know It"
- Johnny Reid - lead vocals
- Michael Rhodes - bass guitar
- Mike Rojas - accordion, Hammond B-3 organ, keyboards, grand piano, Wurlitzer
- Serena Ryder - duet vocals on "Walking on Water"
- Mark Selby - bouzouki, acoustic guitar, harmonica
- Crystal Taliafero - background vocals
- Toronto Police Pipe Band - bagpipes
- Oscar Utterström - trombone
- Chris West - baritone saxophone, tenor saxophone
- Jonathan Yudkin - cello, fiddle, mandolin

== Chart performance ==
=== Album ===
Chart (2012)	Peak position
Canadian Albums Chart	2

=== Singles ===
Year	Single	Peak positions
Year	Single	CAN
2012	"Fire It Up"	53
2012	"Baby I Know It"	76
2012	"Dedicated to You"	99

=== Year-end charts ===
Chart (2012)	Position
Canadian Albums Chart	22

== Certifications ==
Region	Certification
Canada (Music Canada)	Platinum
