= Complicated (Carolyn Dawn Johnson song) =

Single by Carolyn Dawn Johnson

from the album Room with a View
- B-side: "Georgia"
- Released: April 9, 2001
- Genre: Country
- Length: 3:48
- Label: Arista Nashville
- Songwriters: Shaye Smith; Carolyn Dawn Johnson
- Producers: Paul Worley; Carolyn Dawn Johnson

Carolyn Dawn Johnson singles chronology
"Georgia" (2000)	"Complicated" (2001)	"I Don't Want You to Go" (2001)

"Complicated" is a song co-written and recorded by Canadian country music singer Carolyn Dawn Johnson. It was released in April 2001 the second single from her debut album Room with a View. The song was also her second entry on two U.S. singles charts, peaking at number 5 on Billboard Hot Country Singles & Tracks (now Hot Country Songs) and number 59 on the Billboard Hot 100. It also reached number 15 on that magazine's Hot Adult Contemporary Tracks chart. The song was written by Johnson and Shaye Smith.

== Content ==
"Complicated" is a mid-tempo country pop ballad where the female narrator expresses her fear of admitting her strong feelings to the object of her affection - a good friend, calling her feelings "complicated."

== Music video ==
The music video was directed by Lisa Mann and premiered in mid-2001. It shows Johnson performing the song in several different areas of a large, round room with many ledges, trying to find her lover, but being unsuccessful every time. She tries to write a song, but throws the piece of paper, which in turn causes many other pieces of paper to fall on top of her. Many scenes show many different images of Johnson trying to catch up to each other, and one scene shows one image handing a phone to another. Eventually she does locate her boyfriend, and the video ends with them having fun together on the stairs and in an elevator. Scenes of Johnson performing the song against a white background with many flickering white lights, and laying down on a sofa are also shown.

== Charts ==
"Complicated" debuted at number 55 on the U.S. Billboard Hot Country Singles & Tracks for the week of April 21, 2001.

Chart (2001–2002)	Peak position
US Hot Country Songs (Billboard)	5
US Billboard Hot 100	59
US Adult Contemporary (Billboard)	15
US Adult Pop Airplay (Billboard)	39

=== Year-end charts ===
Year-end chart performance for "Complicated" by Carolyn Dawn Johnson
Chart (2001)	Position
Canada Radio (Nielsen BDS)	31
US Country Songs (Billboard)	22

== Release history ==
Release dates and format(s) for "Complicated"
Region	Date	Format(s)	Label(s)	Ref.
United States	April 9, 2001	Country radio	Arista Nashville	
United States	March 2002	Adult contemporary radio	Arista Nashville	
United States	May 2002	Hot adult contemporary radio	Arista Nashville	
