= Poacher (band) =

Poacher was a 1970s English country music band from Warrington, England, featuring, amongst others, Peter Frampton on vocals, Tim Flaherty on guitar, and Steve Millington on keyboards. Poacher won the British TV talent show New Faces in 1977. Poacher are best known for having preceded blues-rocker Frankie Miller's version of the song "Darlin'", by sax player Oscar Stewart Blandamer, which was a trans-Atlantic hit for Miller in 1978. The band backed Sarah Jory's first album.
