= Brent Maher =

American songwriter and record producer

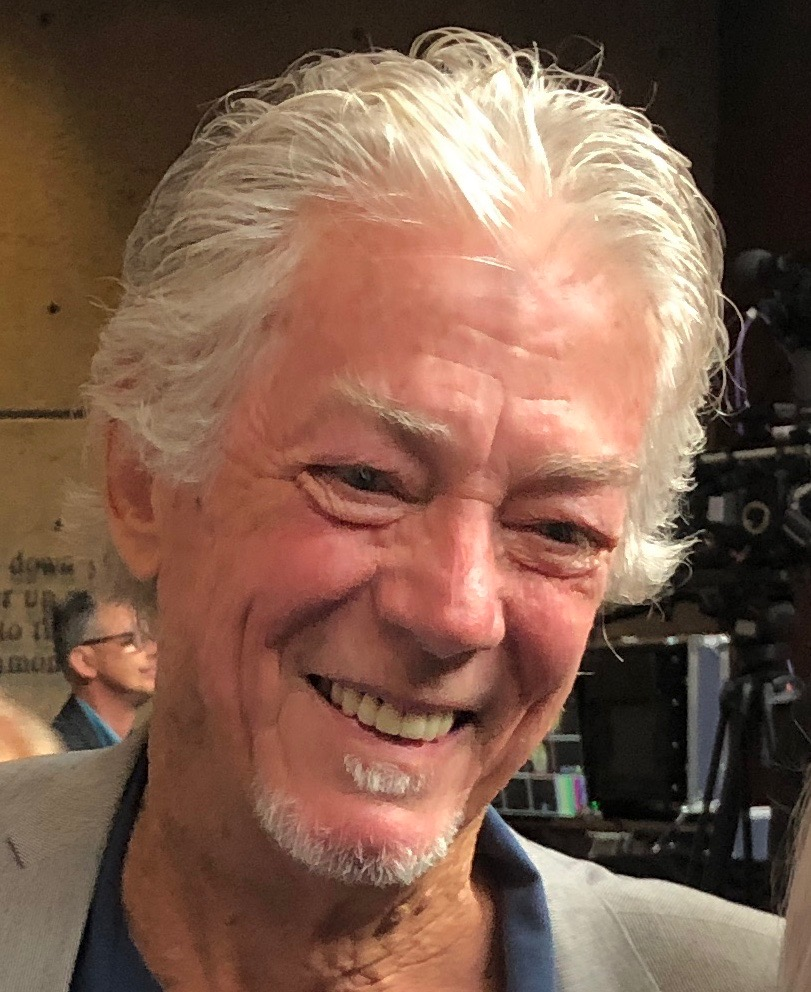
Brent Maher at Country Music Hall of Fame, Nashville, August 8, 2018

Brent Maher is a producer, engineer, and songwriter currently residing in Nashville, Tennessee. He has produced and engineered six Grammy Award-winning records and received awards from the CMA, ACM, CCMA, ASCAP, SOCAN and NSAI. Maher engineered classic recordings like Ike and Tina Turner’s “Proud Mary” and The 5th Dimension's "Age of Aquarius". He discovered The Judds and produced all ten of their albums, writing many of their hit songs. Maher has also served two terms on the board of directors of the Academy of Country Music.

== Early life ==
Born in Chase, Kansas, Maher lived there until he moved to Denver, Colorado as a teenager. He joined the Air Force after high school and was stationed near Nashville where he worked as an aircraft mechanic. During this time, he formed a cover band called "The Journeymen" and played guitar and trumpet. While reading the back of the album by Curtis Mayfield, he read in the credits "recording engineer" and realized that this was his calling. He took correspondence courses in sound and engineering.

== Musical career ==
After leaving the Air Force at age 22, Maher was hired as a backup engineer in Nashville by Monument Records president, Fred Foster and chief engineer and eventual mentor, Bill Porter. Maher said, "As fate would have it, I walked through that door with my Sunday best suit on at the right time and they gave me an opportunity that changed my life". After a few years, Bill Porter purchased United Recording Studios in Las Vegas and asked Maher to go with him. Maher engineered classic recordings like Ike and Tina Turner’s “Proud Mary” and The 5th Dimension's "Age of Aquarius"; also recordings by Duke Ellington, Chuck Berry, Sammy Davis Jr., Gladys Knight, Sly and the Family Stone, and others. Maher's work as a producer picked up when he recorded Benny Hester's debut LP in Vegas.

In the late 1970s, Maher moved back to Nashville to help owner Buzz Cason build the Creative Workshop recording studio. In Nashville, Maher engineered Elvis' last number one song “Way Down" in addition to engineering records with Olivia Newton-John, Ray Charles, Merle Haggard and Melanie. Other producer credits include albums with Dottie West, Kenny Rogers and Dave Loggins. In the early '80's, Maher discovered mother/daughter duo, The Judds and developed their acoustic country sound. After getting The Judd's a record deal with RCA/Curb, he co-wrote many of their hits and produced all their platinum LP's.

=== Songwriter ===
Maher received Song of the Year by the Academy of Country Music for writing and producing the Judds’ 1984 chart-topping single, “Why Not Me.” It was followed by awards for “Girls Night Out” (1985), “Rockin' with the Rhythm of the Rain” (1986), “I Know Where I’m Going” (1987), "Let Me Tell You About Love" (1989), “Born To Be Blue” (1990), and other Judd hits. Maher also co-wrote many of Johnny Reid's hit singles in Canada including "Out of the Blue” (2007), "A Woman Like You” (2009 – CCMA for Single of Year), "Let's Go Higher" (2010), and "Today I'm Gonna Try and Change the World" (2010).

Additional hits include "Some Kind of Trouble" (Tanya Tucker), "A Lesson in Leavin'" (Dottie West, later covered by Jo Dee Messina), "When Love Starts Talkin'" (Wynonna), and other recordings by Tina Turner, Kenny Rogers, Dottie West, Carl Perkins, Jo Dee Messina, Wynonna, and Shelby Lynne.

=== Producer ===
Maher produced all ten of The Judds’ records, Kathy Mattea’s “Good News,” Shelby Lynne's big band project “Temptation,” and albums by artists including Kenny Rogers, Dottie West, Benny Hester, and Jo Dee Messina. On the international scene, Maher produced Canadian Country artist Johnny Reid's breakthrough Country record "Kicking Stones" and following LP's "Dance With Me" and "A Place Called Love," making Reid one of the top-selling artists in Canada. The albums won CCMA awards for Album of the Year (2009), Best Selling Canadian Album (2009, 2010, 2011), and a Juno Award for Country Album of the Year (2010, 2011). Maher also developed and produced the Grammy nominated self-titled debut from Bering Strait, a young band composed of seven Russian musicians whose story was covered by 60 Minutes.

=== Engineer ===
Maher's engineering credits include all the projects he has produced, and also extend to Ike and Tina Turner's “Proud Mary,” Roy Orbison, Diana Ross & the Supremes, Faces, Duke Ellington, Chuck Berry, Sammy Davis Jr., Gladys Knight, Merle Haggard and the Strangers, Glen Campbell/ Tanya Tucker, Sly and the Family Stone, and others.

=== Studio owner ===
In 1986, Maher bought Creative Workshop II from Cason and renamed it Creative Recording. Artists recording at the studio included The Judds, Wynonna, Kathy Mattea, Kenny Rogers, and Shelby Lynne. In 2002, John & Martina McBride acquired Creative Recording, rebuilding and relaunching it as Blackbird Studio.

== Awards and nominations ==
=== Grammy Awards ===
2007 – Lost Highway – Willie Nelson and Ray Price (Engineer)

1993 – Good News – Kathy Mattea (Producer)

1991 –Love Can Build A Bridge – The Judds (Producer)

1988 – Give A Little Love – The Judds (Producer)

1986 – Grandpa – The Judds (Producer)

1984 – Mama, He's Crazy – The Judds (Producer)

=== ASCAP Awards ===
1978 – Bluer Than Blue – Michael Johnson (Producer)

1979 – You Pick Me Up (And Put Me Down) – Dottie West (Writer)

1980 – Leavin's for Unbelievers – Dottie West (Writer)

1980 – A Lesson in Leavin' – Dottie West (Writer)

1985 – Why Not Me – The Judds (Writer)

1985 – Girls' Night Out – The Judds (Writer)

1986 – Rockin' with the Rhythm of the Rain – The Judds (Writer)

1988 – I Know Where I'm Going – The Judds (Writer)

1989 – Turn It Loose – The Judds (Writer)

1989 – Crying Shame – The Judds (Writer)

1990 – Let Me Tell You About Love – The Judds (Writer)

1991 – Born to be Blue – The Judds (Writer)

1992 – Some Kind of Trouble – Tanya Tucker (Writer)

=== NSAI Awards ===
1987 – Rockin' with the Rhythm of the Rain – The Judds (Writer)

== Songwriter discography ==
SONG	ARTIST	ALBUM	LABEL	CHART POSITION/CERTIFICATIONS	COUNTRY
Girls' Night Out	The Judds	Why Not Me	RCA/Curb	#1 Country Single, Multi-Platinum	US
I Know Where I'm Going	The Judds	Heartland	RCA/Curb	#1 Country Single, Album rel., Multi-Platinum	US
Let Me Tell You About Love	The Judds	River of Time	RCA/Curb	#1 Country Single, Multi-Platinum	US
Why Not Me	The Judds	Why Not Me	RCA/Curb	#1 Country Single/ACM Song of the Year, Multi-Platinum	US
Rockin' with the Rhythm of the Rain	The Judds	Rockin' with the Rhythm	RCA/Curb	#1 Billboard, Multi-Platinum	US
Born to be Blue	The Judds	Love Can Build A Bridge	RCA/Curb	#1 Country Single, #4 Billboard, Album rel., Multi-Platinum	US
Turn It Loose	The Judds	Heartland	RCA/Curb	#1 Country Single, Multi-Platinum	US
When Love Starts Talkin'	Wynonna Judd	The Other Side	Curb	#13 Country Single, Multi-Platinum	US
Leavin's for Unbelievers	Dottie West	Special Delivery	EMI/United Artists	#13 Country Single	US
Lesson in Leavin'	Dottie West	Special Delivery	EMI/United Artists	#1 Country Single	US
Some Kind of Trouble	Tanya Tucker	What Do I Do with Me	Liberty	#1 Country Single	US
Crying Shame	Michael Johnson	That's That	RCA	#4 Country Single	US
Tell Me True	Juice Newton	Emotion	RCA	#8 Country Single	US
Rosalee	Stacy Dean Campbell	Lonesome Wins Again	Columbia	#54 Country Single	US
Where Do We Go From Here	Shelby Lynne	Temptation	Morgan Creek	Album rel.	US
Work On Me	Tina Turner	Work On Me/Born Free	United Artists	Album rel.	US
What I Did For Love	Kenny Rogers	Love Is Strange	Reprise	Album rel.	US
Written On My Heart	Jenai	Cool Me Down	Atlantic	Album rel.	US
Out of the Blue	Johnny Reid	Kicking Stones	Open Road/UMG	Top 10, Multi-Platinum	CA
A Woman Like You	Johnny Reid	Dance With Me	Open Road/ UMG	#3 Country Single, Multi-Platinum	CA
Today I'm Gonna Try and Change the World	Johnny Reid	A Place Called Love	EMI	#2 Country Single, Platinum	CA
Let's Go Higher	Johnny Reid	A Place Called Love	EMI	#2 Country and AC Single, Multi-Platinum	CA

== Other ventures ==
Beyond his musical career, Brent Maher has given lectures on engineering and production for various schools and universities. Maher has one of the largest collections of vintage Gretsch guitars in the US. Maher was also one of the founding members of Middle Tennessee Fly Fishers Inc. In 2011, he created "Cowboy Golf" and now designs golf courses on farms, which led to founding the Boots and Bandana Golf Association based in Franklin, Tennessee at Pines Golf Course. Maher, John Reger Jr. and Michael Pasternak and associates are currently establishing a network of BBGA courses with ranch owners and recreational facilities across the country to build their own cowboy style golf courses. The events benefit MusiCares, The Facial Pain Research Foundation, and Gentle Carousel Therapy Horses.
