= A Woman Like You (Johnny Reid song) =

Single by Johnny Reid

from the album Dance with Me
- Released: January 27, 2009
- Genre: Country
- Length: 3:41
- Label: Open Road
- Songwriters: Johnny Reid, Brent Maher

Johnny Reid singles chronology
"Out of the Blue" (2008)	"A Woman Like You" (2009)	"Dance with Me" (2009)

"A Woman Like You" is a single by Canadian country music artist Johnny Reid. It was recorded on his 2009 album Dance with Me, reaching a peak of #51 on the Canadian Hot 100.

== Chart performance ==
Chart (2009)	Peak position
Canada Hot 100 (Billboard)	51
Canada Country (Billboard)	4

== Certifications ==
Region	Certification	Certified units/sales
Canada (Music Canada)	Platinum	80,000^{‡}
^{‡} Sales+streaming figures based on certification alone.

== Cover versions ==
- Danis Mallais (auteur-compositeur-interprète Canada) from his album Authentique (2017)

Al Copegog 2013 youtube https://www.youtube.com/watch?v=WVJx5T3cEZ4
