= I Don't Want You to Go =

Single by Carolyn Dawn Johnson

from the album Room with a View
- B-side: "Room with a View"
- Released: December 10, 2001
- Genre: Country
- Length: 4:40 (album version)
- Label: Arista Nashville
- Songwriters: Tommy Polk; Carolyn Dawn Johnson
- Producers: Paul Worley; Carolyn Dawn Johnson

Carolyn Dawn Johnson singles chronology
"Complicated" (2001)	"I Don't Want You to Go" (2001)	"You Are" (2002)

"I Don't Want You to Go" is a song co-written and recorded by Canadian country music singer Carolyn Dawn Johnson. It was released in December 2001 as the third single from her debut album Room with a View. The song was also her third entry on two U.S. singles charts, peaking at number 7 on Billboard Hot Country Singles & Tracks (now Hot Country Songs) and number 54 on the Billboard Hot 100. It was written by Johnson and Tommy Polk.

The song was previously recorded by Mindy McCready on the international version of her 1999 album I'm Not So Tough.

== Content ==
"I Don't Want You to Go" is a moderate up-tempo which finds the female narrator wanting to stay in bed with her lover instead of going to work.

== Music video ==
The music video was directed by Lisa Mann and premiered in early 2002.

== Chart positions ==
"I Don't Want You to Go" debuted at number 60 on the U.S. Billboard Hot Country Singles & Tracks for the week of December 15, 2001.

Chart (2001–2002)	Peak position
US Hot Country Songs (Billboard)	7
US Billboard Hot 100	54

=== Year-end charts ===
Chart (2002)	Position
US Country Songs (Billboard)	39
