= Johnny Reid =

Scottish-Canadian country music artist

- Born: August 21, 1973 (age 52); Lanark, Scotland United Kingdom
- Occupation: Singer
- Years active: 1997–present
- Labels: JCD, DreamWorks, Open Road, EMI Music Canada, Manhattan
- Website: www.johnnyreid.com

John Kirkland Reid (born August 21, 1973) is a Scottish-Canadian country music artist. Reid emigrated to Canada in July 1989 when he was 16 from Scotland, United Kingdom. His father, a diesel mechanic, wanted to give Reid and his brother opportunities he did not think they would have in Scotland. He graduated from Turner Fenton Secondary School in Brampton, Ontario, in 1992. Reid went on to attend Bishop's University in Lennoxville, Quebec, where he met his wife (and was a kicker on the varsity football team).

Reid moved to Nashville, Tennessee to make country music; he and his family reside in Nashville. He was nominated for the 2008 Juno Award for Country Recording of the Year for Kicking Stones. Reid was named Male Artist of the Year at both the 2008 and 2009 CCMA Awards. He also performed at the Canada Day celebrations on Parliament Hill on July 1, 2010, which the Queen and Prince Philip attended.

== Music career ==
=== Another Day, Another Dime and Johnny Reid ===
Reid's debut album, Another Day, Another Dime, was released in 1997 on JCD Records. No singles were ever released from the album. However, it was his second album, which was self-titled and released in 2000, where he saw minimal chart success. Three singles from this album were released and all three of which charted. The lead-off and debut single, "Given Up on Me", was a minor hit on the RPM Country Tracks chart. It reached a peak of No. 45. A second single, "Runnin' Wild" charted at No. 50. The album's third and final single, "She Don't Wanna Hear", just missed the Top 40 of the country chart, peaking at No. 41.

=== Born to Roll ===
Reid's first single in four years, "You Still Own Me", was released in 2004. It was the lead-off single to his third studio album, Born to Roll. The charted in the 20 of the Canadian country charts. Born to Roll was released on March 15, 2005, via Open Road Recordings, and peaked at No. 5 on the Canadian Top Country Albums chart. A second single, "Sixty to Zero", charted to No. 19, however it was the album's third single to get Reid into the Top 10 of the charts. "Missing an Angel" eventually reached No. 6 on the charts, giving him his first Top 10 single of his career. A fourth single, "Time Flies", also managed to chart in the Top 10, peaking at No. 9. A fifth and final single, "Gypsy in My Soul", only made No. 12. Born to Roll became his first certified album, being certified Gold by the Canadian Recording Industry Association (CRIA).

In 2007, Canadian music group Emerson Drive covered "You Still Own Me". They took the song to No. 22 on the U.S. Billboard Hot Country Songs chart.

=== Kicking Stones and Dance with Me ===
In 2007, a new single entitled "Love Sweet Love", would be released and act as the lead-off single to Kicking Stones, which was released on April 10, 2007. The single peaked at No. 11 on the Canadian country charts and was followed by a string of Top 20 singles. The second single, the album's title track, reached No. 13, and "Darlin'", the album's third single, became Reid's first Top 5 single. Two additional singles, "Thank You" and "Out of the Blue", were released, peaking at No. 13 and No. 7 on the charts, respectively.

Reid's fifth studio album, Dance with Me, was released in March 2009, and debuted at No. 1 on the Canadian Top Country Albums chart and No. 3 on the Canadian Albums Chart. "A Woman Like You" was released as the first single from the album and reached No. 4 on the country charts, peaking No. 4 in 2009. The title track was then released and reached No. 10, followed by "Old Flame", which has so far peaked in the Top 10.

A Christmas album, entitled Christmas, was released November 10, 2009. Reid's first live DVD, Live at the Jubilee was released on February 9, 2010.

=== A Place Called Love ===
In 2010, Johnny Reid signed with EMI for the release of his next studio album, A Place Called Love, released August 31, 2010. The first single, "Today I'm Gonna Try and Change the World" was released on June 7. Reid's second live DVD, Heart & Soul was released on March 29, 2011, in Canada.

=== Fire It Up ===
2012 marked the release of Johnny Reid's second album for EMI, Fire It Up. The title track was released on January 10 to Canadian radio and iTunes. The album features Canadian guest artists Carolyn Dawn Johnson and Serena Ryder. The album was also released as a deluxe version with four bonus songs and a DVD featuring the making of the album.

Reid released his second Christmas album, A Christmas Gift to You, on October 22, 2013.

=== What Love Is All About ===
Reid's first studio album for Universal Music Canada, What Love Is All About, was released on November 13, 2015. The album features a duet with Kardinal Offishall. Reid's first single off the album was "A Picture of You". It was followed by "Honey Honey".

=== Revival ===
Reid released Revival with Universal Music Canada on November 3, 2017. The album featured 13 original songs and marked Reid's most soul-inspired album to date. In 2018, Revival was nominated for two JUNO Awards in the categories of Album of the Year and Adult Contemporary Album of the Year. On November 9, 2018, Reid released Revival Live, his first live album, which was recorded during the 2018 Revival Live Canadian tour.

== Musical theatre ==
In 2016, Reid first began working on a musical that was inspired by the real-life story of his grandmother, Maggie. Originally titled My Bonnie Lass, the show was developed by Canadian producer Michael Rubinoff at Sheridan College’s prestigious Canadian Music Theatre Project in 2018, followed by a staged workshop in 2019. The musical, retitled Maggie, premiered at Theatre Aquarius in Hamilton, Ontario in 2023, and then also played at the Charlottetown Festival and the Savoy Theatre. Later that year, a studio cast album was released that featured the cast of the Sheridan College workshop. In 2024, Maggie premiered in the United States where it played at the Goodspeed Opera House between August 23 and October 20, 2024.

== Discography ==
- Another Day, Another Dime (1997)
- Johnny Reid (2000)
- Born to Roll (2005)
- Kicking Stones (2007)
- Dance with Me (2009)
- A Place Called Love (2010)
- Fire It Up (2012)
- What Love Is All About (2015)
- Revival (2017)
- Revival Live (2018)
- My Kind of Christmas (2019)
- My Kind of Christmas - Deluxe Edition (2020)
- Love Someone (2021)

== Awards and nominations ==
Year	Association	Category	Result
2005	Canadian Country Music Association	Chevy Trucks Rising Star Award	Nominated
2005	Canadian Country Music Association	Independent Song of the Year — "You Still Own Me"	Won
2006	Canadian Country Music Association	Chevy Trucks Rising Star Award	Won
2006	Canadian Country Music Association	Single of the Year — "Missing an Angel"	Nominated
2006	Canadian Country Music Association	SOCAN Songwriter of the Year — "Missing an Angel"	Nominated
2006	Canadian Country Music Association	Independent Male Artist of the Year	Won
2006	Canadian Country Music Association	Independent Single of the Year — "Missing an Angel"	Won
2007	Canadian Country Music Association	Male Artist of the Year	Nominated
2007	Canadian Country Music Association	Independent Male Artist of the Year	Won
2008	Juno Awards of 2008	Country Recording of the Year — Kicking Stones	Nominated
2008	Canadian Country Music Association	Album of the Year — Kicking Stones	Nominated
2008	Canadian Country Music Association	Top Selling Canadian Album — Kicking Stones	Won
2008	Canadian Country Music Association	Male Artist of the Year	Won
2009	Canadian Country Music Association	Album of the Year — Dance with Me	Won
2009	Canadian Country Music Association	Video of the Year — "A Woman Like You"	Won
2009	Canadian Country Music Association	Male Artist of the Year	Won
2009	Canadian Country Music Association	Fan's Choice Award	Won
2009	Canadian Country Music Association	Single of the Year — "A Woman Like You"	Nominated
2009	Canadian Country Music Association	Songwriter of the Year — "A Woman Like You"	Won
2009	Canadian Country Music Association	Top Selling Canadian Album — Dance with Me	Won
2010	Juno Awards of 2010	Country Album of the Year — Dance with Me	Won
2010	Juno Awards of 2010	Album of the Year — Dance with Me	Nominated
2010	Juno Awards of 2010	Artist of the Year	Nominated
2010	Juno Awards of 2010	Juno Fan Choice Award	Nominated
2010	Canadian Country Music Association	Single of the Year — "Dance with Me"	Won
2010	Canadian Country Music Association	Video of the Year — "Dance with Me"	Nominated
2010	Canadian Country Music Association	Songwriter of the Year — "Dance with Me"	Won
2010	Canadian Country Music Association	Top Selling Canadian Album — Dance with Me	Won
2010	Canadian Country Music Association	Fans' Choice Award	Won
2010	Canadian Country Music Association	Male Artist of the Year	Nominated
2011	Juno Awards of 2011	Juno Fan Choice Award	Nominated
2011	Juno Awards of 2011	Artist of the Year	Nominated
2011	Juno Awards of 2011	Album of the Year — A Place Called Love	Nominated
2011	Juno Awards of 2011	Country Album of the Year — A Place Called Love	Won
2011	Canadian Country Music Association	Fans' Choice Award	Won
2011	Canadian Country Music Association	Male Artist of the Year	Won
2011	Canadian Country Music Association	Album of the Year — A Place Called Love	Nominated
2011	Canadian Country Music Association	Top Selling Canadian Album — A Place Called Love	Won
2011	Canadian Country Music Association	Single of the Year — "Today I'm Gonna Try and Change the World"	Nominated
2011	Canadian Country Music Association	Songwriter of the Year — "Today I'm Gonna Try and Change the World"	Nominated
2011	Canadian Country Music Association	Video of the Year — "Today I'm Gonna Try and Change the World"	Won
2012	Juno Awards of 2012	Single of the Year — "Let's Go Higher"	Nominated
2012	Canadian Country Music Association	Fans' Choice Award	Won
2012	Canadian Country Music Association	Male Artist of the Year	Nominated
2012	Canadian Country Music Association	Album of the Year — Fire It Up	Nominated
2012	Canadian Country Music Association	Top Selling Canadian Album — Fire It Up	Won
2012	Canadian Country Music Association	Single of the Year — "Fire It Up"	Nominated
2012	Canadian Country Music Association	Songwriter of the Year — "Fire It Up"	Nominated
2012	Canadian Country Music Association	Video of the Year — "Fire It Up"	Nominated
2012	Canadian Country Music Association	Interactive Artist of the Year	Nominated
2013	Juno Awards of 2013	Artist of the Year	Nominated
2013	Juno Awards of 2013	Country Album of the Year — Fire It Up	Won
2013	Juno Awards of 2013	Video of the Year — "Fire It Up"	Nominated
2013	Canadian Country Music Association	Fans' Choice Award	Nominated
2013	Canadian Country Music Association	Songwriter of the Year — "Baby I Know It"	Nominated
2013	Canadian Country Music Association	Top Selling Canadian Album — Fire It Up	Won
2014	Juno Awards of 2014	Adult Contemporary Album of the Year — A Christmas Gift to You	Won
2014	Canadian Country Music Association	Fans' Choice Award	Won
2014	Canadian Country Music Association	Interactive Artist of the Year	Nominated
2014	Canadian Country Music Association	Top Selling Canadian Album — A Christmas Gift to You	Won
2015	Canadian Country Music Association	Fans' Choice Award	Won
2016	SOCAN Awards	National Achievement Award	Won
2016	Canadian Country Music Association	Fan's Choice Award	Nominated
2016	Canadian Country Music Association	Male Artist of the Year	Nominated
2016	Canadian Country Music Association	CMT Video of the Year — "What Love Is All About"	Nominated
2017	Country Music Association of Ontario	Video of the Year — "What Love Is All About"	Nominated
2018	JUNO Awards of 2018	Album of the Year - Revival	Nominated
2018	JUNO Awards of 2018	Adult Contemporary Album of the Year - Revival	Nominated

== Band ==
- Ben Rutz (fiddle)
- Michael Shand (keyboards)
- Yvan Petit (lead guitar)
- Mark Selby (guitar)
- Charles Fields (drums/percussion)
- Nick Czarnogorski (bass) Regular session musician for Fatlabs studios. Also plays in a band named Ride The Tiger.
- Saidah Baba Talibah (backup vocals)
- Miku Graham (backup vocals)
- Quisha Wint (backup vocals)
- Jon Jackson (sax)
- Chris West (sax)
- Jon-Paul Frappier (trumpet)
- Oscar Utterstrom (trombone)
- Crystal Taliefero (percussion, sax, acoustic guitar, backup vocals) on the 2012 Fire It Up tour.
