= American Man: Greatest Hits Volume II =

Greatest hits album by Trace Adkins
- Released: December 4, 2007
- Genre: Country
- Length: 48:07
- Label: Capitol Nashville
- Producer: Frank Rogers

Trace Adkins chronology
Dangerous Man (2006)	American Man: Greatest Hits Volume II (2007)	X (2008)

Singles from American Man: Greatest Hits Volume II
- 1. "I Got My Game On" Released: August 2007; 2. "You're Gonna Miss This" Released: January 14, 2008

American Man: Greatest Hits Volume II is the second compilation album by American country music singer Trace Adkins. It was released on December 4, 2007. Adkins was originally scheduled to release a new studio album on that day but said in a press release: "We were already under some extremely tight deadlines as it was to make the street week," said Adkins. "I just was not able to get it all done because, to be honest, a pressing career opportunity came my way that I really wanted to take advantage of. As a result, I simply ran out of time."

The album features three new songs, including the lead single "I Got My Game On", which was later utilized as the theme song to Howie Long's Tough Guys show during the FOX Super Bowl XLII pre-game show. "You're Gonna Miss This" was the album's second single. As the fastest-climbing single of his career, it was also his longest-lasting Number One, spending three weeks at that position on the Billboard country charts, in addition to reaching the Top 20 both on the Billboard Hot 100 and Pop 100 charts.

The album debuted at number 22 on the U.S. Billboard 200 chart, selling about 53,000 copies in its first week.

The album also features "Chrome", which was previously featured on his first greatest hits record.

== Track listing ==
No.	Title	Writer(s)	Length
1.	"Ladies Love Country Boys"	Jamey Johnson, Rivers Rutherford, George Teren	3:42
2.	"I Got My Game On" (previously unreleased)	Jim Collins, Johnson, Teren	3:10
3.	"You're Gonna Miss This" (previously unreleased)	Ashley Gorley, Lee Thomas Miller	3:44
4.	"Honky Tonk Badonkadonk"	Dallas Davidson, Randy Houser, Johnson	3:59
5.	"Hot Mama"	Casey Beathard, Tom Shapiro	3:19
6.	"Rough & Ready"	Blair Mackichan, Brian Gene White, Craig Wiseman	3:10
7.	"Arlington"	Jeremy Spillman, Dave Turnbull	4:09
8.	"Songs About Me"	Shaye Smith, Ed Hill	3:23
9.	"Chrome"	Anthony Smith, Jeffrey Steele	3:23
10.	"I Wanna Feel Something"	Tony Lane, David Lee	3:48
11.	"Swing"	Frank Rogers, Chris Stapleton	3:39
12.	"American Man" (previously unreleased)	Tony Martin, Wendell Mobley, Neil Thrasher	4:13
13.	"I Came Here to Live"	Lane	4:28
Total length:			48:07

== Personnel on New Tracks ==
- Trace Adkins- lead vocals
- Mike Brignardello- bass guitar
- Pat Buchanan- electric guitar (track 12)
- J.T. Corenflos- electric guitar
- Eric Darken- percussion
- Shannon Forrest- drums (track 12)
- Kenny Greenberg- baritone guitar (track 2), electric guitar (tracks 2, 3)
- Paul Franklin- steel guitar
- Aubrey Haynie- fiddle (tracks 2, 12), mandolin (track 3)
- Wes Hightower- background vocals
- B. James Lowry- acoustic guitar (tracks 2, 3)
- Greg Morrow- drums (tracks 2, 3)
- Gordon Mote- Hammond organ (tracks 2, 12), keyboards (track 3), piano (tracks 2, 3)
- Bryan Sutton- banjo (track 12), 12-string guitar (track 12), acoustic guitar (track 12)

== Chart performance ==
=== Weekly charts ===
Chart (2007–08)	Peak position
US Billboard 200	22
US Top Country Albums (Billboard)	3

=== Year-end charts ===
Chart (2008)	Position
US Billboard 200	77
US Top Country Albums (Billboard)	15
Chart (2009)	Position
US Top Country Albums (Billboard)	58

=== Singles ===
Year	Single	Peak chart positions				Certifications (sales threshold)
Year	Single	US Country	US	US Pop	CAN	Certifications (sales threshold)
2007	"I Got My Game On"	34	—	—	—	
2008	"You're Gonna Miss This"	1	12	19	11	US: 2× Platinum
"—" denotes releases that did not chart

== Certifications ==
Region	Certification
United States (RIAA)	Platinum
