= Greatest Hits Collection, Vol. 1 =

Greatest hits album by Trace Adkins
- Released: July 8, 2003
- Genre: Country
- Length: 51:15
- Label: Capitol Nashville
- Producer: Various

Trace Adkins chronology
Chrome (2001)	Greatest Hits Collection, Vol. 1 (2003)	Comin' On Strong (2003)

Singles from Greatest Hits Collection, Vol. 1
- 1. "Then They Do" Released: March 10, 2003

Professional ratings
Review scores
Source	Rating
Allmusic	4/5 stars

Greatest Hits Collection, Vol. 1 is the first compilation album by American country music singer Trace Adkins. It was released on July 8, 2003 and features the greatest hits from his first four studio albums (1996's Dreamin' Out Loud, 1997's Big Time, 1999's More..., and 2001's Chrome). Also included on this compilation are the previously unreleased tracks "Then They Do" and "Welcome to Hell". The former was released as a single in 2003, reaching the Top 10 on the Billboard Hot Country Songs charts.

== Track listing ==
No.	Title	Writer(s)	Length
1.	"Then They Do" (previously unreleased)	Sunny Russ, Jim Collins	4:31
2.	"(This Ain't) No Thinkin' Thing"	Tim Nichols, Mark D. Sanders	4:02
3.	"The Rest of Mine"	Trace Adkins, Kenny Beard	3:14
4.	"Chrome"	Anthony Smith, Jeffrey Steele	3:22
5.	"I'm Tryin'"	Steele, Smith, Chris Wallin	4:45
6.	"There's a Girl in Texas"	Vip Vipperman, Adkins	3:32
7.	"Every Light in the House"	Kent Robbins	3:00
8.	"Don't Lie"	Chet Biggers, Frank Rogers	4:04
9.	"I Left Something Turned On at Home"	Billy Lawson, John Schweers	3:08
10.	"Big Time"	Larry Boone, Paul Nelson, Beard	3:50
11.	"Lonely Won't Leave Me Alone"	Jody Alan Sweet, Mary Danna	3:07
12.	"Help Me Understand"	Chris Farren, Steve Mac, Wayne Hector	3:51
13.	"More"	Del Gray, Thom McHugh	3:06
14.	"Welcome to Hell" (previously unreleased)	Adkins, Bobby Terry	3:43
Total length:			51:15

== Chart performance ==
=== Weekly charts ===
Chart (2003)	Peak position
US Billboard 200	9
US Top Country Albums (Billboard)	1

=== Year-end charts ===
Chart (2003)	Position
US Top Country Albums (Billboard)	33
Chart (2004)	Position
US Top Country Albums (Billboard)	47

=== Singles ===
Year	Single	Peak chart positions	
Year	Single	US Country	US
2003	"Then They Do"	9	52

== Certifications ==
Region	Certification
United States (RIAA)	Platinum
