= The Best of Kenny Rogers: Through the Years =

Compilation album by Kenny Rogers
- Released: September 21, 2018
- Genre: Country
- Length: 133:16
- Label: Capitol Records Nashville
- Producer: Larry Butler; David Foster; Rob Galbraith; Albhy Galuten; Barry Gibb; Randy Goodrum; Dann Huff; Kyle Lehning; Brent Maher; David Malloy; George Martin; Karl Richardson; Lionel Richie; Kenny Rogers

Kenny Rogers chronology
| Once Again It's Christmas (2015) | The Best of Kenny Rogers: Through the Years (2018) | Life Is Like a Song (2023) |

The Best of Kenny Rogers: Through the Years is a compilation album by American country music artist Kenny Rogers. The album was released on September 21, 2018, via Capitol Records Nashville.

The album was released to coincide with both the 40th anniversary of Rogers' landmark LP The Gambler and his 80th birthday. Following his death in March 2020, the album surged in popularity and returned Rogers to the top of the country albums chart for the first time in more than three decades.

== Background ==
The Best of Kenny Rogers: Through the Years serves as a career-spanning collection that pays tribute to Rogers' legacy.

Among the featured tracks are chart-topping singles such as "The Gambler," "Lucille," "Coward of the County," "She Believes in Me," "You Decorated My Life," and "Lady," the latter a 1981 duet written and produced by Lionel Richie. The collection also includes notable collaborations with artists like Dottie West ("What Are We Doin' in Love"), Sheena Easton ("We've Got Tonight"), Kim Carnes ("Don't Fall in Love with a Dreamer") and Ronnie Milsap ("Make No Mistake, She's Mine").

Critics noted the album's omission of a few major hits, most notably "Islands in the Stream," Rogers 1983 number one duet with Dolly Parton, and "Ruby, Don't Take Your Love to Town," a hit from Rogers earlier work with the First Edition.

== Critical reception ==
Following Rogers' death on March 20, 2020, The Best of Kenny Rogers: Through the Years debuted at number one on the Billboard Top Country Albums chart for the week of April 4, 2020. It marked Rogers' first chart-topping album since The Heart of the Matter in 1985, and his 12th overall number one album.

The album also entered the Billboard 200 at number nine, his highest position on the all-genre chart since 1983. In the tracking week ending March 26, the compilation earned 32,000 equivalent album units, including 10,000 traditional album sales, 13,000 in streaming equivalent units, and 8,000 in track equivalent units.

Its resurgence placed Rogers above several contemporary artists on the chart that week, including Luke Combs and Kelsea Ballerini. The chart-topping performance was widely seen as a testament to Rogers' enduring appeal and the timelessness of his music, particularly as fans revisited his catalog during the early weeks of the COVID-19 pandemic.

== Track listing ==
The Best of Kenny Rogers: Through the Years track listing
| No. | Title | Writer(s) | Producer(s) | Length |
|---|---|---|---|---|
| 1. | "Lucille" | Roger Bowling; Hal Bynum | Larry Butler | 3:41 |
| 2. | "Daytime Friends" | Ben Peters | Butler | 3:09 |
| 3. | "Love or Something Like It" | Steve Glassmeyer; Kenny Rogers | Butler | 2:50 |
| 4. | "The Gambler" | Don Schlitz | Butler | 3:30 |
| 5. | "She Believes in Me" | Steve Gibb | Butler | 4:11 |
| 6. | "Coward of the County" | Roger Bowling; Billy Edd Wheeler | Butler | 4:19 |
| 7. | "You Decorated My Life" | Debbie Hupp; Bob Morrison | Butler | 3:37 |
| 8. | "Don't Fall in Love with a Dreamer" (with Kim Carnes) | Kim Carnes; David Ellingson | Butler; Rogers | 3:40 |
| 9. | "Love the World Away" | Morrison; Johnny Wilson | Butler; Lionel Richie | 3:11 |
| 10. | "Lady" | Richie | Richie | 3:52 |
| 11. | "What Are We Doin' in Love" (with Dottie West) | Randy Goodrum | Goodrum; Brent Maher | 3:00 |
| 12. | "I Don't Need You" | Rich Christian | Richie | 3:26 |
| 13. | "Through the Years" | Steve Dorff; Marty Panzer | Richie | 4:22 |
| 14. | "Love Will Turn You Around" | Rogers; David Malloy; Thom Schuyler; Even Stevens | Rogers; Malloy | 3:37 |
| 15. | "We've Got Tonight" (with Sheena Easton) | Bob Seger | David Foster; Rogers | 3:49 |
| 16. | "This Woman" | Albhy Galuten; Barry Gibb | Galuten; Gibb; Karl Richardson | 3:58 |
| 17. | "Crazy" | Richard Marx; Rogers | Foster | 3:41 |
| 18. | "Morning Desire" | Dave Loggins | George Martin | 4:05 |
| 19. | "Make No Mistake, She's Mine" (with Ronnie Milsap) | Kim Carnes | Rob Galbraith; Kyle Lehning | 3:56 |
| 20. | "I Can't Unlove You" | Wade Kirby; Will Robinson | Dann Huff | 3:24 |
| Total length: | | | | 133:16 |

== Charts ==
Weekly chart performance for The Best of Kenny Rogers: Through the Years
| Chart (2020) | Peak position |
|---|---|
| Canadian Albums (Billboard) | 12 |
| US Billboard 200 | 9 |
| US Top Country Albums (Billboard) | 1 |
