= Once Again It's Christmas =

Studio album by Kenny Rogers
- Released: September 25, 2015
- Studio: Blackbird Studio, The Compound and Sound Stage Studios (Nashville, Tennessee); Skyland Studios (Lakeville, Minnesota); Kung Fu Bakery (Portland, Oregon)
- Genre: Country
- Length: 41:04
- Label: Warner Music Nashville
- Producer: Jim Brickman; Warren Hartman; Kyle Lehning; Darren Rust; Steve Sundholm

Kenny Rogers chronology
You Can't Make Old Friends (2013)	Once Again It's Christmas (2015)	The Best of Kenny Rogers: Through the Years (2018)

Rogers' Christmas chronology
Christmas From The Heart (1998)	Once Again It's Christmas (2015)

Once Again It's Christmas is the 28th studio album by Kenny Rogers, released in 2015. A holiday album, it features such musical acts as Alison Krauss, Winfield's Locket and Jennifer Nettles. As of January 2016, 34,900 copies were sold in the United States.

== Track listing ==
No.	Title	Writer(s)	Length
1.	"Once Again It's Christmas" (featuring Larry Hall)	Don Russell	3:56
2.	"There's a New Kid in Town" (featuring Winfield's Locket)	Don Cook, Curly Putman, Keith Whitley	3:50
3.	"Here It Is Christmas/Baby, It's Cold Outside" (featuring Larry Hall and Jennifer Nettles)	Frank Loesser, Kenny Rogers	2:55
4.	"Little Drummer Boy" (featuring Larry Hall)	Henry Onorati, Harry Simeone	3:20
5.	"Back to Bethlehem"	Joe Collins, Joe Doyle	3:41
6.	"Winter Wonderland"	Felix Bernard, Richard B. Smith	3:49
7.	"Some Children See Him" (featuring Larry Hall and Alison Krauss)	Alfred Burt, Wihla Hutson	4:23
8.	"I'll Be Home for Christmas" (featuring Larry Hall)	Kim Gannon, Walter Kent, Buck Ram	2:46
9.	"Children, Go Where I Send Thee" (featuring Home Free)	Traditional	4:34
10.	"That Silent Night" (featuring Jim Brickman)	Jim Brickman, Tom Douglas	3:42
11.	"The Light"	Steve Glassmeyer, Warren Hartman, Rogers	4:08
Total length:			41:04

== Personnel ==
- Kenny Rogers – lead vocals
- Pat Coil – acoustic piano (1, 3, 4, 8), Rhodes electric piano (2), synthesizers (2, 11), Hammond B3 organ (5, 6, 11)
- John Hobbs – Rhodes electric piano (1, 3–6, 8), acoustic piano (2, 11), synthesizers (4)
- Matt Rollings – acoustic piano (7)
- Jim Brickman – acoustic piano (10)
- Troy Welstad – Hammond B3 organ (10)
- Steve Sundholm – programming (10)
- Brent Mason – electric guitar (1–6, 11)
- John Willis – acoustic guitar (1–8, 11)
- Bryan Sutton – acoustic guitar (2, 5, 7), mandocello (4)
- Randy Dorman – electric guitar (8)
- Tim Ellis – acoustic guitar (10), electric guitar (10)
- Keith Sommers – electric guitar (10)
- Russ Pahl – pedal steel guitar (2, 5)
- Paul Brainard – pedal steel guitar (10)
- Viktor Krauss – bass (1–8, 11)
- Colby Hendricks – bass (10)
- Steve Brewster – drums (2–6, 8, 11)
- Mike Braun – drums (10)
- Eric Darken – percussion (1, 5, 7, 8, 11)
- Pat Bergeson – harmonica (1)
- Denis Solee – tenor saxophone (6)
- George Tidwell – trumpet (6)
- Warren Hartman – arrangements (1–7, 9, 11)
- Larry Hall – orchestra (2–4, 7, 8, 11), orchestral arrangements (3, 4, 7, 8)
- Bergen White – orchestral arrangements (2, 11), harmony vocal arrangements (4)
- Darren Rust – arrangements (9)
- Ted Sampson – additional vocal concept arrangement (11)
- Winfield's Locket – vocals (2)
- Jennifer Nettles – vocals (3)
- Alison Krauss – vocals (7)
- Home Free – vocals (9)

Harmony vocals

- Tania Hancheroff (1, 4–6, 11)
- Mark Ivey (1, 4, 11)
- Shane McConnell (1, 4, 11)
- Lisa Silver (1, 4, 11)
- Kira Small (1, 4, 11)
- Bergen White (1, 4, 11)
- Perry Coleman (2, 5)
- Vicki Hampton (5, 6)
- Cindy Walker (5, 6)
- Rachel Hamar (10)
- Michelle Sundholm (10)
- Steve Sundholm (10)

== Production ==
- Rebekah Gordon – A&R direction
- Jason Henke – A&R direction
- Cris Lacy – A&R direction
- Warren Hartman – producer (1–8, 11)
- Kyle Lehning – producer (1–8, 11)
- Darren Rust – producer (9)
- Steve Sundholm – producer (9)
- Jim Brickman – producer (10)
- Paige Connors – production coordinator
- Katherine Petillo – art direction, design
- Shane Tarleton – creative director
- Piper Ferguson – photography
- Kenny Rogers – cover photography
- Bob Burwell, Jason Henke and Ken Levitan for Vector Management – personal management
- Kevin Dalton and Dwight Wiles for Smith Wiles & Co. – business management
- Lisa Ray – brand management
- Greg Oswald for WME Entertainment – booking

Technical credits

- Hank Williams – mastering at MasterMix (Nashville, Tennessee)
- Casey Wood – recording (1–8, 11)
- Kyle Lehning – mixing (1–8, 11)
- Jordan Lehning – vocal recording (1–8, 11), digital editing (1–8, 11), recording assistant (9)
- Kevin Sokolnicki – vocal recording (1–8, 11), additional recording (1–8, 11)
- Darren Rust – recording (9), mixing (9)
- Steve Sundholm – mixing (10)
- Chris Ashburn – recording assistant (1–8, 11)
- Shawn Daugherty – recording assistant (1–8, 11)
- Justin Francis – recording assistant (1–8, 11)
- Jason Mott – recording assistant (1–8, 11)

== Chart performance ==
=== Weekly charts ===
Chart (2015–16)	Peak position
US Billboard 200	197
US Top Christian Albums (Billboard)	5
US Top Country Albums (Billboard)	17
US Holiday Albums (Billboard)	3

=== Year-end charts ===
Chart (2016)	Position
US Christian Albums (Billboard)	45
US Top Country Albums (Billboard)	66
