= Life Is Like a Song =

Studio album by Kenny Rogers
- Released: June 2, 2023
- Recorded: 2008–2011
- Genre: Country
- Length: 36:27
- Label: UMe
- Producer: Wanda Rogers, Ken Levitan, Jason Henke

Kenny Rogers chronology
The Best of Kenny Rogers: Through the Years (2018)	Life Is Like a Song (2023)

Singles from Life Is Like a Song
- 1. "Love Is a Drug" Released: April 12, 2023; 2. "I Wish It Would Rain" Released: April 12, 2023

Life Is Like a Song is the 29th and final studio album by American country music singer Kenny Rogers. It was released on June 2, 2023, by UMe. The album marks Rogers' first non-Christmas studio album in ten years, since the 2013 release of You Can't Make Old Friends. The album features ten tracks, including eight previously unreleased songs from the Kenny Rogers vault that were recorded from 2008 to 2011. "Tell Me That You Love Me" and "Goodbye" were previously released in 2009 on the Time Life box set, The First 50 Years, although "Tell Me That You Love Me" has been remixed for this album.

== Track listing ==
Life Is Like a Song track listing
No.	Title	Writer(s)	Length
1.	"Love Is a Drug"	Josh Leo; Tim Nichols; Kim Carnes	2:58
2.	"I Wish It Would Rain"	Norman Whitfield; Barrett Strong; Rodger Penzabene	3:02
3.	"Am I Too Late" (with Kim Keyes)	Jim Hurt; Larry Keith	3:28
4.	"Tell Me That You Love Me" (with Dolly Parton)	Buffy Lawson; Eric Pittarelli; Todd Cerney	3:13
5.	"Straight Into Love" (with Jamie O'Neal)	Jimmy Rankin; Patricia Conroy	4:01
6.	"Wonderful Tonight"	Eric Clapton	3:26
7.	"Catchin' Grasshoppers"	Laura McCall Torno; Earl Torno	4:09
8.	"That's Love to Me"	Gary Burr; Jim Photoglo	3:43
9.	"I Will Wait for You"	Norman Gimbel; Michel Legrand; Jacques Demy	5:06
10.	"Goodbye"	Lionel Richie	3:21
Total length:			36:27

Digital deluxe and Target edition bonus tracks
No.	Title	Writer(s)	Length
11.	"Say Hello to Heaven"	Buddy Hyatt	3:39
12.	"At Last"	Mack Gordon; Harry Warren	2:47
Total length:			42:53
