= No Place to Hide =

No Place to Hide may refer to:

== Film, television and radio ==
- No Place to Hide (1956 film)
- No Place to Hide (1973 film) or Rebel
- No Place to Hide (1981 film), a TV film
- No Place to Hide (1993 film), a film with Kris Kristofferson
- "No Place to Hide" (Lost in Space), the 1965 pilot episode of Lost in Space
- "No Place to Hide" (ER), an episode of ER
- "No Place to Hide", a 1959 episode of The DuPont Show with June Allyson
- No Place to Hide, a South African science-fiction serial drama running on Springbok Radio from 1958 to 1970

== Literature ==
- No Place to Hide (Bradley book), a 1948 book on nuclear fallout by David J. Bradley
- No Place to Hide (Greenwald book), a 2014 book by Glenn Greenwald
- No Place to Hide, a 2005 book by Robert O'Harrow, Jr., featured on The Daily Show in 2006

== Music ==
=== Albums ===
- No Place To Hide, a 1981 album by Gail Zeiler
- No Place to Hide, a 2002 jazz album by Ron Eschete and Mort Weiss

=== Songs ===
- "No Place to Hide" (song), a 1996 song by Korn
- "No Place To Hide", a song by Ash first released as the B-side to "There's A Star"
- "No Place To Hide", a 1985 song by The Cynics
- "No Place to Hide", a 2002 song by Forgotten Rebels
- "No Place to Hide" or "Wudi Zirong", a song by Heibao from Heibao
- "(There's) No Place To Hide", a song by Ben E. King first released on What Is Soul
- "No Place to Hide", a song by Alison Krauss & Union Station from So Long So Wrong
- "No Place to Hide", a song by Sérgio Mendes from Brasil '86
- "No Place to Hide", a song by Declan O'Rourke from Since Kyabram
- "No Place to Hide", a song by Parlotones from Radiocontrolledrobot
- "No Place to Hide", a 2010 song by Winfield's Locket

== See also ==
- Nowhere to Hide (disambiguation)
