= Chrome (Trace Adkins album) =

Studio album by Trace Adkins
- Released: October 9, 2001
- Recorded: 2001
- Genre: Country
- Length: 46:16
- Label: Capitol Nashville
- Producer: Trey Bruce; Dann Huff

Trace Adkins chronology
| More... (1999) | Chrome (2001) | Greatest Hits Collection, Vol. 1 (2003) |

Singles from Chrome
- 1. "I'm Tryin'" Released: July 2, 2001; 2. "Help Me Understand" Released: March 2, 2002; 3. "Chrome" Released: September 16, 2002

Professional ratings
Review scores
| Source | Rating |
|---|---|
| Allmusic | 3/5 stars |

Chrome is the fourth studio album by American country music singer Trace Adkins. It was released on October 9, 2001, on Capitol Records Nashville. The album produced three singles for Adkins on the Billboard Hot Country Songs charts: "I'm Tryin'" at No. 6, "Help Me Understand" at No. 17, and the title track at No. 10. It has also been certified gold by the RIAA. The album was produced by Trey Bruce (tracks 3, 5–8, 10, 11) and Dann Huff (tracks 1, 2, 4, 9, 12).

The album's title track was later covered by Jeffrey Steele on his 2003 album Gold, Platinum, Chrome, and Steele.

== Track listing ==
| No. | Title | Writer(s) | Length |
|---|---|---|---|
| 1. | "Chrome" | Anthony Smith, Jeffrey Steele | 3:22 |
| 2. | "Help Me Understand" | Chris Farren, Steve Mac, Wayne Hector | 3:51 |
| 3. | "Once Upon a Fool Ago" | Sonny Tillis, Ned McElroy | 4:28 |
| 4. | "I'm Tryin'" | Steele, Smith, Chris Wallin | 4:45 |
| 5. | "Thankful Man" | Stephen Allen Davis | 3:28 |
| 6. | "I'm Payin' for It Now" | Trace Adkins, Trey Bruce | 3:52 |
| 7. | "And There Was You" | Tom Shapiro, Mark Nesler | 3:38 |
| 8. | "Come Home" | Ed Hill, Bob DiPiero, Mark D. Sanders | 3:31 |
| 9. | "Scream" | Jim Collins, Marc Beeson | 4:04 |
| 10. | "I'm Goin' Back" | Craig Wiseman, Bobby Terry, Catt Gravitt | 4:07 |
| 11. | "Give Me You" | Casey Beathard, Kevin Horne | 3:24 |
| 12. | "Love Me Like There's No Tomorrow" | Collins, Beeson | 3:47 |
| Total length: | | | 46:25 |

== Personnel ==
Adapted from Chrome liner notes.

- Tim Akers – keyboards (2, 12)
- Mike Brignardello – bass guitar (1, 2, 4, 9, 12)
- Trey Bruce – programming (3, 7, 8, 10, 11), percussion (5)
- Pat Buchanan – electric guitar (3, 5, 6, 7, 8, 10, 11)
- Tim Coats – Jew's harp (10)
- J. T. Corenflos – electric guitar (3, 6, 7, 8, 10)
- Eric Darken – percussion (2, 4, 9)
- Thom Flora – background vocals (5, 11)
- Larry Franklin – fiddle (1, 2)
- Paul Franklin – steel guitar (1, 2, 4, 9, 12)
- Tony Harrell – piano (3, 5, 6, 7, 8, 11), Hammond B-3 organ (8), accordion (10)
- Aubrey Haynie – fiddle (12)
- Wes Hightower – background vocals (3, 6, 7, 8, 10)
- Steve Hinson – steel guitar (3, 5, 6, 7, 8, 10, 11)
- John Hobbs – piano (1), keyboards (2)
- Dann Huff – electric guitar (1, 2, 4, 9, 12)
- B. James Lowry – acoustic guitar (4, 9, 12)
- Brent Mason – electric guitar (1, 2, 4, 9)
- Chris McHugh – drums (1, 2)
- Jerry McPherson – electric guitar (12)
- Greg Morrow – drums (3, 5, 6, 7, 8, 10, 11)
- Steve Nathan – keyboards (4, 9)
- Alison Prestwood – bass guitar (3, 5, 6, 7, 8, 10, 11)
- Chris Rodriguez – background vocals (8, 10)
- Matt Rollings – keyboards (12)
- Brian Siewert – synthesizer (3, 5, 6, 7, 8, 10, 11)
- Michael Spriggs – acoustic guitar (3, 5, 6, 7, 8, 10, 11)
- Russell Terrell – background vocals (1, 2, 4, 5, 9, 11, 12)
- Biff Watson – acoustic guitar (1, 2)
- Lonnie Wilson – drums (4, 9, 12)
- Curtis Wright – background vocals (3, 6, 7)
- Jonathan Yudkin – violin (3, 4, 5, 6, 7, 11), mandolin (3), cello (4), mandocello (4), strings (8), wah-wah fiddle (9), fiddle (10)

=== Technical ===
Tracks 1, 2, 4, 9, 12

- Jeff Balding – recording, mixing
- Mark Hagen – recording
- Dann Huff – producer
- Shawn Simpson – digital editing

Tracks 3, 5–8, 10, 11

- Trey Bruce – producer
- David Buchanan – recording
- Greg Droman – mixing (tracks 5 and 11 only)
- Jason Garner – engineering
- John Kunz – engineering
- Mike Shipley – mixing (except 5 and 11)
- Luke Wooten – engineering

All tracks mastered by Glenn Meadows

== Chart performance ==
=== Weekly charts ===
| Chart (2001) | Peak position |
|---|---|
| US Billboard 200 | 59 |
| US Top Country Albums (Billboard) | 4 |

=== Year-end charts ===
| Chart (2002) | Position |
|---|---|
| US Top Country Albums (Billboard) | 34 |
| Chart (2003) | Position |
| US Top Country Albums (Billboard) | 43 |

=== Singles ===
| Year | Single | Peak chart positions | |
| Year | Single | US Country | US |
|---|---|---|---|
| 2001 | "I'm Tryin'" | 6 | 44 |
| 2002 | "Help Me Understand" | 17 | 80 |
| 2002 | "Chrome" | 10 | 74 |

== Certifications ==
| Region | Certification |
|---|---|
| United States (RIAA) | Gold |
