= Love Lifted Me =

1912 hymn

- by Howard E. Smith
- Genre: Hymn
- Written: 1912
- Text: James Rowe
- Language: English
- Based on: Matthew 14:22
- Meter: 7.6.7.6.7.6.7.4 with refrain
- Melody: Safety

"Love Lifted Me" is a hymn first published in 1912, with text by English-American lyricist James Rowe and melody by American organist Howard E. Smith.

== History ==
James Rowe, son of an English copper miner, was born in 1865 and emigrated from England to the United States of America in 1889.

The hymn's lyrics are inspired primarily by the 14th chapter of the Gospel of Matthew, wherein the Twelve Apostles, when caught in a storm, see Jesus appearing to walk on water. In the account, Saint Peter attempts to walk toward Jesus while in the water, but begins to sink. Also referenced in the hymn is the same gospel's eighth chapter, wherein Jesus calms a storm after being awakened by the Apostles. Rowe's lyrics use the former as a metaphor for a narrator who is "sinking deep in sin" before being redeemed.

Little is known about composer Howard E. Smith. He was a church organist from Connecticut. Although he suffered from arthritis at the time of the composition, he was able to compose the hymn's melody while sitting at a piano with Rowe.

According to the database Hymnary.org, "Love Lifted Me" has been published in over 246 hymnals.

== Kenny Rogers version ==
"Love Lifted Me"

Single by Kenny Rogers

from the album Love Lifted Me
- B-side: "Homemade Love"
- Released: December 1975
- Genre: Country
- Length: 3:48
- Label: United Artists
- Songwriters: James Rowe; Howard E. Smith; Kenny Rogers
- Producer: Larry Butler

Kenny Rogers singles chronology
"Here's That Rainy Day" (1975)	"Love Lifted Me" (1975)	"While the Feeling's Good" (1976)

In late 1975, American country music singer Kenny Rogers recorded an adaptation of "Love Lifted Me" for an album of the same name. Rogers' version kept the original refrain but rewrote the verses from a secular viewpoint. Released in December 1975 with "Homemade Love" as the B-side, Rogers' version charted on the Billboard Hot Country Singles chart for 19 weeks, peaking at number 19 early in 1976.

In 1981, Kenny also sang the original hymn in the opening scenes of the Dick Lowry movie, Coward of the County, where he played the uncle of the titular character who is also the pastor of a church.

=== Chart performance ===
Chart (1975–1976)	Peak position
US Hot Country Songs (Billboard)	19
US Billboard Hot 100	97
Canadian RPM Country Tracks	25

== Te Aroha ==
New Zealand composer and kapa haka leader Morvin Simon set Te Aroha, a brief song extolling love, faith and peace, to the tune of the chorus of Love Lifted Me. Te Aroha is often sung at gatherings in New Zealand or by groups arriving at a marae.
