= If That Ain't Country =

Studio album by Anthony Smith
- Released: June 25, 2002
- Genre: Country
- Label: Mercury Nashville
- Producer: Bobby Terry

Anthony Smith chronology
If That Ain't Country (2002)	Sunshine (EP) (2009)

If That Ain't Country is the debut studio album by American country music artist Anthony Smith. It was released in 2002 on Mercury Nashville Records as his only studio album. Three singles were released from it: the title track, followed by "John J. Blanchard" and "Half a Man". Respectively, these reached 26, 40 and 40 on the Hot Country Songs charts.

== Content ==
Two of this album's tracks were previously recorded by other artists: "John J. Blanchard" by Tommy Shane Steiner on his 2002 debut album Then Came the Night under the title "The Mind of John J. Blanchard", and "What Brothers Do" by Confederate Railroad from their 2001 album Unleashed. Confederate Railroad also released this song as a single that year. Two more would later be recorded by other artists as well. Sammy Kershaw recorded "Metropolis" on his 2003 album I Want My Money Back, as did Trace Adkins on his 2005 album Songs About Me, while Trisha Yearwood recorded "Who Invented the Wheel" on her 2005 album Jasper County. Kenny Rogers covered "Half a Man" on his 2006 album Water & Bridges.

== Critical reception ==
Shelly Fabian of About.com gave the album a five-star review, saying in her review "With 12 awesome tracks and a wonderful baritone voice, Anthony Smith is decidedly modern while also having some 'outlaw' country tendencies." Dan MacIntosh of Country Standard Time gave a positive review, saying that Smith "writes and sings songs with an expressively blues-y voice, voicing lyrics that incorporate plenty of humor and real heart."

== Track listing ==
No.	Title	Writer(s)	Length
1.	"Who Invented the Wheel"	Anthony Smith, Craig Wiseman, Bobby Terry	3:32
2.	"If That Ain't Country"	Smith, Jeffrey Steele	3:52
3.	"John J. Blanchard"	Smith, Chris Wallin	3:56
4.	"Impossible to Do"	Smith, Wallin, Tony Lane	4:35
5.	"Half a Man"	Smith	3:05
6.	"Metropolis"	Smith, Wallin	3:13
7.	"Up to the Depth"	Smith, Wallin, Terry	4:19
8.	"Airborn"	Smith	3:58
9.	"What Brothers Do"	Smith, Wallin	4:03
10.	"Hell of a Question"	Smith, John Burchett	4:09
11.	"Venus"	Smith, Wallin	3:33
12.	"Infinity"	Smith	4:08

== Personnel ==
As listed in liner notes.

- Shannon Forest – drums
- Mark Hammond – drum loops
- Shelby Kennedy – background vocals on "Venus"
- Jami McMahon – background vocals on "Infinity" and "If That Ain't Country"
- Russell Terrell – background vocals
- Anthony Smith – vocals; electric guitar on "Impossible to Do"
- Bobby Terry – background vocals, all other instruments
- Darrell Franklin, Catt Gravitt, Scott Gunter, Jill Terry – background vocals on "If That Ain't Country"
- David Angell, David Davidson, Carl Gorodetzky, Pam Sixfin, Mary Kathryn Vanosdale – violins on "Metropolis" and "Up to the Depth"
- Kris Wilkinson – viola on "Metropolis" and "Up to the Depth"
- John Catchings, Bob Mason – cellos on "Metropolis" and "Up to the Depth"

== Chart performance ==
Chart (2002)	Peak position
U.S. Billboard Top Country Albums	26
U.S. Billboard Top Heatseekers	16
