= Then They Do =

Single by Trace Adkins

from the album Greatest Hits Collection, Vol. 1
- Released: March 10, 2003
- Recorded: 2002
- Genre: Country
- Length: 4:31
- Label: Capitol Nashville
- Songwriters: Jim Collins, Sunny Russ
- Producer: Scott Hendricks

Trace Adkins singles chronology
| "Chrome" (2002) | "Then They Do" (2003) | "Hot Mama" (2003) |

"Then They Do" is a song written by Jim Collins and Sunny Russ and recorded by American country music artist Trace Adkins. It was released in March 2003 as the first and only single from his compilation album Greatest Hits Collection, Vol. 1.

== Content ==
In the first verse, the protagonist describes a typical morning where his children are causing trouble on the way to school, and thinks things will be easier when the children grow up. Once the children have all gone off to college and gotten married, their parents realize that they have more time to themselves now that their children have accomplished their dreams, but their house and lives feel a lot emptier nonetheless.

== Music video ==
The music video was directed by Deaton Flanigen and premiered in early 2003.

== Chart positions ==
"Then They Do" debuted at number 52 on the U.S. Billboard Hot Country Songs for the week of March 15, 2003.

| Chart (2003) | Peak position |
|---|---|
| US Hot Country Songs (Billboard) | 9 |
| US Billboard Hot 100 | 52 |

=== Year-end charts ===
| Chart (2003) | Position |
|---|---|
| US Country Songs (Billboard) | 37 |

== Susie Luchsinger cover ==
In 2005, the song was released by Susie Luchsinger on her album Count It All Joy, with more instrumental aid.
