= X (Trace Adkins album) =

Studio album by Trace Adkins
- Released: November 25, 2008
- Genre: Country
- Length: 45:04
- Label: Capitol Nashville
- Producer: Frank Rogers

Trace Adkins chronology
American Man: Greatest Hits Volume II (2007)	X (2008)	Cowboy's Back in Town (2010)

Singles from X
- 1. "Muddy Water" Released: August 4, 2008; 2. "Marry for Money" Released: January 12, 2009; 3. "All I Ask For Anymore" Released: May 18, 2009

Professional ratings
Review scores
Source	Rating
Allmusic	3.5/5 stars
Slant	3/5 stars

X is the eighth studio album by American country music artist Trace Adkins. The album's name is the Roman numeral for ten, as counting his two Greatest Hits packages it is his tenth album overall. X was released November 25, 2008, on Capitol Records Nashville. The album includes the singles "Muddy Water", "Marry for Money", and "All I Ask For Anymore", all of which have charted in the Top 40 on Hot Country Songs, with the latter two becoming Top 20 hits.

== Other songs ==
After Adkins performed a moving version of "'Til the Last Shot's Fired" with The West Point Cadet Glee Club live at the Academy of Country Music Awards in 2009, the song received unsolicited airplay which brought it to No. 50 on the U.S. Billboard Hot Country Songs chart while "Marry for Money" was charting. It also peaked at No. 5 on the Bubbling Under Hot 100.

Although considered one of the highlights of the album by critics and fans, "I Can't Outrun You" was not released as a single, although it received a music video treatment. It was later covered by Thompson Square on their 2013 album Just Feels Good, whose version was released to country radio on June 23, 2014, and reached a peak of number 52 on the Billboard Country Airplay chart. It was also covered by the country acapella band Home Free in 2017 with a video.

== Track listing ==
No.	Title	Writer(s)	Length
1.	"Sweet"	Kelly Garrett, Kendell Marvel, Tim Owens	3:07
2.	"Happy to Be Here"	Patrick Jason Matthews, Jim McCormick, Michael Mobley	3:15
3.	"All I Ask For Anymore"	Casey Beathard, Tim James	3:57
4.	"Let's Do That Again"	Jim Beavers, Chris DuBois, Chris Stapleton	3:41
5.	"Hauling One Thing"	Monty Criswell, Tim Mensy	3:34
6.	"Better Than I Thought It'd Be"	Jay Knowles, Marvel	3:41
7.	"Marry for Money"	Jimmy Melton, Dave Turnbull	3:04
8.	"Til the Last Shot's Fired"	Rob Crosby, Doug Johnson	4:59
9.	"I Can't Outrun You"	Ben Glover, Kyle Jacobs, Joe Leathers	3:36
10.	"Hillbilly Rich"	David Frasier, David Lee, Johnny Park	3:31
11.	"Sometimes a Man Takes a Drink"	Larry Cordle, Amanda Martin	4:44
12.	"Muddy Water"	Criswell, Rick Huckaby	3:55
Total length:			45:04

iTunes Exclusive
No.	Title	Writer(s)	Length
13.	"In Color"	Jamey Johnson, Lee Thomas Miller, James Otto	4:04
Total length:			49:08

== Personnel ==
- Trace Adkins - lead vocals
- Pat Bergeson - acoustic guitar
- Mike Brignardello - bass guitar
- Jim "Moose" Brown - clavinet, Hammond B-3 organ, keyboards, piano
- Pat Buchanan - baritone guitar, electric guitar, harp
- John Catchings - cello
- J.T. Corenflos - baritone guitar, electric guitar
- Eric Darken- percussion
- Shannon Forrest - drums
- Paul Franklin - steel guitar
- Kenny Greenberg - baritone guitar, electric guitar
- Aubrey Haynie - fiddle, mandolin
- Wes Hightower - background vocals
- John Hobbs - conductor, string arrangements
- Dann Huff - electric guitar
- Ben Issacs - background vocals
- Sonya Issacs - background vocals
- Mike Johnson - dobro, steel guitar
- Love Sponge String Quartet- strings
- B. James Lowry - acoustic guitar
- Greg Morrow - drums
- Gordon Mote - Hammond B-3 organ, piano
- Frank Rogers - banjo, electric guitar
- Bryan Sutton - banjo, acoustic guitar, national steel guitar
- Ilya Toshinsky - banjo
- West Point Cadet Glee Club - background vocals

== Chart performance ==
=== Weekly charts ===
Chart (2008)	Peak position
US Billboard 200	32
US Top Country Albums (Billboard)	7

=== Year-end charts ===
Chart (2009)	Position
US Billboard 200	195
US Top Country Albums (Billboard)	30

=== Singles ===
Year	Single	Peak chart positions		
Year	Single	US Country	US	CAN
2008	"Muddy Water"	22	109	—
2009	"Marry for Money"	14	98	84
2009	"All I Ask For Anymore"	14	95	—
"—" denotes releases that did not chart

=== Other charted songs ===
Year	Single	Peak chart positions	
Year	Single	US Country	US
2009	"'Til the Last Shot's Fired"	50	105
