= Vote for Love =

Studio album by Kenny Rogers
- Released: January 2, 1996
- Recorded: 1995
- Studio: Creative Recording and Seventeen Grand Recording (Nashville, Tennessee); Candock Recording Studio (Myrtle Beach, South Carolina)
- Genre: Country
- Length: 54:19 (Disc 1); 51:05 (Disc 2); 1:45:24 (Total)
- Label: QvC
- Producer: Jim McKell; Bergen White

Vote for Love is a 1996 album by Kenny Rogers released exclusively for sale on QVC. It was later made available in retail stores under the title Always & Forever.

== Track listing ==
=== Disc 1 ===
1. "Have I Told You Lately" (Van Morrison) [4:55]
  - (previously released by Van Morrison on the 1989 album Avalon Sunset)
2. "As Time Goes By" (Herman Hupfeld) [2:51]
  - (previously recorded by Rudy Vallee in 1931 and re-released in 1943)
  - (used by Dooley Wilson in the 1942 film Casablanca)
3. "Endless Love" (Lionel Richie) [3:50]
  - (previously recorded by Lionel Richie and Diana Ross on the 1981 album Endless Love: The Original Motion Picture Soundtrack)
4. "Unforgettable" (Irving Gordon) [3:21]
  - (previously recorded by Nat King Cole on the 1951 album Penthouse Serenade)
5. "I Only Have Eyes for You" (Harry Warren, Al Dubin) [4:21]
  - (previously recorded by The Flamingos on the 1959 album Flamingo Serenade)
  - (originally written for the 1934 film Dames)
6. "Evergreen" (Barbra Streisand, Paul Williams) [3:35]
  - (previously recorded by Barbra Streisand on the 1976 soundtrack A Star Is Born)
7. "Misty" (Johnny Burke, Erroll Garner) [3:18]
  - (previously recorded by Johnny Mathis on the 1959 album Heavenly)
  - (previously recorded by Ray Stevens on the 1975 album Misty)
8. "She Believes in Me" (Steve Gibb) [4:19]
  - (from the 1978 album The Gambler)
9. "Always" (Irving Berlin) [2:37]
  - (written in 1925, previously used in the 1942 film The Pride of the Yankees)
  - (covered by many artists including Frank Sinatra and Patsy Cline)
10. "When I Fall in Love" (Edward Heyman, Victor Young) [3:25]
  - (previously recorded by Doris Day in the 1952 film One Minute to Zero)
11. "Crazy" (Willie Nelson) [3:17]
  - (previously recorded by Patsy Cline in 1961)
12. "When a Man Loves a Woman" (Sam M. Lewis, Andrew Wright) [3:51]
  - (previously recorded by Percy Sledge on the 1966 album When a Man Loves a Woman)
13. "You Decorated My Life" (Debbie Hupp, Bob Morrison) [3:45]
  - (from the 1979 album Kenny)
14. "I Can't Help Falling in Love" (Luigi Creatore, Hugo Peretti, George David Weiss) [3:18]
  - (previously recorded by Elvis Presley on the 1961 soundtrack Blue Hawaii)
15. "The Wind Beneath My Wings" (Larry Henley, Jeff Silbar) [3:36]
  - (previously recorded by Bette Midler on the 1988 soundtrack Beaches)

=== Disc 2 ===
1. "It Had to Be You" (Isham Jones, Gus Kahn) [2:39]
  - (originally performed by Sam Lanin and his Orchestra in 1924)
  - (has also appeared in numerous movies including the 1939 movie The Roaring Twenties - sung by Priscilla Lane)
2. "I Swear" (Gary Baker, Frank J. Myers) [3:49]
  - (previously recorded by John Michael Montgomery on the 1994 album Kickin' It Up)
3. "Stardust" (Hoagy Carmichael, Mitchell Parish) [3:43]
  - (previously recorded by Carmichael in 1927)
  - (made popular by Isham Jones in 1930)
4. "I Will Always Love You" (Dolly Parton) [2:59]
  - (originally released by Dolly Parton on the 1974 album Jolene)
  - (also covered by Whitney Houston on the 1992 soundtrack The Bodyguard)
5. "You Send Me" (Sam Cooke) [3:10]
  - (originally sung by Sam Cooke from the 1957 album Sam Cooke)
6. "Through the Years" (Steve Dorff, Marty Panzer) [3:42]
  - (from the 1981 album Share Your Love)
7. "Unchained Melody" (Alex North, Hy Zaret) [3:28]
  - (previously recorded by The Righteous Brothers from the 1965 album Just Once in My Life)
8. "Lady" (Lionel Richie) [3:54]
  - (from the 1980 album 1980 Greatest Hits)
9. "Always and Forever" (Rod Temperton) [4:48]
  - (previously recorded by Heatwave from the 1976 album Too Hot to Handle)
10. "My Funny Valentine" (Lorenz Hart, Richard Rodgers) [4:07]
  - (from the 1994 album Timepiece)
11. "Somewhere My Love" (Maurice Jarre, Paul Francis Webster) [2:44]
  - (previously recorded by Ray Conniff from the 1966 album Somewhere My Love)
12. "You Are So Beautiful" (Bruce Fisher, Billy Preston) [3:09]
  - (from the album We've Got Tonight)
13. "You Light Up My Life" (Joe Brooks) [3:09]
  - (previously recorded by Debby Boone from the 1977 album You Light Up My Life)
  - (also used for the film of the same name)
14. "Love Is a Many Splendored Thing" (Sammy Fain, Paul Francis Webster) [2:40]
  - (previously recorded by The Four Aces in 1955)
15. "Love Me Tender" (Vera Matson, Elvis Presley) [3:04]
  - (previously recorded by Presley from the 1956 album Elvis)

== Production ==
- Bergen White – producer, arrangements
- Jim McKell – producer, recording, mixing, mastering
- Kevin Ryan – assistant engineer
- Nick Sayler – assistant engineer
- Paul Skaife – assistant engineer
- Mark Lambert – additional engineer
- Mills Logan – additional engineer
- Frank Green – mastering
- Digital Editing & Mastering (Nashville, Tennessee) – mastering location
- Jan Greenfield – production coordinator

== Personnel ==
Musicians and Vocalists

Tracks 1–7, 9, 11, 12, 14–20, 22, 24, 26 & 28–30

- Kenny Rogers – lead vocals
- David Briggs – acoustic piano
- Shane Keister – acoustic piano, electric piano, Hammond B3 organ, synthesizers
- Pat Bergeson – electric guitars, harmonica
- John Willis – acoustic guitars, electric guitars
- Bob Burns – acoustic bass, electric bass
- Paul Leim – drums, percussion
- Farrell Morris – percussion, timpani, vibraphone
- Jim Horn – saxophones, flutes
- Bobby Taylor – oboe, English horn
- George Tidwell – trumpet, flugelhorn
- Tom McAninch – French horn
- The Nashville String Machine – strings
- Bergen White – string conductor, backing vocals
- Carl Gorodetzky – concertmaster
- Jana King – backing vocals
- Lisa Silver – backing vocals

The Kenny Rogers Band

Tracks 8, 10, 13, 21, 23, 25 & 27

- Kenny Rogers – vocals
- Steve Glassmeyer – acoustic piano
- Gene Golden – synthesizers
- Warren Hartman – synthesizers, string arrangements (10)
- Randy Dorman – acoustic guitars, electric guitar solos
- Rick Harper – electric guitars
- Bob Burns – bass guitar
- Lynn Hammann – drums
