= If That Ain't Country (song) =

Single by Anthony Smith

from the album If That Ain't Country
- B-side: "What Brothers Do"
- Released: April 27, 2002
- Genre: Country
- Length: 3:52
- Label: Mercury
- Songwriter(s): Anthony Smith, Jeffrey Steele
- Producer(s): Bobby Terry

Anthony Smith singles chronology
"If That Ain't Country" (2002)	"John J. Blanchard" (2002)

"If That Ain't Country" is a debut song co-written and recorded by American country music artist Anthony Smith. It was released in April 2002 as the first single and title track from the album If That Ain't Country. The song reached #26 on the Billboard Hot Country Singles & Tracks chart. The song was written by Smith and Jeffrey Steele.

== Chart performance ==
Chart (2002)	Peak position
US Hot Country Songs (Billboard)	26
