= Muddy Water (Trace Adkins song) =

Single by Trace Adkins

from the album X
- Released: August 4, 2008
- Genre: Country gospel
- Length: 3:55
- Label: Capitol Nashville
- Songwriters: Monty Criswell; Rick Huckaby
- Producer: Frank Rogers

Trace Adkins singles chronology
"You're Gonna Miss This" (2008)	"Muddy Water" (2008)	"Marry for Money" (2009)

"Muddy Water" is a song recorded by American country music artist Trace Adkins. It was released in August 2008 as the first single from his eighth studio album, X. The song was written by Monty Criswell and Rick Huckaby.

== Background ==
Adkins said of the song, "That has haunted me -- because it just spoke to me. I related to it. That's the way my life is."

== Critical reception ==
Leeann Ward of Country Universe gave the song a 'B' grade, writing that Adkins "sings this song of redemption with power, but does not cross the line of vocal theatrics" and "the production accurately presents the swanky southern rock sound that one might imagine from a song with its title."

== Music video ==
The music video was directed by Trey Fanjoy and premiered in October 2008. Stephen Baldwin stars in the video. The church where the video was filmed, the Bethlehem United Methodist Church in Clarksville, Tennessee, was destroyed by a fire in July 2009.

== Chart performance ==
"Muddy Water" debuted at number 45 on the U.S. Billboard Hot Country Songs chart for the week of August 23, 2008.

Chart (2008)	Peak position
US Hot Country Songs (Billboard)	22
US Billboard Bubbling Under Hot 100	9
