= The Real West =

- Genre: Documentary
- Presented by: Kenny Rogers
- Country of origin: United States

Original release
- Network: A&E
- Release: 1992 – 1994
- Network: History Channel
- Release: 1995 – 2004

The Real West is an American historical documentary television series hosted by Kenny Rogers which first aired on A&E from 1992 to 1995. One of A&E's highest-rated series, it prompted parent company A+E Networks to create the History Channel to show reruns of The Real West and other new original programming, primarily documentaries.
