= I Got My Game On =

Single by Trace Adkins

from the album American Man: Greatest Hits Volume II
- Released: August 2007
- Genre: Country
- Length: 3:10
- Label: Capitol Nashville
- Songwriters: Jim Collins, George Teren, Jamey Johnson
- Producer: Frank Rogers

Trace Adkins singles chronology
"I Wanna Feel Something" (2007)	"I Got My Game On" (2007)	"You're Gonna Miss This" (2008)

"I Got My Game On" is a song written by Jim Collins, George Teren and Jamey Johnson, and recorded by American country music singer Trace Adkins. It was released in August 2007 as the first single from his compilation album American Man: Greatest Hits Volume II. The song peaked at No.34 on the Hot Country Songs chart in the United States.

== Popular culture ==
The song was later used as the theme song to Howie Long's Tough Guys show during the FOX Super Bowl XLII pre-game show.

== Music video ==
The song's music video features Adkins and Rodney Carrington. It premiered in 2007 and was directed by Michael Salomon. Adkins won "Best Male Video" at the 2008 CMT Music Awards.

== Chart performance ==
Chart (2007)	Peak position
US Hot Country Songs (Billboard)	34
