= Nowhere to Hide =

Nowhere to Hide may refer to:

In film:

- Nowhere to Hide (1977 film), a television film starring Lee Van Cleef and Tony Musante
- Nowhere to Hide (1987 film), a film starring Amy Madigan and Daniel Hugh Kelly
- Nowhere to Hide (1991 film), a documentary film produced by Jon Alpert together with Ramsey Clark
- Nowhere to Hide (1994 film), a TV movie starring Rosanna Arquette and Scott Bakula
- Nowhere to Hide (1999 film), a South Korean film directed by Lee Myung-se
- Nowhere to Hide (2009 film), a film starring Meredith Monroe and Brian Dietzen
- Nowhere to Hide (2016 film), a documentary film directed by Zaradasht Ahmed

In television episodes:

- "Nowhere to Hide" (All Saints)
- "Nowhere to Hide" (Australia's Next Top Model)
- "Nowhere to Hide" (Dark Justice)
- "Nowhere to Hide" (McLeod's Daughters)
- "Nowhere to Hide" (My Secret Identity)

In music:

- Nowhere to Hide (album), and album by The Virus
- "Nowhere to Hide", a Trampled by Turtles song from the album Blue Sky and the Devil
- "Nowhere to Hide", a song by Antiloop from their 1997 LP
- "Nowhere to Hide" (Crobot song)

== See also ==
- Kyle XY: Nowhere to Hide, an original novel based on the ABC Family series
- No Place to Hide (disambiguation)
