= All I Ask For Anymore =

Single by Trace Adkins

from the album X
- Released: May 18, 2009
- Genre: Country
- Length: 3:57
- Label: Capitol Nashville
- Songwriter(s): Casey Beathard; Tim James
- Producer(s): Frank Rogers

Trace Adkins singles chronology
| "Marry for Money" (2009) | "All I Ask For Anymore" (2009) | "Hillbilly Bone" (2009) |

"All I Ask For Anymore" is a song written by Casey Beathard and Tim James, and recorded by American country music singer Trace Adkins. It was released in May 2009 as the third and final single from his album X. The song overlapped with the chart run of Blake Shelton's "Hillbilly Bone", on which Adkins is also credited.

== Content ==
The song is a mid-tempo in which the narrator tells of how he used to pray to God and ask for material items, but now wishes only for his family's safety.

== Critical reception ==
Thom Jurek of Allmusic said that the song" "arrives with strings, an acoustic guitar, and a pedal steel whispering in that big gritty baritone of Adkins. It's a ballad drenched in personal truth, and gratitude that is profound." Adkins' performance earned him his second consecutive nomination for Best Male Country Vocal Performance at the 52nd Annual Grammy Awards.

== Chart performance ==
On the week ending December 12, 2009, "All I Ask For Anymore" debuted on the Billboard Hot 100 at number 99. It peaked at number 95. In September 2009, it peaked at number 14 on the country chart, as did his previous single, "Marry For Money."

Chart performance for "All I Ask For Anymore"
| Chart (2009) | Peak position |
|---|---|
| US Hot Country Songs (Billboard) | 14 |
| US Billboard Hot 100 | 95 |
