= Love Lifted Me (album) =

Studio album by Kenny Rogers
- Released: 1976
- Recorded: 1975
- Studios: Jack Clement Recording (Nashville, Tennessee)
- Length: 33:18
- Label: United Artists
- Producer: Larry Butler

Kenny Rogers chronology
Love Lifted Me (1976)	Kenny Rogers (1976)

Singles from Kenny Rogers
- 1. "Love Lifted Me" Released: 1975; 2. "While The Feeling's Good" Released: 1976

Love Lifted Me is the first solo studio album by Kenny Rogers for United Artists Records, released in 1976. This is Rogers's first solo effort following the break-up of The First Edition earlier that year.

The album was a minor success, reaching #28 on the Country charts. Two singles were released from the album including the title track, a 1912 gospel hymn (released as a single in 1975), which hit #19 on the U.S. Country charts and crossed to the U.S. Hot 100 by ranking #97. The second single, "While The Feeling's Good" hit #46 on the U.S. Country charts.

== Track listing ==
No.	Title	Writer(s)	Length
1.	"Love Lifted Me"	James Rowe, Howard E. Smith, arranged and adapted by Kenny Rogers	3:48
2.	"Abraham, Martin & John"/"Precious Memories" (medley)	Dick Holler	4:17
3.	"I Would Like to See You Again"	Charlie Craig, Larry Atwood	3:08
4.	"Runaway Girl" (From the United Artists Motion Picture Trackdown)	George Richey, Larry Butler	2:48
5.	"The World Needs a Melody"	Johnny Slate, Larry Henley, Red Lane	3:30
6.	"You Gotta Be Tired"	Ed Bruce, Butler	2:55
7.	"Home-Made Love"	Richard Mainegra	2:29
8.	"While The Feeling's Good"	Roger Bowling, Freddie Hart	4:03
9.	"Heavenly Sunshine"	Richey, Glenn Sutton	2:45
10.	"There's an Old Man in Our Town"	Rogers	3:35

== Personnel ==
- Kenny Rogers – lead vocals
- George Richey, Hargus "Pig" Robbins – piano
- Billy Sanford, Dale Sellers, Fred Carter Jr., Jack Eubanks, Jerry Shook, Jimmy Capps, Jimmy Colvard, Kelso Herston, Pete Wade – guitars
- Pete Drake – steel guitar
- Tommy Allsup – six-string bass guitar
- Bob Moore – upright bass
- Buddy Harman, Jerry Carrigan, Kenny Malone – drums
- Bill Justis – string arrangements
- Carol Montgomery, The Jordanaires – backing vocals

=== Production ===
- Producer – Larry Butler
- Engineers – Billy Sherrill (tracks 1, 2 & 5–10); Rick Horton (track 4).
- Album Design – Leonard Spencer
- Front Cover Photograph – Reid Miles
- Back Cover Photograph – John Brandon

== Charts ==
Chart (1976)	Peak position
US Top Country Albums (Billboard)	28
