= You Can't Make Old Friends (album) =

Studio album by Kenny Rogers
- Released: October 8, 2013
- Studio: Ocean Way Nashville, Sound Stage Studios, Starstruck Studios, Blackbird Studio, The Compound and RTBGV (Nashville, Tennessee); Dockside Studio (Maurice, Louisiana); Doppler Studios (Atlanta, Georgia)
- Genre: Country
- Length: 44:42
- Label: Warner Bros. Nashville
- Producer: Dann Huff; Kyle Lehning; Warren Hartman

Kenny Rogers chronology
Amazing Grace (2012)	You Can't Make Old Friends (2013)	Once Again It's Christmas (2015)

Singles from You Can't Make Old Friends
- 1. "You Can't Make Old Friends" Released: November 4, 2013

Professional ratings
Review scores
Source	Rating
AllMusic	3/5 stars

You Can't Make Old Friends is the twenty-seventh studio album of original music from American country music singer Kenny Rogers. Released on October 8, 2013, via Warner Bros. Nashville, it is Rogers's first album of original material since 2006's Water & Bridges. Its title track, a duet with Dolly Parton, peaked at number 57 on the Billboard Country Airplay chart in December 2013, becoming Rogers' first single released in four years. "You Can't Make Old Friends" was later included on Parton's 2014 album, Blue Smoke.

== Track listing ==
No.	Title	Writer(s)	Length
1.	"You Can't Make Old Friends" (duet with Dolly Parton)	Ryan Hanna King, Don Schlitz, Caitlyn Smith	4:02
2.	"All I Need Is One"	Marc Beeson, Allen Shamblin	3:31
3.	"You Had to Be There"	Casey Beathard, Kenneth Wright	4:00
4.	"'Merica"	Ben Caver, Corey Crowder, Nicole Witt	3:44
5.	"Turn This World Around"	Andrew Dorff, Eric Paslay, Jason Reeves	4:32
6.	"Dreams of the San Joaquin"	Jack Wesley Routh, Randy Sharp	6:06
7.	"Don't Leave Me in the Night Time" (featuring Buckwheat Zydeco)	Paul Overstreet, Schlitz	2:51
8.	"Look At You"	Mike Reid, Shamblin	3:57
9.	"Neon Horses"	Dave Loggins, Ronnie Samoset	4:31
10.	"When You Love Someone"	Bryan Adams, Michael Kamen, Gretchen Peters	3:41
11.	"It's Gonna Be Easy Now"	Dan Seals	3:47

== Personnel ==
- Kenny Rogers – vocals
- Charlie Judge – acoustic piano (1), synthesizers (1), strings (1, 10), keyboards (2, 3, 10)
- Clayton Ivey – electric piano (3), Hammond B3 organ (3, 5, 7, 8)
- Gordon Mote – acoustic piano (3, 10)
- John Barlow Jarvis – acoustic piano (4, 5, 7), Wurlitzer electric piano (5), electric piano (8)
- Warren Hartman – keyboards (5, 6, 8), string arrangements (6), backing vocals (6), percussion (11)
- Tony Harrell – keyboards (6)
- Jeff Taylor – accordion (6)
- Buckwheat Zydeco – accordion (7)
- John Hobbs – keyboards (9, 11)
- J. T. Corenflos – electric guitar (1–3, 10)
- Dann Huff – electric guitar (1–3, 10)
- Ilya Toshinsky – acoustic guitar (1–3, 9–11)
- Pat Buchanan – electric guitar (4, 5, 7–9, 11)
- Brent Mason – electric guitar (4, 5, 7, 8)
- John Willis – acoustic guitar (4, 5, 7), electric guitar (6)
- Bryan Sutton – acoustic guitar (6, 7), mandolin (6, 11), banjo (11)
- Paul Franklin – steel guitar (1, 10)
- Dan Dugmore – steel guitar (2, 3)
- Russ Pahl – steel guitar (4, 8, 9)
- Jimmie Lee Sloas – bass (1–3, 10)
- Michael Rhodes – bass (4, 5, 7, 8)
- Viktor Krauss – bass (6)
- Mike Brignardello – bass (9, 11)
- Greg Morrow – drums (1–5, 9–11)
- Steve Brewster – drums (6–8)
- Eric Darken – percussion
- Larry Hall – strings (6), string arrangements (6)
- Jim Horn – tenor saxophone (7), baritone saxophone (7), horn arrangements (7)
- Dolly Parton – vocals (1)
- Russell Terrell – backing vocals (2, 3)
- Perry Coleman – backing vocals (4, 5, 7–9)
- Vicki Hampton – backing vocals (4–6, 9)
- Tania Hancheroff – backing vocals (4–6, 9)
- Cindy Walker Richardson – backing vocals (4–6, 9)
- Eric Paslay – backing vocals (5)
- Bob Bailey – backing vocals (6, 11)
- Jason Eskridge – backing vocals (6, 11)
- Steve Glassmeyer – backing vocals (6)
- Jordan Lehning – backing vocals (6)
- Michael Mishaw – backing vocals (6, 11)
- Gene Sisk – backing vocals (6)
- Will Robinson – Spanish language (6)
- Troy Johnson – backing vocals (7)
- Wes Hightower – backing vocals (11)

== Production ==
- Jason Henke – A&R direction, management
- Cris Lacy – A&R direction
- Rebekah Sterk – A&R direction
- Dann Huff – producer (1–3, 10)
- Warren Hartman – producer (4–9, 11), basic track arrangements (4–9, 11)
- Kyle Lehning – producer (4–9, 11)
- Mike "Frog" Griffith – production coordinator (1–3, 10)
- Katherine Petillo – art direction
- Sally Carnes Gulde – design
- Shane Tarleton – creative director
- Piper Ferguson – photography
- Thomas Petillo – photography
- Greg Oswald at WME Entertainment – booking
- Bob Burwell – management
- Ken Levitan – management
- Vector Management – management company
- Kevin Dalton and Dwight Wiles at Smith Wiles & Co. – business management

Technical

- Eric Boulanger – mastering
- Doug Sax – mastering
- The Mastering Lab (Ojai, California) – mastering location
- Steve Marcantonio – engineer, vocal recording for Kenny Rogers, mixing (1–3, 10)
- Todd Tidwell – engineer (1–3, 10)
- Kyle Lehning – mixing (4–9, 11)
- Jordan Lehning – vocal recording for Kenny Rogers (4–9, 11), additional overdub engineer and editing (4–9, 11)
- Tony Daigle – accordion overdub engineer (7)
- Russell Terrell – additional engineer (1–3, 10)
- Ryan Carr – additional overdub engineer and editing (4–9, 11)
- Kevin Sokolnicki – additional overdub engineer and editing (4–9, 11)
- Shawn Daugherty – assistant engineer (1–3, 10)
- Mike Lancaster – assistant engineer (1–3, 10)
- Seth Morton – assistant engineer (1–3, 10)
- Justin Francis – assistant engineer (4–9, 11)
- Mike Spezia – assistant engineer (4–9, 11)
- Sean Neff – digital editing (1–3, 10)

== Chart performance ==
=== Album ===
Chart (2013)	Peak position
US Billboard 200	43
US Top Country Albums (Billboard)	9

=== Singles ===
Year	Single	Peak positions
Year	Single	US Country Airplay
2013	"You Can't Make Old Friends"	57
