= Marry for Money =

Single by Trace Adkins

from the album X
- Released: January 12, 2009
- Genre: Country
- Length: 3:04
- Label: Capitol Nashville
- Songwriters: Jimmy Melton; Dave Turnbull
- Producer: Frank Rogers

Trace Adkins singles chronology
"Muddy Water" (2008)	"Marry for Money" (2009)	"All I Ask For Anymore" (2009)

"Marry for Money" is a song written by Jimmy Melton and Dave Turnbull, and recorded by American country music artist Trace Adkins. It was released in January 2009 as the second single from his album X. The song was a Top 20 hit, reaching a peak of number 14 on the U.S. Billboard Hot Country Songs chart in April 2009.

== Content ==
"Marry for Money" begins at a moderate pace with acoustic guitar accompaniment, describing the male narrator's failed attempts at finding love. In the chorus, the tempo increases, with accompaniment from electric guitar and fiddle, and he explains that for his next relationship, he will "marry for money", regardless of his partner's age, physical appearance, or whether she loves him or not.

== Critical reception ==
Deborah Evans Price, of Billboard magazine reviewed the song favorably, calling the song "sheer fun" and saying that Adkins' "tongue-in-cheek performance is full of personality and panache." Karlie Justus of Engine 145 gave the song a thumbs-down review. Although she said "Its solid production and charismatic performance also save it from going from cute to cheesy, unlike some of Adkins’ more ridiculous outings", she still considered it a poor single choice, as she thought that Adkins had too many novelty singles in his repertoire.

== Music video ==
The music video was directed by Michael Salomon, and it aired in April 2009. It featured Deal or No Deal model Patricia Kara as the housekeeper/new wife.

== Chart performance ==
The song debuted at number 49 on the U.S. Billboard Hot Country Songs chart dated January 17, 2009, and reached a peak of number 14 on the chart in April 2009.

Chart (2009)	Peak position
US Hot Country Songs (Billboard)	14
US Billboard Hot 100	98
Canada Hot 100 (Billboard)	84
