= Water & Bridges =

Studio album by Kenny Rogers
- Released: March 21, 2006
- Studio: Blackbird Studio, Emerald Sound Studios and Cartee Day Studios (Nashville, Tennessee); Sound Kitchen (Franklin, Tennessee); Tree Sound Studios and Patchwerk Recording Studio (Atlanta, Georgia); Capitol Studios (Hollywood, California)
- Genre: Country
- Length: 43:20
- Label: Capitol Nashville
- Producer: Dann Huff

Kenny Rogers chronology
21 Number Ones (2006)	Water & Bridges (2006)	The Love of God (2011)

Singles from Water & Bridges
- 1. "I Can't Unlove You" Released: December 12, 2005; 2. "The Last Ten Years (Superman)" Released: October 9, 2006; 3. "Calling Me" Released: February 12, 2007

Professional ratings
Review scores
Source	Rating
AllMusic	3/5 stars

Water & Bridges is the twenty-sixth studio album by American country music singer Kenny Rogers. It was released on March 21, 2006, via Capitol Records Nashville. The album have three singles: "I Can't Unlove You," "The Last Ten Years (Superman)" and "Calling Me," all of which charted on Hot Country Songs and peaked at number 17, 56, and 53 respectively.

"Someone Somewhere Tonight" was later covered by Pam Tillis and Kellie Pickler, the latter of which release the song as a single to country radio in May 2013. "Half a Man" was originally recorded by Anthony Smith on his album If That Ain't Country, and his version charted at number 40 on Hot Country Songs in 2003. The title track was originally recorded by Collin Raye on his 2000 album Tracks, which was also produced by Dann Huff.

== Critical reception ==
Thom Jurek of Allmusic rated the album three stars out of five, saying that it "isn't a perfect record, but it's a sincere one."

== Track listing ==
No.	Title	Writer(s)	Length
1.	"Water & Bridges"	Tim Nichols, Craig Wiseman	4:09
2.	"Someone Is Me"	Josh Kear, Joe Doyle	3:30
3.	"Someone Somewhere Tonight"	Davis Raines, Walt Wilkins	5:18
4.	"I Can't Unlove You"	Wade Kirby, Will Robinson	3:24
5.	"Calling Me" (duet with Don Henley)	Wiseman, Annie Roboff	3:59
6.	"Half a Man"	Anthony Smith	3:18
7.	"I Can Feel You Drifting"	Billy Kirsch, Bat McGrath	3:51
8.	"The Last Ten Years (Superman)"	Tommy Conners, D. Vincent Williams	3:42
9.	"You'll Know Love"	Marc Beeson, Don Pfrimmer, Mike Reid	4:13
10.	"My Petition"	Ashley Gorley, Wade Kirby, Bryan Simpson	4:12
11.	"One Life"	Beeson, Tim Johnson	3:44

== Personnel ==
- Kenny Rogers – vocals
- John Barlow Jarvis – acoustic piano (1–6, 8–11)
- Charlie Judge – keyboards (2, 4, 5, 8), synthesizers (7)
- Jim Hoke – accordion (5)
- Warren Hartman – synthesizers (7)
- Gordon Mote – acoustic piano (7)
- Dann Huff – electric guitar
- Tom Bukovac – electric guitar (1, 3, 5, 6, 8–11)
- Bryan Sutton – acoustic guitar (1, 3, 5, 6, 9–11)
- Kenny Greenberg – electric guitar (2, 7)
- Biff Watson – acoustic guitar (2, 4, 7, 8)
- Jonathan Yudkin – mandolin (2), bouzouki (4), fiddle (4, 8), cello (7), viola (7), violin (7), string arrangements and composing (7)
- Russ Pahl – steel guitar (1–10)
- Bruce Bouton – dobro (8), steel guitar (11)
- Michael Rhodes – bass (1, 3, 5, 6, 9–11)
- Mike Brignardello – bass (2, 4, 7, 8)
- Matt Chamberlain – drums (1, 3, 5, 6, 9–11)
- Shannon Forrest – drums (2, 4, 7, 8)
- Eric Darken – percussion (1, 3, 5, 6, 9–11)
- Perry Coleman – backing vocals (1, 2, 4–8, 10, 11)
- Russell Terrell – backing vocals (2, 4, 6, 8, 10)
- Sarah Buxton – backing vocals (3)
- Don Henley – vocals (5)
- Vince Gill – backing vocals (9)

String section (Tracks 1 & 11)

- Paul Buckmaster – string arrangements and conductor
- Paula Hochhalter, Suzie Katayama, Daniel Smith and Rudy Stein – cello
- Karen Elaine Bakunin, Matt Funes, Vicki Miskolczy and Carole Mukogawa – viola
- Darius Campo, Susan Chatman, Bruce Dukov, Ronald Folsom, Larry Greenfield, Alan Grunfeld, Natalie Leggett, Robert Peterson, Haim Shtrum, Tereza Stanislav, Josefina Vergara and Miwako Watanabe – violin

== Production ==
- Dann Huff – producer
- Jeff Balding – recording
- Jed Hackett – recording
- Mark Hagen – recording, vocal recording for Don Henley
- Justin Niebank – recording, mixing
- Steve Churchyard – string recording (1, 11)
- Drew Bollman – recording assistant, mix assistant
- Steve Crowder – recording assistant
- Travis Daniels – recording assistant
- Allen Ditto – recording assistant
- Greg Lawrence – recording assistant
- David Robinson – recording assistant
- Aaron Walk – string recording assistant (1, 11)
- Melissa Mattey – mix assistant
- Chris Rowe – digital editing
- Andy Ackland – Pro Tools engineer
- Adam Ayan – mastering at Gateway Mastering (Portland, Maine)
- Darrell Griffith – A&R coordinator
- Mike "Frog" Griffith – production coordinator
- Joanna Carter – art direction
- Joe Rogers – design
- Denise Arguijo – art production
- Michelle Hall – art production
- Colourworks – digital imaging
- Melanie Dunea – photography

== Charts ==
=== Weekly charts ===
Chart (2006)	Peak position
US Billboard 200	14
US Top Country Albums (Billboard)	5

=== Year-end charts ===
Chart (2006)	Position
US Top Country Albums (Billboard)	53
