= You're Gonna Miss This =

Single by Trace Adkins

from the album American Man: Greatest Hits Volume II
- Released: January 14, 2008
- Genre: Country
- Length: 3:44
- Label: Capitol Nashville
- Songwriters: Ashley Gorley, Lee Thomas Miller
- Producer: Frank Rogers

Trace Adkins singles chronology
"I Got My Game On" (2007)	"You're Gonna Miss This" (2008)	"Muddy Water" (2008)

"You're Gonna Miss This" is a song written by Ashley Gorley and Lee Thomas Miller and recorded by American country music artist Trace Adkins. It was released in January 2008 as the second and final single from Adkins' compilation album American Man: Greatest Hits Volume II. Adkins's fastest-climbing single to date, it is his third number one hit on the US Billboard Hot Country Songs charts. It also peaked at number 12 on the Billboard Hot 100 and at number 19 on the Pop 100 charts.

== Content ==
"You're Gonna Miss This" is a ballad composed of three verses and a bridge, each section portraying an event in the life of an unnamed female character: being driven to school by her mother in the first verse, being visited at her apartment by her father in the second verse, and conversing with a plumber while her children are misbehaving and making noise in the third verse. In all three of the situations, the song's other characters (the parents and the plumber) assure the central character that even though she may not immediately realize it, she will miss the important moments of her life.

Ashley Gorley, one of the song's writers, came up with the central idea for "You're Gonna Miss This" one day while a repairman was working on his house. His two children (ages two and four at the time; he has since had a third) were running around the house and stealing the repairman's tools; after Gorley apologized, the repairman replied, "Don't worry about it — I've got two babies, too." Gorley, after determining that the incident with the repairman might work as a song idea, recalled it to Lee Thomas Miller, who then suggested the title "You're Gonna Miss This." The two then worked backward from the bridge, changing the song's scenario several times until they finally settled on having the song focus on a female central character.

Adkins then decided to record it after hearing it. Being the father of five daughters, its message resonated with him. Upon hearing Adkins's recording of the song, Gorley felt that Adkins had "made it something more than it was".

== Music video ==
The song's music video was filmed in Adkins's hometown of Sarepta, Louisiana with additional scenes are from Plain Dealing, Louisiana. It contains a variety of Americana scenes framed around the singer traveling about in a pickup truck. The video was directed by Peter Zavadil.

== Chart performance ==
Chart (2008)	Peak position
US Hot Country Songs (Billboard)	1
US Billboard Hot 100	12
US Billboard Pop 100	19
Canada Hot 100 (Billboard)	11

=== Year-end charts ===
Chart (2008)	Position
US Hot 100 (Billboard)	93
US Country Songs (Billboard)	7
Canada Country (Billboard)	3

== Certifications ==
Region	Certification	Certified units/sales
United States (RIAA)	2× Platinum	2,000,000^{‡}
^{‡} Sales+streaming figures based on certification alone.
