= You Can't Make Old Friends =

Single by Kenny Rogers duet with Dolly Parton

from the album You Can't Make Old Friends
- Released: November 4, 2013
- Recorded: 2013
- Studio: Starstruck Studios (Nashville)
- Genre: Country
- Length: 4:02
- Label: Warner Music Nashville
- Songwriters: Ryan Hanna King; Don Schlitz; Caitlyn Smith
- Producer: Dann Huff

Kenny Rogers singles chronology
"When You Tell Me You Love Me" (2009)	"You Can't Make Old Friends" (2013)

Dolly Parton singles chronology
"From Here to the Moon and Back" (2013)	"You Can't Make Old Friends" (2013)	"Blue Smoke" (2013)

"You Can't Make Old Friends" is a song by Kenny Rogers in duet with Dolly Parton from Roger's 2013 album of the same name. It was written by Ryan Hanna King, Don Schlitz, Caitlyn Smith. The song was released as a digital download on September 3, 2013. Its music video premiered on ABC's Good Morning America on September 16. The song was subsequently sent to country radio on November 4. It debuted on the Billboard Country Airplay chart in December 2013, eventually peaking at number 57.

For their performance, Kenny Rogers and Dolly Parton were nominated in 2014 at the 56th Annual Grammy Awards for Grammy Award for Best Country Duo/Group Performance.

"You Can't Make Old Friends" was later included on Parton's 2014 album, Blue Smoke.

== Personnel ==
- Dolly Parton – guest vocals
- J. T. Corenflos – electric guitar
- Eric Darken – percussion
- Paul Franklin – steel guitar
- Dann Huff – electric guitar
- Ilya Toshinsky – acoustic guitar
- Charlie Judge – acoustic piano
- Greg Morrow – drums
- Jimmie Lee Sloas – bass

== Production ==
- Producer – Dann Huff
- Engineer – Todd Tidwell
- Additional Engineer – Russell Terrell
- Assistant Engineers – Shawn Daugherty, Mike Lancaster and Seth Morton.
- Recorded at Starstruck Studios (Nashville, TN).
- Additional Engineering at RTBGV (Nashville, TN).
- Kenny Rogers' vocals recorded by Steve Marcantonio at Starstruck Studios, Blackbird Studio (Nashville, TN) and Doppler Studios (Atlanta, GA).
- Mixed by Steve Marcantonio at Blackbird Studio
- Digital Editing by Sean Neff

== Charts ==
Year	Single	Peak positions
Year	Single	US Country Airplay
2013	"You Can't Make Old Friends"	57

== Cover versions ==
A cover version of "You Can't Make Old Friends", a duet between Nathan Carter and Lisa McHugh, appeared on McHugh's 2015 album Wildfire.

The Petersens released a Bluegrass version on May 20, 2020, on their Youtube Channel as a tribute to then recently deceased Kenny Rogers.
