= Winfield's Locket =

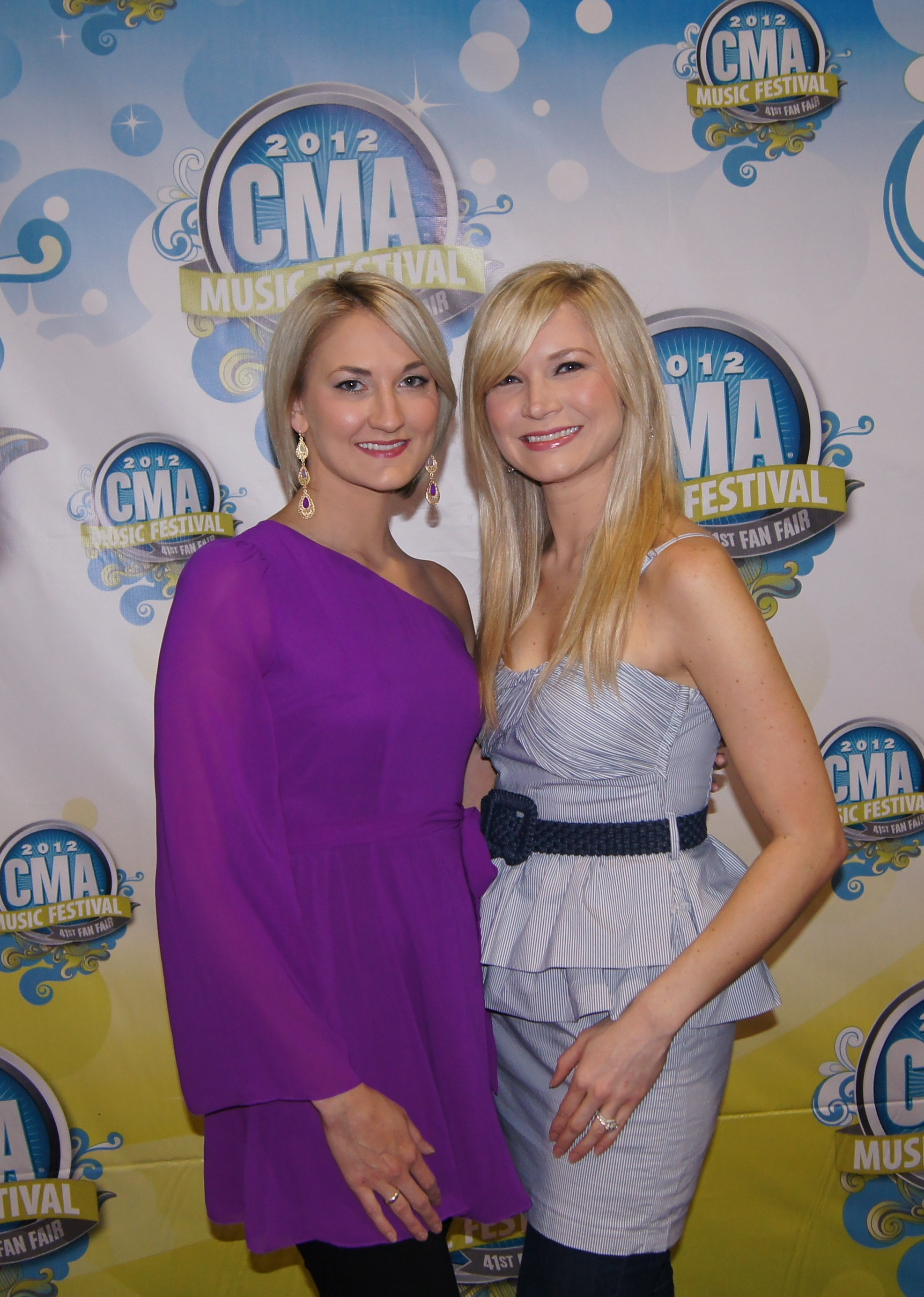
- Winfield's Locket arriving on the CMA Music Festival Red Carpet in June 2012 (L-R: Brooke Martin, Leslie Martin)

Background information
- Origin: Nashville, Tennessee, United States
- Genres: Country, country pop, Gospel
- Years active: 2008–Present
- Label: This Side Up Records - Independent
- Members: Brooke Martin, Leslie Martin
- Website: www.winfieldslocket.com

Winfield's Locket is an American country pop duo from Denham Springs, Louisiana. The duo is composed of sisters, Brooke Martin (lead and background vocals and guitar) and Leslie Martin (lead and background vocals and piano).

== Musical career ==
Born and raised in Louisiana less than 100 miles from the French Quarter in New Orleans, Brooke and Leslie Martin sang Gospel songs and hymns in church. The sisters moved to Nashville in 2008 and began working with, Tim Johnson.

In 2010, the sisters released their self-titled debut album, Winfield's Locket. They co-produced the album with Ilya Toshinskiy (formerly of Bering Strait) and co-writer Jason Henke. The album featured 12 songs co-written by the Martins. The album generated favorable reviews.

In 2011, Winfield's Locket appeared as a featured guest artist on Kenny Rogers’ record, The Love Of God, which debuted at #2 on the Billboard Top Christian Albums chart, #8 on the Billboard Top Country Albums chart, and #31 on the Billboard Top 200 following its release on March 7, 2011. The sisters sang with Rogers on "In The Sweet By And By".

Rogers' The Love Of God was re-released in Europe on May 14, 2012, as Faith by Wrasse Records and in the U.S. on October 5, 2012, as Amazing Grace by Gaither Music Group.

In 2011, the sisters also released the single, "Taken Care Of" in honor of their friend, Leslie Lehrman, who had been diagnosed with lung cancer. A video of the song was released and was used by the campaign, "Where's The Funding (For Lung Cancer)?" and was also used for those affected by the Alabama tornado outbreak.

The sisters were also featured in the "Debut Spotlight" section of CMA Close Up magazine (a publication by the Country Music Association).

The Country Music Association invited the sisters to kick off the 2011 CMA Music Festival in Nashville with an acoustic performance of the national anthem to the festival-opening performance. Winfield's Locket also made its full-band performance debut at CMA Music Fest with a set on the Bud Light Stage. In 2012, the duo was a featured artist in the CMA Music Festival Fan Fair Exhibit Hall.

Winfield's Locket performed at the Copper Country Music Festival, held annually on Labor Day Weekend in Copper Mountain, Colorado. Winfield's Locket performed a 10-song set.

In 2012, Winfield's Locket played the Third Annual Bayou Country Superfest in Baton Rouge, Louisiana.

== Discography ==
2010 - Winfield's Locket

1. Fast
2. Save Yourself
3. No Place To Hide
4. Is This Ever Gonna End
5. In A Letter
6. How Much I Gave
7. Star-Crossed Lover
8. Hope Is On The Way
9. The Storm
10. Love Him Like You
11. Worth The Drive
12. Sometimes Angels Have To Fly

2011 - "Taken Care Of" (Single)

2011 - The Love Of God (Kenny Rogers) - "In The Sweet By And By" - U.S.

2012 - Amazing Grace (Kenny Rogers) - "In The Sweet By And By" - U.S.

2012 - Faith (Kenny Rogers) - "In The Sweet By And By" - Europe
