= I'm Tryin' =

Single by Trace Adkins

from the album Chrome
- B-side: "Chrome"
- Released: July 2, 2001
- Genre: Country
- Length: 4:45 (album version); 3:40 (radio edit)
- Label: Capitol Nashville
- Songwriters: Jeffrey Steele; Anthony Smith; Chris Wallin
- Producer: Dann Huff

Trace Adkins singles chronology
"I'm Gonna Love You Anyway" (2000)	"I'm Tryin'" (2001)	"Help Me Understand" (2002)

"I'm Tryin'" is a song written by Jeffrey Steele, Chris Wallin, and Anthony Smith and recorded by American country music artist Trace Adkins. It released in July 2001 as the lead-off single from his album Chrome. It peaked at number 6 on the Billboard Hot Country Songs charts.

== Content ==
"I'm Tryin'" is a mid-tempo narrated by a man who has been divorced for two years and is facing troubles in his life, such as working double shifts just to make enough money to pay alimony to his ex-wife. In the chorus, the man expresses his struggles.

The song is composed in the key of A flat major. Jeffrey Steele, Anthony Smith, and Chris Wallin composed the song during a writing session in which they also wrote "3 Seconds" for Sammy Kershaw and Lorrie Morgan. Steele suggested the central premise of the song, and then the other two added lines until they felt the song was completed. Steele told the blog The Boot in 2020 that he came up with the opening line "This gettin' up early, pullin' double shifts / Gonna make an old man of me long before I ever get rich", while Wallin suggested the next line in which the narrator is revealed to be recently divorced. Steele also described the song as "very Beatles-ish".

== Music video ==
The music video was directed by Steven Goldmann, and was filmed in Toronto.

== Personnel ==
Compiled from liner notes.

- Mike Brignardello — bass guitar
- Eric Darken — percussion
- Paul Franklin — steel guitar
- Dann Huff — electric guitar
- B. James Lowry — acoustic guitar
- Brent Mason — electric guitar
- Steve Nathan — keyboards
- Russell Terrell — background vocals
- Lonnie Wilson — drums
- Jonathan Yudkin — violin, cello, mandocello

== Chart positions ==
"I'm Tryin'" debuted at number 58 on the U.S. Billboard Hot Country Singles & Tracks for the week of July 7, 2001.

Chart (2001)	Peak position
US Hot Country Songs (Billboard)	6
US Billboard Hot 100	44

=== Year-end charts ===
Chart (2001)	Position
US Country Songs (Billboard)	53

Chart (2002)	Position
US Country Songs (Billboard)	50
