= I Can't Unlove You =

Single by Kenny Rogers

from the album Water & Bridges
- Released: December 12, 2005
- Genre: Country
- Length: 3:24
- Label: Capitol Nashville
- Songwriters: Wade Kirby; Will Robinson
- Producer: Dann Huff

Kenny Rogers singles chronology
"My World Is Over" (2004)	"I Can't Unlove You" (2005)	"The Last Ten Years (Superman)" (2006)

"I Can't Unlove You" is a song recorded by American country music artist Kenny Rogers. It was released in December 2005 as the first single from his album Water & Bridges. The song was written by Wade Kirby and Will Robinson. In Brazil, the song had a version titled "Eu Não Sei Dizer Que Eu Não Te Amo", performed by the duo Edson & Hudson in Portuguese and by Kenny Rogers in English.

The song debuted at #57 on the U.S. Billboard Hot Country Songs chart for the week of December 10, 2005. It would be his final Top 20 single.

== Critical reception ==
Kevin John Coyne of Country Universe wrote that Rogers "sounds as good as ever on this breakup song that rises above its awkward title." The song also received a favorable review from Deborah Evans Price of Billboard, who said that "Rogers delivers this gorgeous ballad in the warm, straightforward style that has made him a household name."

== Music video ==
The music video was directed by Peter Zavadil and premiered in December 2005.

== Chart performance ==
Chart (2005–2006)	Peak position
US Hot Country Songs (Billboard)	17
US Billboard Hot 100	93
