= Help Me Understand (Trace Adkins song) =

Single by Trace Adkins

from the album Chrome
- Released: March 2, 2002
- Genre: Country
- Length: 3:51
- Label: Capitol Nashville
- Songwriters: Wayne Hector, Steve Mac, Chris Farren
- Producer: Dann Huff

Trace Adkins singles chronology
"I'm Tryin'" (2001)	"Help Me Understand" (2002)	"Chrome" (2002)

"Help Me Understand" is a song written by Wayne Hector, Steve Mac and Chris Farren, and recorded by American country music artist Trace Adkins. It was released in March 2002 as the second single from his album Chrome. The song reached #17 on the Billboard Hot Country Singles & Tracks chart.

== Personnel ==
Compiled from liner notes.

- Trace Adkins — lead vocals
- Tim Akers — keyboards
- Mike Brignardello — bass guitar
- Eric Darken — percussion
- Larry Franklin — fiddle
- Paul Franklin — steel guitar
- John Hobbs — keyboards
- Dann Huff — electric guitar
- Brent Mason — electric guitar
- Chris McHugh — drums
- Russell Terrell — background vocals
- Biff Watson — acoustic guitar

== Chart performance ==
Chart (2002)	Peak position
US Hot Country Songs (Billboard)	17
US Billboard Hot 100	80

=== Year-end charts ===
Chart (2002)	Position
US Country Songs (Billboard)	56
