= Steve Sundholm =

American songwriter

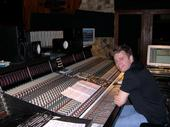

Background information
- Birth name: Steven Sundholm
- Born: June 5, 1974 (age 50); Portland, Oregon, United States
- Genres: Pop, rock, R&B, soul, alternative dance, hip hop
- Occupation(s): Singer, songwriter, arranger, vocal producer, A&R, and record producer
- Instrument: Guitar
- Years active: 2002-present

Steve Sundholm (born June 5, 1974 in Portland, Oregon) is an American record producer, songwriter and audio engineer.

== Early life ==
Sundholm's father (Conrad Sundholm) is the founder of Sunn guitar amps. Sundholm began his musical career in Portland working with Geoff Byrd, David Klinkenberg, Jonah and The Village Green.

== Career ==
In 2006, Sundholm produced the album Shrinking Violets for Byrd. Byrd's radio single "Before Kings" peaked at No. 42 on the Radio & Records Hot AC Chart and led to him touring with Hall & Oates.

Sundholm’s moved to NightBird Studios where, as Chief Engineer, he worked in the studio with Carrie Underwood, Ryan Tedder, John Oates, Jet, John Legend, Lil' Wayne, Enrique Iglesias, Johnny K, Teddy Riley, Nick Jonas, and many other artists, producers and writers.

In October 2006, Sundholm produced "Winter Waltz" and "Hideaway (When It Snows)" on the Jim Brickman release Escape. "Hideaway (When It Snows) peaked at No. 3 on the Billboard Adult Contemporary Chart in December, 2006. He has also been the mastering engineer for many of Brickman's albums and radio singles including "Never Alone" featuring Lady Antebellum (No. 14 Billboard AC Chart, July, 2007) and "Coming Home For Christmas" featuring Richie McDonald of the group Lonestar (No. 4 Billboard AC Chart December, 2007).

Sundholm was largely responsible for developing the sound of the violinist David Klinkenberg. In December 2007, Klinkenberg's album The Carol of Emmanuel peaked at No. 1 on the Family Christian Stores Chart, making it the top-selling record in the Christian music industry that month.

More recently, he has been focusing on songwriting and producing other styles of music. In June 2009, he co-wrote and co-produced "Movin' In" on the Walt Disney Records debut release for Mitchel Musso. Sundholm also co-wrote with producer/writers PJ Bianco (Jonas Brothers) and Eddie Galan (Clique Girls) "Stuck On You" for Musso, which was used as a download-only exclusive for the iTunes Store.

Sundholm has also collaborated with Aaron Carter, Asher Book, and Tiffany Thornton, the bands TV/TV (Mom & Pop/Jive) and School Boy Humor (Vagrant) as well as collaborating with hit songwriters PJ Bianco (Jonas Brothers), Eric Dill (Daughtry), and Eddie Galan (High School Musical). Sundholm also collaborated with Galan and Aaron Carter on his new single, “I Ain’t Gonna Take No More.”

After a seven-year tour in Los Angeles, Sundholm came back to his hometown of Portland. As of 2023, Steve continues his career at the Genius Mixmeister at Kung Fu Bakery Recording Studios.

Sundholm lives in West Linn, Oregon with his wife Michelle and two sons, Everett and Ashton.
