= Chrome (Trace Adkins song) =

Single by Trace Adkins

from the album Chrome
- Released: September 16, 2002
- Recorded: 2001
- Genre: Country; country rap
- Length: 3:22
- Label: Capitol Nashville
- Songwriters: Anthony Smith, Jeffrey Steele
- Producer: Dann Huff

Trace Adkins singles chronology
"Help Me Understand" (2002)	"Chrome" (2002)	"Then They Do" (2003)

"Chrome" is a song written by Anthony Smith and Jeffrey Steele and recorded by American country music artist Trace Adkins. It was released in September 2002 as the third and final single and title track from his 2001 album of the same name. It peaked at number 10 on the United States Billboard Hot Country Singles & Tracks chart.

Before its release as a single, "Chrome" was the B-side to the album's first single, "I'm Tryin'."

== Music video ==
The music video was directed by Michael Salomon.

== Personnel ==
Compiled from liner notes.

- Trace Adkins — lead vocals
- Mike Brignardello — bass guitar
- Larry Franklin — fiddle
- Paul Franklin — steel guitar
- John Hobbs — piano
- Dann Huff — electric guitar
- Brent Mason — electric guitar
- Chris McHugh — drums
- Russell Terrell — background vocals
- Biff Watson — acoustic guitar

== Chart positions ==
"Chrome" debuted at number 49 on the U.S. Billboard Hot Country Songs for the week of September 28, 2002.

Chart (2002–2003)	Peak position
US Hot Country Songs (Billboard)	10
US Billboard Hot 100	74

=== Year-end charts ===
Chart (2003)	Position
US Country Songs (Billboard)	56
