= Kenny Rogers =

American country singer (1938–2020)

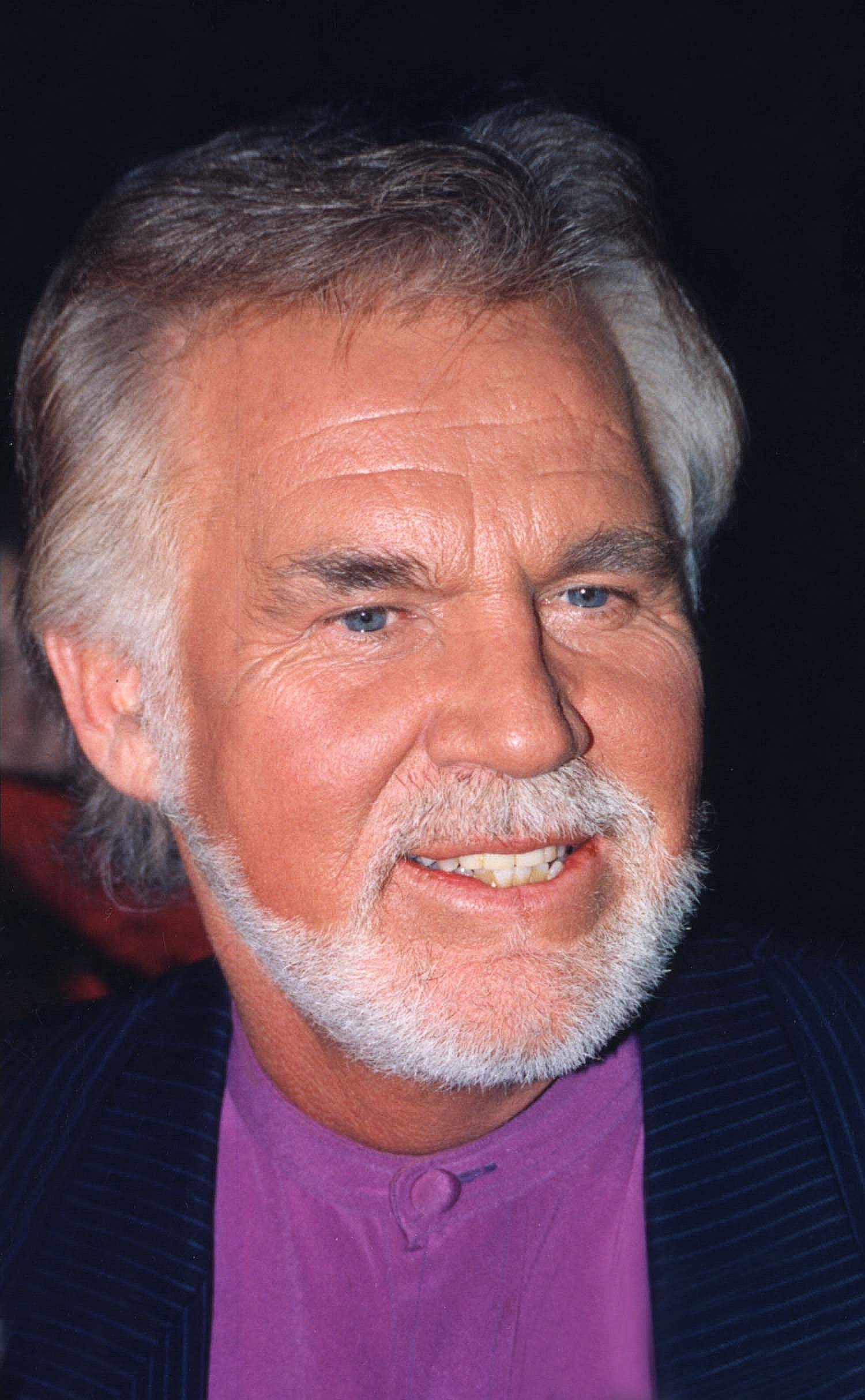
- Rogers in 1997

Background information
- Born: Kenneth Donald Ray Rogers; August 21, 1938; Houston, Texas, U.S.
- Died: March 20, 2020 (aged 81) Sandy Springs, Georgia, U.S.
- Genres: Country; pop; rock; psychedelia; folk; jazz
- Occupations: Singer; songwriter; musician; record producer; actor; entrepreneur
- Instruments: Vocals; guitar; bass guitar
- Works: Kenny Rogers discography
- Years active: 1956–2017
- Labels: Cue; Carlton; Mercury; United Artists; Giant; Reprise; Atlantic; Liberty; Curb; RCA; Dreamcatcher; Capitol; WEA; Warner Bros.
- Formerly of: The New Christy Minstrels; Kenny Rogers and The First Edition
- Spouses: Janice Gordon (m. 1958; div. 1960); Jean Massey (m. 1960; div. 1963); Margo Anderson (m. 1963; div. 1975); Marianne Gordon (m. 1977; div. 1993); Wanda Miller (m. 1997)
- Website: kennyrogers.com

Kenneth Donald Ray Rogers (August 21, 1938 – March 20, 2020) was an American country music singer-songwriter. Rogers was particularly popular with country audiences, but also charted more than 120 hit singles across various genres, topping the country and pop album charts for more than 200 individual weeks in the United States alone. He sold more than 100 million records worldwide during his lifetime, making him one of the best-selling music artists of all time. His fame and career spanned multiple genres—jazz, folk, pop, rock, and country. He remade his career and was one of the most successful cross-over artists of all time. He was inducted into the Country Music Hall of Fame in 2013.

In the late 1950s, Rogers began his recording career with the Houston-based group the Scholars, who first released "The Poor Little Doggie". After some solo releases, including 1958's "That Crazy Feeling", Rogers then joined a group with jazz singer Bobby Doyle. In 1966, he became a member of the folk ensemble the New Christy Minstrels, playing double bass and bass guitar, as well as singing. In 1967, several members of the New Christy Minstrels and he left to found the group the First Edition, with whom he scored his first major hit, "Just Dropped In (To See What Condition My Condition Was In)", a psychedelic rock song, which peaked at number five on the Billboard charts. As Rogers took an increased leadership role in the First Edition following the success of 1969's "Ruby, Don't Take Your Love to Town", the band gradually changed styles to a more country feel. The band broke up in 1975–76, and Rogers embarked on a long and successful solo career, which included several successful collaborations, including duets with singers Dottie West, Dolly Parton, and Sheena Easton, and a songwriting partnership with Lionel Richie. His signature song, 1978's "The Gambler", was a crossover hit that won him a Grammy Award in 1980, and was selected in 2018 for preservation in the National Recording Registry by the Library of Congress. He developed the Gambler persona into a character for a successful series of television films starting with 1980's Emmy-nominated Kenny Rogers as The Gambler.

Rogers's albums The Gambler and Kenny were featured in the About.com poll of "The 200 Most Influential Country Albums Ever". He was voted the "Favorite Singer of All Time" in a 1986 poll by readers of both USA Today and People. He received numerous awards, such as the American Music, Grammy, Academy of Country Music, and Country Music Association awards, as well as a lifetime achievement award for a career spanning six decades in 2003. His later successes included the 2006 album release Water & Bridges, an across-the-board hit that entered the top five in the Billboard Country Albums sales charts, also charting in the top 15 of the Billboard 200. The first single from the album, "I Can't Unlove You", was also a sizable chart hit. Remaining a popular entertainer around the world, he continued to tour regularly until his retirement in 2017.

Rogers had acting roles in movies and television shows, including the title roles in Kenny Rogers as The Gambler, the MacShayne series for The NBC Mystery Movie, and the 1982 feature film Six Pack. He was a co-founder of the restaurant chain Kenny Rogers Roasters in collaboration with former KFC CEO John Y. Brown Jr. Although the stores closed in the United States, they are still a fixture in Asia.

== Early life ==
Kenneth Donald Ray Rogers was born the fourth of eight children on August 21, 1938, at St Joseph's Infirmary in Houston, Texas. His parents were Lucille Lois Rogers, a nurse's assistant, and Edward Floyd Rogers, a carpenter. The family lived in the San Felipe Courts public housing project. Rogers was said to be of Irish and Native American ancestry. Rogers attended Wharton Elementary School, George Washington Junior High School, and graduated from Jefferson Davis High School (now Northside High School) in 1956.

In 1949, Rogers won a talent show at the Texan Theatre. He served as a busboy at the Rice Hotel and swept floors at a hat store for $9 a week. He later attended the University of Houston.

In 1986, on The Phil Donahue Show, Rogers told the audience that he was the first person in his family "as far back as we know" to graduate from high school.

We were broke. We lived in a federal housing project. I think the most money my father ever made was $75 a week. There were times as a child that, I don't think I was ever really hungry – I always had food to eat – but there's no question that our family was nutritionally deprived at times. We'd eat peanut butter sandwiches, 'cause that's all there was. Quite honestly, when you're a kid, you don't know any better, you think that's how everyone eats.

== Career ==
=== Early career ===
In a recording career dating back to the 1950s, Rogers moved from teenager rock and roll through psychedelic rock to become a country-pop crossover artist of the 1970s and 1980s. He had a minor solo hit in 1957 called "That Crazy Feeling". After sales slowed down, Rogers joined a jazz group called the Bobby Doyle Three, who were frequently hired by clubs due to their fan following. The group recorded for Columbia Records. They disbanded in 1965, and a 1966 jazzy rock single Rogers recorded for Mercury Records, called "Here's That Rainy Day", failed. Rogers also worked as a producer, writer, and session musician for other performers, including country artists Mickey Gilley and Eddy Arnold. In 1966, he joined the New Christy Minstrels as a singer and double bass player.

Feeling that the Minstrels were not offering the success they wanted, Rogers and fellow members Mike Settle, Terry Williams, and Thelma Camacho left the group. They formed the First Edition in 1967 (later renamed "Kenny Rogers and the First Edition"). They were later joined by Kin Vassy. They chalked up a string of hits on both the pop and country charts, including "Just Dropped In (To See What Condition My Condition Was In)" (Rogers doing lead vocals and bass), "But You Know I Love You", "Ruby, Don't Take Your Love to Town", "Tell It All, Brother", "Reuben James", and "Something's Burning".

When the First Edition disbanded in 1976, Rogers launched his solo career. He soon developed a more middle-of-the-road sound that sold to both pop and country audiences. He charted more than 60 top-40 hit singles (including two number ones—"Lady" and "Islands in the Stream"). His music has been featured in top-selling movie soundtracks, such as Convoy, Urban Cowboy, and The Big Lebowski.

=== Solo career and duets with other artists ===
As the First Edition was breaking up in 1975, Rogers was the face of a national commercial advertising the "Quick Pickin' Fun Strummin' Home Guitar Course", but in 1976, Rogers signed a solo deal with United Artists. Producer Larry Butler and Rogers began a partnership that would last four years.

Rogers's first outing for his new label was Love Lifted Me. The album charted and two singles, "Love Lifted Me" and "While the Feeling's Good", were minor hits. The song "Runaway Girl" was featured in the film Trackdown (1976). Later in 1976, Rogers issued his second album, the self-titled Kenny Rogers, whose first single, "Laura (What's He Got That I Ain't Got)", was another solo hit.

The single "Lucille" (1977) was a major hit, reaching number one on the pop charts in 12 countries, selling over five million copies, and firmly establishing Rogers's post-First Edition career. On the strength of "Lucille", the album Kenny Rogers reached number one on the Billboard Country Album Chart. More success was to follow, including the multiplatinum-selling album The Gambler and another international number one single, "Coward of the County", taken from the equally successful album, Kenny. In 1980, the Rogers/Butler partnership came to an end, though they occasionally reunited, in 1987 on the album I Prefer the Moonlight and again in 1993 on the album If Only My Heart Had a Voice.

In the late 1970s, Rogers teamed up with close friend Dottie West for a series of albums and duets. Together, the duo won two gold records (one of which later went platinum), two CMA Awards, an ACM nomination, two Grammy nominations, and one Music City News award for their two hit albums Every Time Two Fools Collide (number one) and Classics (number three), selling out stadiums and arenas while on tour for several years, as well as appearing on several network television specials, which showcased them. Their hits together, "Every Time Two Fools Collide" (number one), "Anyone Who Isn't Me Tonight" (number two), "What Are We Doin' in Love" (number one), "All I Ever Need Is You" (number one), and "Till I Can Make It On My Own" (number three), all became country standards. Of West, Rogers stated in a 1995 TNN interview: "She, more than anybody else I ever worked with, sang with such emotion that you actually believed what she sang. A lot of people sing words, Dottie West sang emotions." In a 1978 press release for their album Every Time Two Fools Collide, Rogers credited West with further establishing and cementing his career with country music audiences. In the same release, West credited him with taking her career to new audiences. Rogers was with West only hours before she died at age 58 after sustaining injuries in a 1991 car accident, as discussed in his 2012 biography Luck or Something Like It. In 1995, he starred as himself, alongside Michele Lee as West, in the CBS biographical film Big Dreams and Broken Hearts: The Dottie West Story.

In 1980, a selection he recorded as a duet with Kim Carnes, "Don't Fall in Love with a Dreamer", became a hit. Earlier that year, he sang a duet of "You and Me" with Lynda Carter in her television music special Lynda Carter Special (Rogers originally recorded this with Dottie West for the Every Time Two Fools Collide album). Later in 1980 came his partnership with Lionel Richie, who wrote and produced Rogers's number-one hit "Lady". Richie went on to produce Rogers's 1981 album Share Your Love, a chart topper and commercial favorite featuring hits such as "I Don't Need You" (pop number three), "Through the Years" (pop number 13), and "Share Your Love with Me" (pop number 14). His first Christmas album was also released that same year. Rogers returned the favor by singing backing vocals on Richie's top-five hit "My Love". In 1982, Rogers released the album Love Will Turn You Around. The album's the title track reached number 13 on the Billboard Hot 100 and topped the country and AC charts. It was the theme song of Rogers's 1982 film Six Pack. Shortly afterwards, he started working with producer David Foster in 1983, recording the smash Top 10 hit Bob Seger cover "We've Got Tonight", a duet with Sheena Easton. Also a number-one single on the country charts in the United States, it reached the top 30 on the British charts.

In 1981, Rogers bought the old ABC Dunhill building and built one of the most popular and state-of-the-art recording studios in Los Angeles, which he named Lion Share Studios. The song "We Are the World" was recorded there and at A&M Studios.

Rogers went on to work with Barry Gibb of the Bee Gees, who produced his 1983 hit album Eyes That See in the Dark, featuring the title track and yet another number-one hit "Islands in the Stream", a duet with Dolly Parton. Gibb, along with his brothers, Robin and Maurice, originally wrote the song for Diana Ross in an R&B style, only later to change it for Rogers's album.

"Islands in the Stream", Rogers's duet with Dolly Parton, was the first single to be released from Eyes That See in the Dark in the United States, and it quickly went to number one in the Billboard Hot 100 (it proved to be the last country single to reach number one on that chart until "Amazed" by Lonestar did so in 2000), as well as topping Billboard's country and adult contemporary singles charts; it was certified platinum by the Recording Industry Association of America for shipping two million copies in the United States. Rogers reunited with Parton in 1984 for a holiday album, Once Upon a Christmas, and the TV special Kenny and Dolly: A Christmas to Remember (which resulted in a popular video of "Christmas Without You"), as well as a 1985 duet "Real Love", which also topped the U.S. country singles chart. The two continued to collaborate on occasional projects through subsequent years, including a 2013 duet single "You Can't Make Old Friends".

Despite the success of "Islands in the Stream", however, RCA Records insisted on releasing Eyes' title track as the first UK single, and the song stalled at a disappointing number 61 there, although it did stay in the top 100 for several weeks. (When it was eventually released in the United States, it was more successful, charting high on the adult contemporary chart and making the country top 30). "Islands in the Stream" was issued as a follow-up single in Britain and sold well, making number seven. The album itself reached number one on the country charts on both sides of the Atlantic and enjoyed multimillion unit sales. "Buried Treasure", "This Woman", and "Evening Star"/"Midsummer Nights" were also all successful singles from the album.

Shortly after came the album What About Me?, a hit whose title track—a trio performance with James Ingram and Kim Carnes—was nominated for a Grammy Award; the single "Crazy" (not to be confused with the Willie Nelson-penned Patsy Cline hit), co-written with Richard Marx, topped the country charts. David Foster was to work again with Rogers in his 1985 album The Heart of the Matter, although this time Foster was playing backing music rather than producing, a role given to George Martin. This album was another success, going to number one, with the title track making to the top-10 category in the singles charts.

The next few years had Rogers scoring several top country hits on a regular basis, including "Twenty Years Ago", "Morning Desire", and "Tomb of the Unknown Love", among others. On January 28, 1985, Rogers was one of the 45 artists who recorded the worldwide charity song "We Are the World" to support hunger victims in Africa. The following year, he played at Giants Stadium.

In 1988, Rogers won a Grammy Award for Best Country Collaboration with Vocals with Ronnie Milsap—"Make No Mistake, She's Mine". In the 1990s, Rogers continued to chart with singles such as "The Factory" and "Crazy in Love", another selection Kim Carnes provided him, "If You Want to Find Love", and "The Greatest". His second Christmas album, Christmas in America, was released in 1989 for Reprise Records. From 1991 to 1994, Rogers hosted The Real West on A&E, and on the History Channel since 1995 (reruns only on the History Channel). He visited Miller's during this time. From 1992 to 1995, Rogers co-owned and headlined Branson, Missouri's 4,000-seat Grand Palace Theatre. In 1994, Rogers released his "dream" album titled Timepiece on Atlantic Records. It consisted of 1930s/1940s jazz standards, the type of music he had performed in his early days with the Bobby Doyle Three in Houston.

In 1996, Rogers released an album Vote for Love, where the public requested their favorite love songs and Rogers performed the songs. (Several of his own hits were in the final version.) The album was the first for the TV shopping channel QVC's record label, onQ Music. The album, sold exclusively by QVC, was a huge success and was later issued in stores under a variety of different titles. It reached number one in the UK country charts under the title Love Songs (a title also used for various compilations) and also crossed over into the mainstream charts.

In 1999, Rogers scored with the single "The Greatest", a song about life from a child's point of view (looked at through a baseball game). The song reached the top 40 of Billboard's Country Singles chart and was a Country Music Television number-one video. It was on Rogers's album She Rides Wild Horses the following year (itself a top-10 success). Also in 1999, Rogers produced a song, "We've Got It All", specifically for the series finale of the ABC show Home Improvement.

=== 2000–2015 ===
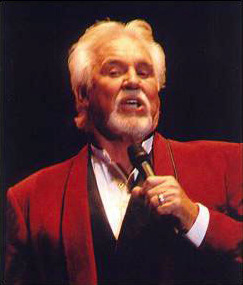
Rogers in 2004

In 2000 (and at age 61), Rogers was back at number one for the first time in more than a decade with the single "Buy Me a Rose". In doing so, he broke a 26-year-old record held by Hank Snow (who, in April 1974, was 59 when he scored with "Hello Love"). Rogers held the record until 2003, when then-70-year-old Willie Nelson became the oldest artist to have a number one on the country charts with his duet with Toby Keith, "Beer for My Horses".

Although Rogers did not record new albums for a few years, he continued to have success in many countries with more greatest hits packages. In 2004's 42 Ultimate Hits, which was the first hits collection to span his days with the First Edition to the present, reached number six on the American country charts and went gold. It also featured two new songs, "My World Is Over" with Whitney Duncan and "We Are the Same". The former was released as a single and was a minor hit. In 2005, The Very Best of Kenny Rogers, a double album, sold well in Europe. It was the first new solo Rogers hits album to reach the United Kingdom for over a decade, despite many compilations there that were not true hits packages.

Rogers also signed with Capitol Records and had more success with the TV-advertised release 21 Number Ones in January 2006. Although this CD did contain 21 chart-toppers as the title claims (recorded between 1976 and the present day), this was not a complete collection of Rogers's number-one singles, omitting such singles as "Crazy in Love" and "What About Me?"

Capitol followed 21 Number Ones with Rogers's new studio album, Water & Bridges, in March 2006 on the Capitol Nashville Records label. The first single from the album was "I Can't Unlove You", which peaked at number 17 on the country charts, after spending over six months on the hit list, more than 50 years after he formed his first group and 38 years after his first major hit as leader of the First Edition; the song remains in recurrent airplay on some radio stations today. "I Can't Unlove You" was followed up with the second single from the album, "The Last Ten Years (Superman)", in September 2006. The third single, "Calling Me", which features Don Henley, became popular in early 2007, and was nominated for a Grammy at the 2007 Grammy Awards. Also in 2007, the 1977 Kenny Rogers album was reissued as a double CD, also featuring the 1979 Kenny album and this once again put Rogers's name into the sales charts worldwide. The following year, another compilation album (A Love Song Collection) also charted.

On August 26, 2008, Rogers released 50 Years exclusively at Cracker Barrel stores. The album included some of Rogers's greatest hits, plus three new songs. The release was designed to celebrate Rogers's 50th year in the music business. In 2007, the England national rugby union team adopted Rogers's song "The Gambler" as their unofficial 2007 Rugby World Cup anthem, after hearing prop Matt Stevens playing it in the team hotel. Before the semifinal against France and the final against South Africa, Rogers sent video messages of support to the team in light of them choosing his song.

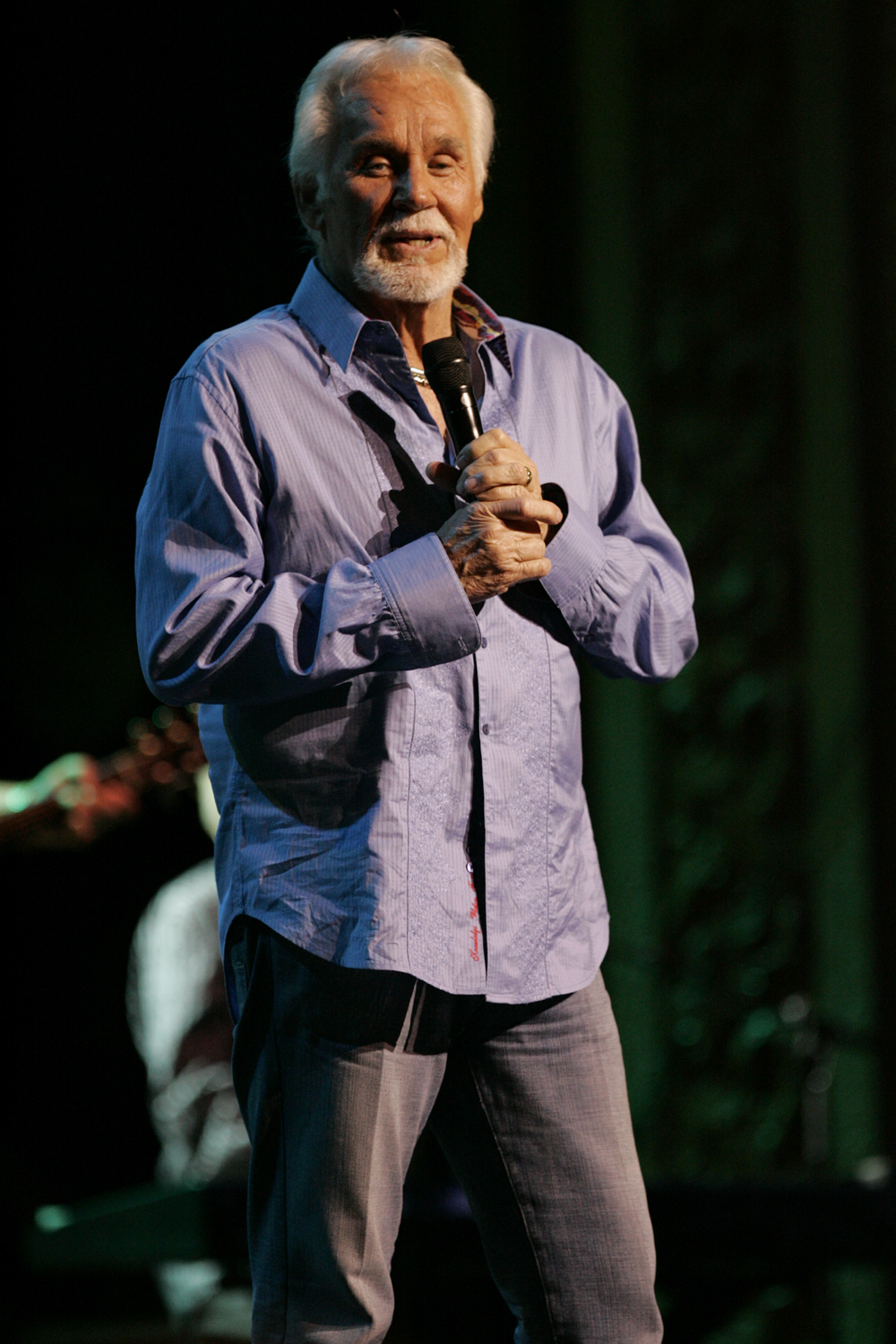
Rogers in 2012 at the State Theatre in Sydney, Australia

In 2008, Rogers toured with his Christmas Show. He split the show up, making the first half his "best of" and the second half his Christmas songs. In 2009, Rogers embarked on his 50th Anniversary Tour.

On April 10, 2010, a TV special was taped, Kenny Rogers: The First 50 Years. Dolly Parton and Lionel Richie were among those set to perform with Rogers during a show celebrating his contribution to country, blues, and pop music. It took place at the MGM Grand in Foxwoods. The TV special was executive produced by Gabriel Gornell and Colleen Seldin and aired on GAC in North America and BBC worldwide.

On June 10, 2012, Rogers appeared on stage with the musical group Phish to perform his hit song "The Gambler" at the Bonnaroo Music and Arts Festival. Also in 2012, Rogers re-recorded the hit song "Lady", a duet with its songwriter Lionel Richie, on Richie's album Tuskegee. The pair also performed the song live at the 2012 ACM concert, Lionel Richie and Friends.

On April 10, 2013, the CMA announced that Rogers would be a 2013 inductee into the Country Music Hall of Fame, along with Cowboy Jack Clement and Bobby Bare. In June 2013, he performed at the Glastonbury Festival in England in the Sunday afternoon 'Legends' slot.

In 2013, Rogers recorded a new album with the name You Can't Make Old Friends. This album included the title track, a new duet with Dolly Parton, which was his first single released in six years.

Rogers recorded 65 albums and sold over 165 million records.

=== Retirement ===
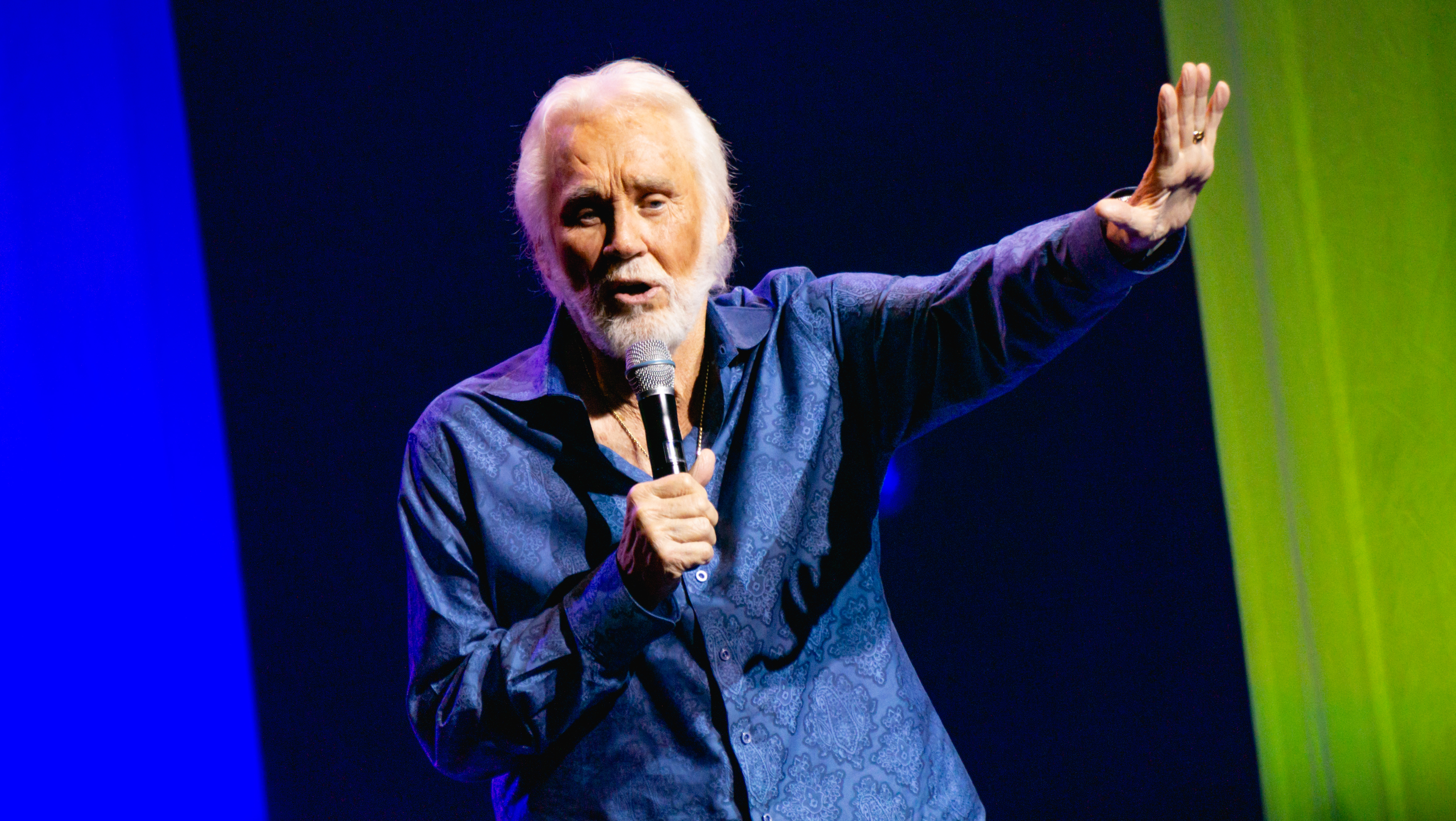
Kenny Rogers in 2016 at the London Palladium

In 2015, Rogers announced his farewell tour, titled The Gambler's Last Deal. He stated his intention to retire from touring at its completion, although he was considering the possibility of recording another studio album. In announcing the tour, Rogers indicated at the time that his final tour appearance would be on NBC's Today show. Concert dates were scheduled through 2018 and included visits to the United States, Australia, Scotland, Ireland, England, the Netherlands, and Switzerland. On April 5, 2018, though, Rogers canceled his remaining tour as advised by doctors due to a series of health problems.

Rogers's final concert in Nashville took place on October 25, 2017, at the Bridgestone Arena, where he was joined by an array of guest artists, including Linda Davis, Elle King, Little Big Town, Lionel Richie, Billy Currington, Lee Greenwood, The Flaming Lips, The Oak Ridge Boys, Justin Moore, Travis Tritt, the Judds, Kris Kristofferson, Alison Krauss, Chris Stapleton, Lady Antebellum, Idina Menzel, Crystal Gayle, Reba McEntire, and Jamey Johnson. The concert also included a special appearance by long-time friend Dolly Parton, who serenaded Rogers with her signature "I Will Always Love You" and performed "You Can't Make Old Friends" and "Islands in the Stream" with Rogers for the final time.

=== Bloodline ===
Although Rogers used many session musicians to play instruments on his recordings, he was backed on tours by the group Bloodline since 1976. The group originally started as three pieces. In The Journey (a 2006 documentary about his career), Rogers said he did not understand singers who changed their touring band every year, and that he stuck with Bloodline as they already "know the songs". Members of Bloodline have included Steve Glassmeyer, Chuck Jacobs, Randy Dorman, Gene Golden, Bobby Daniels, Rick Harper, Edgar Struble, Lynn Hammann, Warren Hartman, Gene Sisk, Brian Franklin, Mike Zimmerman, and Amber Randall.

== Acting and other ventures ==
Rogers also had success as an actor. His 1982 movie Six Pack, in which he played a race-car driver, took in more than $20 million at the United States box office, while made-for-TV movies such as The Gambler series, Christmas in America, and Coward of the County (based on hit songs of his) topped ratings lists. He also served as host and narrator for the A&E historical series The Real West.

Rogers said that photography was once his obsession, before it morphed into a passion. He authored the photo books Kenny Rogers' America (1986) and Your Friends and Mine (1987).

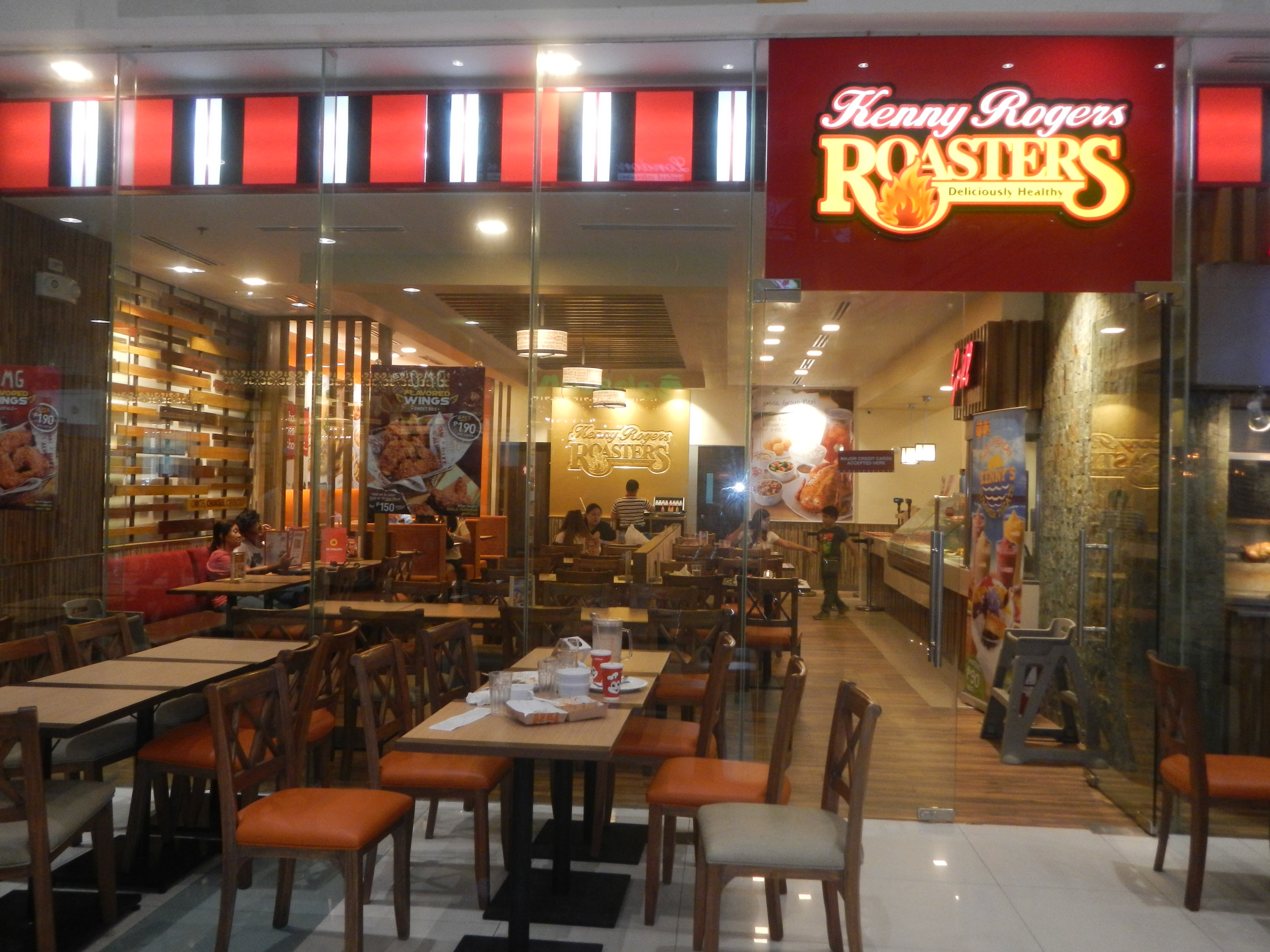
Kenny Rogers Roasters

As an entrepreneur, he collaborated with former Kentucky Fried Chicken CEO John Y. Brown Jr. in 1991 to start up the restaurant chain Kenny Rogers Roasters. The chicken and ribs chain, which is similar to Boston Market, featured in an episode of the NBC sitcom Seinfeld called "The Chicken Roaster". Season four of the TV series Fresh Off the Boat depicts the chain as owning a share of Louis Huang's Cattleman's Ranch restaurant and then filing for bankruptcy. Rogers is shown from the back, but played by Jeff Pomerantz in the episode "Let Me Go, Bro".

Rogers put his name to the Gambler Chassis Co., a sprint-car racing manufacturer started by C. K. Spurlock in Hendersonville, Tennessee. The company used the name from Rogers's hit song "The Gambler". During the 1980s and 1990s, Gambler was one of the fastest and widely used sprint cars, with such drivers as Steve Kinser, Sammy Swindell, and Doug Wolfgang driving the cars to victory in the World of Outlaws and the famous Knoxville Nationals. Gambler sprint cars were also successful in Australia, with drivers such as Garry Rush and Steve Brazier using Gamblers to win multiple Australian Sprintcar Championships. Rush also used a Gambler chassis to win the unofficial 1987 World Sprintcar Championship at the Claremont Speedway in Perth, Western Australia.

In October 2012, Rogers released the book Luck or Something Like It: A Memoir about the ups and downs in his musical career.

In 2014, Rogers appeared as himself in a GEICO commercial, singing part of his song "The Gambler" a cappella while acting as the dealer in a card game.

== Personal life and death ==
Rogers was married five times and had five children. His first marriage was to Janice Gordon on May 15, 1958; they divorced in April 1960 with one child, a daughter. He married his second wife, Jean, in October 1960: they divorced in 1963. His third marriage was to Margo Anderson in October 1963; they divorced in 1975 and had a son. He married his fourth wife, actress Marianne Gordon, on October 1, 1977; they divorced in 1993, and had a son. His fifth marriage was to Wanda Miller on June 1, 1997. They had twin sons and remained married for 22 years until his death.

At Beaver Dam Farms, a former estate in Colbert, Georgia, Rogers kept a pet goat named Smitty. He acquired the animal from a friend in 2008. Rogers described the goat as "(his) center", providing a calming influence after long and stressful touring schedules.

Rogers's six-decade career wound down by 2017, as he encountered health problems that included a diagnosis of Alzheimer's disease and bladder cancer. Rogers died while under hospice care at his home in Sandy Springs, Georgia, on March 20, 2020, at age 81. He was interred in Oakland Cemetery in Atlanta.

== Discography ==
- Love Lifted Me (1976)
- Kenny Rogers (1976)
- Daytime Friends (1977)
- Every Time Two Fools Collide (with Dottie West) (1978)
- Love or Something Like It (1978)
- The Gambler (1978)
- Classics (with Dottie West) (1979)
- Kenny (1979)
- Gideon (1980)
- Share Your Love (1981)
- Christmas (1981)
- Love Will Turn You Around (1982)
- We've Got Tonight (1983)
- Eyes That See in the Dark (1983)
- What About Me? (1984)
- Once Upon a Christmas (with Dolly Parton) (1984)
- The Heart of the Matter (1985)
- They Don't Make Them Like They Used To (1986)
- I Prefer the Moonlight (1987)
- Something Inside So Strong (1989)
- Christmas in America (1989)
- Love Is Strange (1990)
- Back Home Again (1991)
- If Only My Heart Had a Voice (1993)
- Timepiece (with David Foster) (1994)
- Vote for Love (1996)
- The Gift (1996)
- Across My Heart (1997)
- Christmas from the Heart (1998)
- She Rides Wild Horses (1999)
- There You Go Again (2000)
- Back to the Well (2003)
- Water & Bridges (2006)
- The Love of God (2011)
- You Can't Make Old Friends (2013)
- Once Again It's Christmas (2015)
- Life Is Like a Song (2023)

== Filmography ==
=== Film ===
Year	Title	Role	Director	Notes	Ref.
1982	Six Pack	Brewster Baker	Daniel Petrie		
2001	Longshot	Pilot	Lionel C. Martin		

=== Television ===
Year	Title	Role	Notes	Ref.
1973	Saga of Sonora	Balladeer	Made-for-TV film directed by Marty Pasetta	
1975	The Dream Makers	Earl	Made-for-TV film directed by Boris Sagal	
1979	The Tonight Show Starring Johnny Carson	Guest host	One episode aired on September 10	
1980	Kenny Rogers as The Gambler	Brady Hawkes	Made-for-TV film directed by Dick Lowry	
1981	Coward of the County	Uncle Matthew	Made-for-TV film directed by Dick Lowry	
1983	Kenny Rogers as The Gambler: The Adventure Continues	Brady Hawkes	Made-for-TV film directed by Dick Lowry	
1985	Wild Horses	Matt Cooper	Made-for-TV film directed by Dick Lowry	
1987	Kenny Rogers as The Gambler, Part III: The Legend Continues	Brady Hawkes	Made-for-TV film directed by Dick Lowry	
1990	The Super Dave Osborne Show	Carl Hodges / Himself	Episode: "Atomic Yo–yo"	
1990	Christmas in America	Frank Morgan	Made-for-TV film directed by Eric Till	
1991	The Gambler Returns: The Luck of the Draw	Brady Hawkes	Made-for-TV film directed by Dick Lowry	
1992	The Real West	Host/narrator	Television documentary	
1993	Rio Diablo	Quentin Leech	Made-for-TV film directed by Rod Hardy	
1994	Dr. Quinn, Medicine Woman	Daniel Watkins	Episode: "Portraits"	
1994	The Gambler V: Playing for Keeps	Brady Hawks	Made-for-TV film directed by Jack Bender	
1994	MacShayne: Winner Takes All	John J. 'Jack' MacShayne	Made-for-TV film directed by E.W. Swackhamer	
1994	MacShayne: The Final Roll of the Dice	John J. 'Jack' MacShayne	Made-for-TV film directed by E.W. Swackhamer	
1995	Big Dreams and Broken Hearts: The Dottie West Story	Himself	Made-for-TV film directed by Bill D'Elia	
1996	Cybill	Himself (Uncredited)	Episode: "A Who's Who for What's His Name"	
1997	Get to the Heart: The Barbara Mandrell Story	Himself	Made-for-TV film directed by Jerry London	
2000	Touched by an Angel	Denny Blye	Episode: "Buy Me a Rose"	
2003	Reno 911!	Himself	Episodes: "Dangle's Promotion" and "Security for Kenny Rogers"	
2009	How I Met Your Mother	Himself as Kindly Book Narrator (voice)	Episode: "Duel Citizenship"	

== Awards and honors ==
Year	Award	Category
2017	Texas Country Music Hall of Fame	Inductee
2017	Smithsonian Institution	Special Achievement Award
2013	Country Music Association Awards	Willie Nelson Lifetime Achievement Award
2013	Country Music Hall of Fame	Inducted into the Country Music Hall of Fame
2010	American Eagle Award	American Eagle Award
2009	ACM Honors	Cliffie Stone Pioneer Award (w/ Jerry Reed, Randy Travis, Hank Williams Jr.)
2007	ASCAP Golden Note Award	ASCAP Golden Note Award
2007	CMT Music Awards	Album of the Year—Water & Bridges
2005	CMT Music Awards	Favorite All Time Country Duet—"Islands In the Stream" (w/Dolly Parton)
2004	CMT's 100 Greatest Cheating Songs	"Ruby Don't Take Your Love to Town"—No. 6
2003	International Entertainment Buyers Association	Lifetime Achievement Award
2003	CMT's 100 Greatest Country Songs	"The Gambler"—No. 26
2002	CMT's 40 Greatest Men of Country Music	Ranking—No. 19
2000	TNN Music Awards	Career Achievement Award
1999	BBC's Greatest Country Singer	Ranking—No. 2
1988	Grammy Awards	Best Duo Country Vocal Performance—"Make No Mistake She's Mine" (w/ Ronnie Milsap)
1986	USA Today	Favorite Singer of All Time
1985	American Music Awards	Favorite Country Album—Eyes That See in the Dark
1985	American Music Awards	Favorite Male Country Artist
1983	Academy of Country Music Awards	Single of the Year—"Islands In the Stream" (w/ Dolly Parton)
1983	Academy of Country Music Awards	Top Vocal Duet (w/ Dolly Parton)
1983	American Music Awards	Favorite Pop/Rock Country Artist
1983	American Music Awards	Favorite Country Single—"Love Will Turn You Around"
1983	ASAP Awards	Favorite Single—"Islands In the Stream" (w/Dolly Parton)
1982	American Music Awards	Favorite Country Album—Greatest Hits
1981	American Music Awards	Favorite Pop/Rock Male Artist
1981	American Music Awards	Favorite Country Album—The Gambler
1981	American Music Awards	Favorite Country Single—"Coward of the County"
1980	American Music Awards	Favorite Male Country Artist
1980	American Music Awards	Favorite Country Album—The Gambler
1980	Music City News Country	Single of the Year
1979	American Music Awards	Favorite Male Country Artist
1979	American Music Awards	Favorite Country Album—10 Years of Gold
1979	Country Music Association Awards	Male Vocalist of the Year
1979	Country Music Association Awards	Vocal Duo of the Year (w/ Dottie West)
1979	Country Music Association Awards	Album of the Year—The Gambler
1979	Music City News Country	Male Vocalist of the Year
1979	Music City News Country	Single of the Year—"The Gambler"
1979	Music City News Country	Duet of the Year (w/ Dottie West)
1979	Grammy Awards	Best Male Country Vocal Performance—"The Gambler"
1978	American Music Awards	Favorite Single—"Lucille"
1978	Country Music Association Awards	Vocal Duo of the Year (w/Dottie West)
1978	Academy of Country Music Awards	Male Artist of the Year
1978	Academy of Country Music Awards	Album of the Year —"Kenny Rodgers"
1978	Academy of Country Music Awards	Song of the Year —"Lucille"
1978	Academy of Country Music Awards	Single of the Year —"Lucille"
1978	Grammy Awards	Best Male Country Vocal Performance—"Lucille"
1977	Country Music Association Awards	Single of the Year—"Lucille"

== Record labels ==
The following is a list of record labels to which Rogers signed:

- Cue (1957, with the band the Scholars and also as a solo singer)
- Carlton (1958, solo deal)
- KenLee (one single, label owned by Rogers and his brother Lelan)
- Columbia (1960s, with jazz combo, the Bobby Doyle Three)
- Reprise (1967, with the First Edition, all material recorded during this time has since been acquired by Universal Music Group)
- Jolly Rogers (1973, with the First Edition, label was owned by Rogers)
- United Artists (1975, solo deal)
- Liberty (1980, United Artists merged into EMI/Capitol in 1980; some pressings of albums were issued on Capitol's imprint labels, EMI, EMI America, and EMI Manhattan.)
- RCA Records (1983, solo deal)
- Reprise (1989, solo deal)
- Giant (1993, one solo album)
- Atlantic (1994, one solo album)
- onQ Music (1996, one solo album; onQ Music was created by the QVC Network to release exclusive albums for sale only on QVC. The first onQ release was Rogers's Vote for Love, a two-disc set that would later become available in standard retail stores.)
- Magnatone (1996, solo deal)
- Dreamcatcher (1998, solo deal; Dreamcatcher was owned and run by Rogers and Jim Mazza for the purpose of releasing Rogers's albums and certain reissues of Rogers's catalog. Other artists, such as Marshall Dyllon and Randy Dorman, were also released on Dreamcatcher Records. The label closed in 2004.)
- Capitol Nashville (2004, solo deal)

== See also ==
- Brady Hawkes
