= Anthony Smith (singer) =

American singer-songwriter

- Born: Ralph Anthony Smith
- Origin: Nashville, Tennessee
- Genres: Country
- Occupations: Singer-songwriter, record producer, guitarist
- Instruments: Vocals, electric guitar
- Years active: 2002–present
- Labels: Mercury Nashville, Krankit Records
- Website: anthonysmith.com

Ralph Anthony Smith is an American singer, songwriter and record producer. As a Nashville recording artist, Smith's debut album, If That Ain't Country, on Mercury Records Nashville . Produced three Top 40 singles on the Billboard Hot Country Singles & Tracks (now Hot Country Songs) charts. As a songwriter Smith has had over 250 songs recorded by other Nashville recording artist Such as George Strait, Blake Shelton, Tim McGraw, Rascal Flatts, Trace Adkins, Faith Hill and more.

== Biography ==
Anthony Smith was raised in eastern Tennessee His musical interests began at the early age of 5. At age nine, he had joined his first band, and by age twelve he was arranging music at his church. Smith moved to Kentucky in his early 20s and joined several bands. Luke Lewis, the boss of Mercury Nashville Records, received a demo tape of Smith's music, and signed the artist to a record deal. Meanwhile, Smith wrote songs for other artists, including "Run and "Cowboys Like Us" by George Strait, "I'm Tryin'" and "Chrome" by Trace Adkins, "Didn't I" and "What Do Ya Think About That" by Montgomery Gentry, and "What Brothers Do" by Confederate Railroad. "My Worst Fear" for Rascal Flatts "Kristofferson" for Tim McGraw "Chasing Down a Good Time" by Randy Houser

Smith's debut album was released on Mercury Nashville, the same year that he was granted a songwriting deal from BMI. The album, titled If That Ain't Country, produced three Top 40 singles, of which the title track was the highest-charting. After exiting Mercury, Smith continued to write songs for other artists, including "Cowboys Like Us", another single release by George Strait. In 2007, two other singles that Smith co-wrote entered the country charts "Daisy" by Halfway to Hazard, and "What Do Ya Think About That", another release by Montgomery Gentry. In 2008, Tim McGraw charted in the Top 20 with "Kristofferson", which Smith co-wrote with Reed Nielsen. In 2016, released the Houser single "Chasing Down a Good Time" which Smith co-wrote with Jeffrey Steele. Later that year, he signed to a second recording contract, this time with Stroudavarious Records. His first single for the label, "Bringin' Back the Sunshine", was released in July 2009, and debuted at No. 60 on the Hot Country Songs chart. Smith also released an extended play for the label, then left in early 2010 to form his own label, Krankit Records. His first release on this label was "Love Is Love Is Love."

== Discography ==
=== Studio albums ===
Title	Album details	Peak chart positions	
Title	Album details	US Country	US Heat
If That Ain't Country	Release date: June 25, 2002; Label: Mercury Nashville; Formats: CD	26	16

=== Extended plays ===
Title	Album details
Sunshine EP	Release date: September 1, 2009; Label: Stroudavarious Records; Formats: CD, music download

=== Singles ===
Year	Single	Peak positions	Album
Year	Single	US Country	Album
2002	"If That Ain't Country"	26	If That Ain't Country
2002	"John J. Blanchard"	40	If That Ain't Country
2003	"Half a Man"	40	If That Ain't Country
2009	"Bringin' Back the Sunshine"	60	Sunshine EP
2010	"Love Is Love Is Love"	—	Non-album song
"—" denotes releases that did not chart

=== Music videos ===
Year	Video	Director
2002	"If That Ain't Country"	Charley Randazzo
2009	"Bringin' Back the Sunshine"	Traci Goudie
2010	"Love Is Love Is Love"	Marcel
