= Trace Adkins discography =

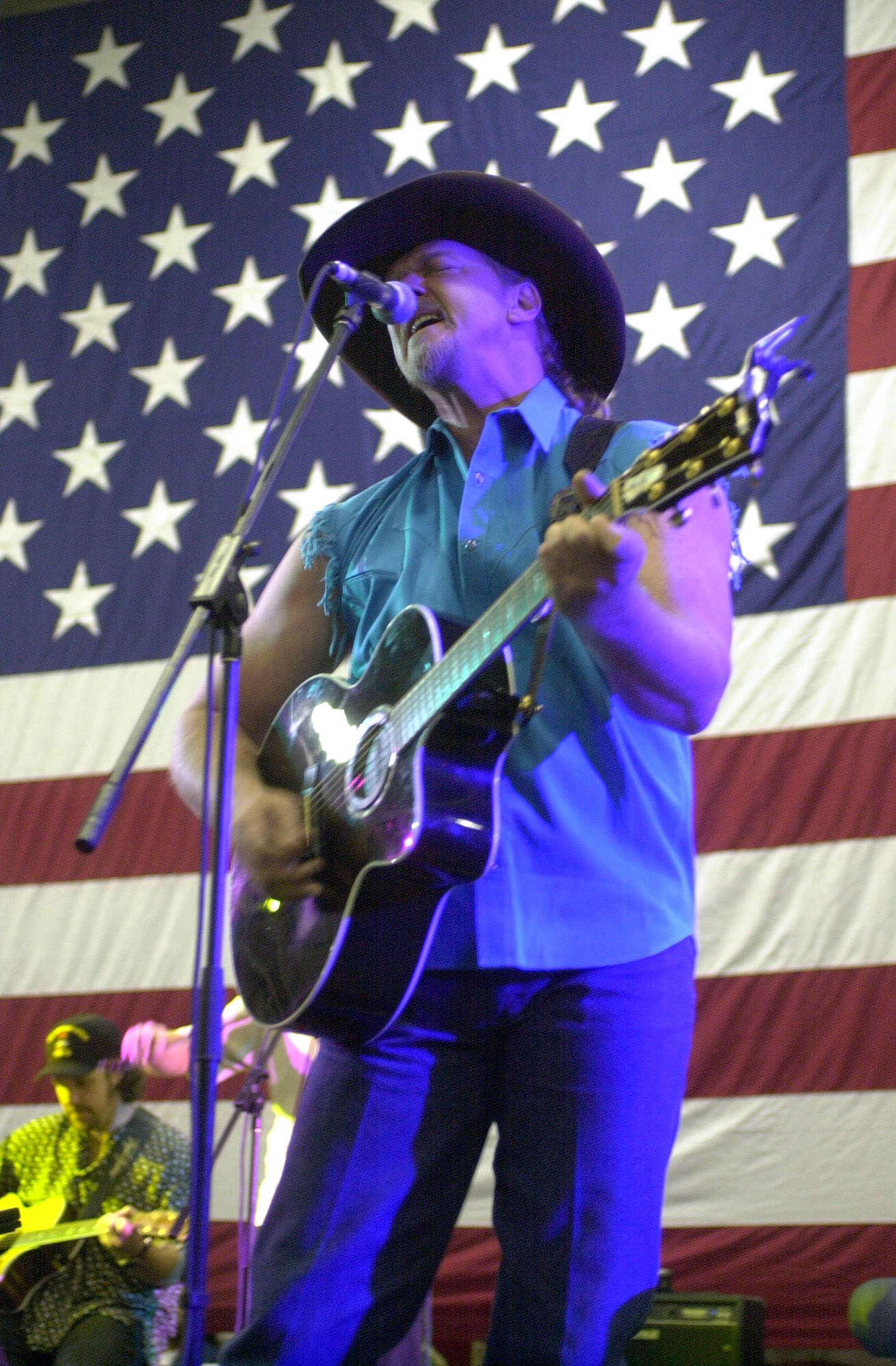
- Studio albums: 14
- Extended plays: 1
- Compilation albums: 6
- Singles: 40
- Music videos: 35

Trace Adkins is an American country music singer. His discography consists of fourteen studio albums and six greatest hits albums. Of his 14 studio albums, six have been certified by the RIAA: 1997's Big Time is certified Gold, as are 2001's Chrome, and 2006's Dangerous Man. His 1996 debut Dreamin' Out Loud and 2003's Comin' On Strong are certified Platinum. 2005's Songs About Me is his best-selling album, certified 2× Platinum by the RIAA. Two of Adkins' compilation albums, Greatest Hits Collection, Vol. 1 and American Man: Greatest Hits Volume II are certified Platinum

Adkins has also released 40 singles to country radio, all but seven of which have reached Top 40 on the Billboard country charts. This total includes four Number Ones: "(This Ain't) No Thinkin' Thing" (1997), "Ladies Love Country Boys" (2007), "You're Gonna Miss This" (2008), which is also his highest Billboard Hot 100 peak at number 12, and "Hillbilly Bone" (2009-2010), a duet with Blake Shelton. Ten more of his singles are Top 10 hits on the country charts, including the number 2 "Honky Tonk Badonkadonk" from late 2005-early 2006, which is also his only other Top 40 pop hit at number 30. "You're Gonna Miss This" and 2004's "Rough & Ready" are both gold-certified digital singles, and "Honky Tonk Badonkadonk" is certified platinum as a mastertone.

== Studio albums ==
=== 1990s ===
Title	Album details	Peak chart positions				Certifications
Title	Album details	US Country	US	US Heat	CAN Country	Certifications
Dreamin' Out Loud	Release date: June 25, 1996; Label: Capitol Nashville; Formats: CD, cassette	6	53	1	16	RIAA: Platinum
Big Time	Release date: October 21, 1997; Label: Capitol Nashville; Formats: CD, cassette	7	50	—	26	RIAA: Gold
More…	Release date: November 2, 1999; Label: Capitol Nashville; Formats: CD, cassette	9	82	—	—	
"—" denotes releases that did not chart.

=== 2000s ===
Title	Album details	Peak chart positions		Certifications
Title	Album details	US Country	US	Certifications
Chrome	Release date: October 9, 2001; Label: Capitol Nashville; Formats: CD, cassette	4	59	RIAA: Gold
Comin' On Strong	Release date: December 2, 2003; Label: Capitol Nashville; Formats: CD	3	31	RIAA: Platinum
Songs About Me	Release date: March 22, 2005; Label: Capitol Nashville; Formats: CD, music download	1	11	RIAA: 2× Platinum
Dangerous Man	Release date: August 15, 2006; Label: Capitol Nashville; Formats: CD, music download	1	3	RIAA: Gold
X	Release date: November 25, 2008; Label: Capitol Nashville; Formats: CD, music download	7	32	

=== 2010s and 2020s ===
Title	Album details	Peak chart positions		
Title	Album details	US Country	US	US Indie
Cowboy's Back in Town	Release date: August 17, 2010; Label: Show Dog-Universal Music; Formats: CD, music download	1	5	—
Proud to Be Here	Release date: August 2, 2011; Label: Show Dog-Universal Music; Formats: CD, music download	2	3	—
Love Will...	Release date: May 14, 2013; Label: Show Dog-Universal Music; Formats: CD, music download	6	14	—
The King's Gift	Release date: October 29, 2013; Label: Caliburn; Formats: CD, music download	12	75	11
Something's Going On	Release date: March 31, 2017; Label: Wheelhouse; Formats: CD, music download	5	35	3
The Way I Wanna Go	Release date: August 27, 2021; Label: Verge; Format: CD, digital download	41	—	—
"—" denotes releases that did not chart.

== Compilation albums ==
Title	Album details	Peak chart positions		Certifications
Title	Album details	US Country	US	Certifications
Greatest Hits Collection, Vol. 1	Release date: July 8, 2003; Label: Capitol Nashville; Formats: CD	1	9	RIAA: Platinum
Honky Tonk Badonkadonk	Release date: June 26, 2006; Label: EMI International; Formats: CD	—	—	
American Man: Greatest Hits Volume II	Release date: December 4, 2007; Label: Capitol Nashville; Formats: CD, music download	3	22	RIAA: Platinum
The Definitive Greatest Hits: 'Til the Last Shot's Fired	Release date: October 12, 2010; Label: Capitol Nashville; Formats: CD, music download	12	62	
10 Great Songs	Release date: April 3, 2012; Label: Capitol Nashville; Formats: CD, music download	38	—	
Icon	Release date: March 19, 2013; Label: Capitol Nashville; Formats: CD, music download	55	—	
10 Great Songs: 20th Century Masters: The Millennium Collection	Release date: April 1, 2014; Label: Universal Music Group; Formats: CD	43	—	
"—" denotes releases that did not chart.

== Extended plays ==
Title	Album details
Ain't That Kind of Cowboy	Release date: October 16, 2020; Label: Verge Records; Formats: Digital download

== Singles ==
=== 1990s ===
Year	Single	Peak chart positions			Certifications	Album
Year	Single	US Country Songs	US	CAN Country	Certifications	Album
1996	"There's a Girl in Texas"	20	—	33		Dreamin' Out Loud
1996	"Every Light in the House"	3	78	10	RIAA: Gold	Dreamin' Out Loud
1997	"(This Ain't) No Thinkin' Thing"	1	—	1		Dreamin' Out Loud
1997	"I Left Something Turned On at Home"	2	—	1		Dreamin' Out Loud
1997	"The Rest of Mine"	4	70	5		Big Time
1998	"Lonely Won't Leave Me Alone"	11	— (Note: "Lonely Won't Leave Me Alone" did not enter the Hot 100, but peaked at number 12 on Bubbling Under Hot 100 Singles, which acts as a 25-song extension of the Hot 100.)	10		Big Time
1998	"Big Time"	27	—	22		Big Time
1999	"Don't Lie"	27	— (Note: "Don't Lie" did not enter the Hot 100, but peaked at number 19 on Bubbling Under Hot 100 Singles, which acts as a 25-song extension of the Hot 100.)	45		More…
"—" denotes releases that did not chart

=== 2000s ===
Year	Single	Peak chart positions				Certifications	Album
Year	Single	US Country Songs	US	CAN Country (Note: Chart positions from RPM Country Tracks from 1996 to 2000, Radio & Records from 2004 to 2006, and Canada Country from 2008 to present.)	CAN	Certifications	Album
2000	"More"	10	65	4	—		More…
2000	"I'm Gonna Love You Anyway"	36	—	71 (Note: "I'm Gonna Love You Anyway" reached number 71 when RPM ceased publication in November 2000.)	—		More…
2001	"I'm Tryin'"	6	44	x	—		Chrome
2002	"Help Me Understand"	17	80	x	—		Chrome
2002	"Chrome"	10	74	x	—		Chrome
2003	"Then They Do"	9	52	x	—		Greatest Hits Collection, Vol.1
2003	"Hot Mama"	5	51	x	—		Comin' On Strong
2004	"Rough & Ready"	13	75	28	—	RIAA: Gold	Comin' On Strong
2004	"Songs About Me"	2	59	15	—	RIAA: Gold	Songs About Me
2005	"Arlington"	16	— (Note: "Arlington" did not enter the Hot 100, but peaked at number 2 on Bubbling Under Hot 100 Singles, which acts as a 25-song extension of the Hot 100.)	—	—		Songs About Me
2005	"Honky Tonk Badonkadonk"	2	30	8	—	RIAA: 3× Platinum	Songs About Me
2006	"Swing"	20	76	35	—	RIAA: Gold	Dangerous Man
2006	"Ladies Love Country Boys"	1	61	14	—	RIAA: Platinum	Dangerous Man
2007	"I Wanna Feel Something"	25	—	—	—		Dangerous Man
2007	"I Got My Game On"	34	—	—	—		American Man: Greatest Hits Volume II
2008	"You're Gonna Miss This"	1	12	1	11	RIAA: 2× Platinum	American Man: Greatest Hits Volume II
2008	"Muddy Water"	22	— (Note: "Muddy Water" did not enter the Hot 100, but peaked at number 9 on Bubbling Under Hot 100 Singles, which acts as a 25-song extension of the Hot 100.)	24	—		X
2009	"Marry for Money"	14	98	5	84		X
2009	"All I Ask For Anymore"	14	95	31	—		X
"—" denotes releases that did not chart "x" indicates that no relevant chart existed or was archived

=== 2010s–2020s ===
Year	Single	Peak chart positions				Certifications	Album
Year	Single	US Country Songs	US Country Airplay	US	CAN Country	Certifications	Album
2010	"Ala-Freakin-Bama"	49		—	—		Cowboy's Back in Town
2010	"This Ain't No Love Song"	15		88	44		Cowboy's Back in Town
2011	"Brown Chicken Brown Cow"	39		—	—		Cowboy's Back in Town
2011	"Just Fishin'"	6		61	19	RIAA: Gold	Proud to Be Here
2011	"Million Dollar View"	38		—	—		Proud to Be Here
2012	"Them Lips (On Mine)"	52		—	—		Non-album single
2013	"Watch the World End" (featuring Colbie Caillat)	—	57	—	—		Love Will...
2016	"Jesus and Jones"	—	41	—	—		Something's Going On
2016	"Lit"	—	—	—	—		Something's Going On
2017	"Watered Down"	—	55	—	—		Something's Going On
2017	"Still a Soldier"	—	—	—	—		Something's Going On
2020	"Better Off"	—	—	—	—		Ain't That Kind of Cowboy
2021	"Where the County Girls At" (featuring Luke Bryan and Pitbull)	—	—	—	—		The Way I Wanna Go
"—" denotes releases that did not chart

=== As a featured artist ===
Year	Single	Peak chart positions					Certifications	Album
Year	Single	US Country Songs	US Country Airplay	US	CAN Country	CAN	Certifications	Album
2001	"America the Beautiful" (Note: Multi-artist collaboration featuring Trace Adkins, Billy Dean, Vince Gill, Carolyn Dawn Johnson, Toby Keith, Brenda Lee, Lonestar, Martina McBride, Jamie O'Neal, Kenny Rogers, and Keith Urban.)	58		—	—	—		Non-album singles
2009	"My First Ride" (Ronnie Milsap featuring Trace Adkins)	—		—	—	—		Non-album singles
2009	"We've Got a Pulse" (Gene Watson featuring Trace Adkins)	—		—	—	—		A Taste of the Truth
2009	"Hillbilly Bone" (Blake Shelton featuring Trace Adkins)	1		40	8	84	RIAA: Platinum	Hillbilly Bone
2013	"Working on a Building" (Marty Raybon featuring Trace Adkins, T. Graham Brown and Jimmy Fortune)	—	—	—	—	—		Working on a Building
2019	"Hell Right" (Blake Shelton featuring Trace Adkins)	14	18	99	36	—	RIAA: Gold	Fully Loaded: God's Country
"—" denotes releases that did not chart.

== Other charted songs ==
Year	Single	Peak chart positions		Album
Year	Single	US Country Songs	US Bubbling	Album
1998	"The Christmas Song"	64	—	Dillard's Country Christmas Collection 1999
2005	"Honky Tonk Badonk Adonk" [sic] (Note: "Honky Tonk Badonkadonk" originally charted at number 58 on Hot Country Songs in early 2005 as "Honky Tonk Badonk Adonk" before being released as a single.)	58	—	Songs About Me
2009	"Til the Last Shot's Fired"	50	5	X
"—" denotes releases that did not chart

== Videography ==
=== Music videos ===
Year	Video	Director
1996	"There's a Girl in Texas"	Michael Merriman
1996	"Every Light in the House"	Michael Merriman
1997	"(This Ain't) No Thinkin' Thing"	Michael Merriman
1997	"The Rest of Mine"	Michael Merriman
1998	"Lonely Won't Leave Me Alone"	Michael Merriman
1999	"Don't Lie"	Peter Zavadil
2000	"More"	Steven Goldmann
2001	"I'm Tryin'"	Steven Goldmann
2002	"Help Me Understand"	Trey Fanjoy
2002	"Chrome"	Michael Salomon
2003	"Then They Do"	Deaton Flanigen
2003	"Hot Mama"	Michael Salomon
2004	"Rough & Ready"	Michael Salomon
2005	"Songs About Me"	Michael Salomon
2005	"Arlington"	Trey Fanjoy
2005	"Honky Tonk Badonkadonk"	Michael Salomon
2006	"Swing"	Michael Salomon
2006	"Ladies Love Country Boys"	Michael Salomon
2007	"I Wanna Feel Something"	Wes Edwards
2007	"I Got My Game On"	Michael Salomon
2008	"You're Gonna Miss This"	Peter Zavadil
2008	"Muddy Water"	Trey Fanjoy
2008	"I Can't Outrun You"	David Poag
2009	"Marry for Money"	Michael Salomon
2009	"All I Ask for Anymore"	Deaton Flanigen
2010	"This Ain't No Love Song"	Michael Salomon
2011	"Brown Chicken, Brown Cow"	Michael Salomon
2011	"Just Fishin'"	Trey Fanjoy
2012	"Tough People Do"	Heflin Bros.
2013	"Watch the World End" (with Colbie Caillat)	Emily Hawkins
2016	"Jesus and Jones"	Peter Zavadil
2017	"Watered Down"	Jim Shea
2017	"Lit"	Todd Tue
2018	"Still a Soldier"	Jon Small

==== Guest appearances ====
Year	Video	Director
2001	"America the Beautiful" (Various)	Marc Ball
2009	"Hillbilly Bone" (with Blake Shelton)	Roman White
2019	"Hell Right" (with Blake Shelton)	Sophie Muller
