= The Definitive Greatest Hits: 'Til the Last Shot's Fired =

Greatest hits album by Trace Adkins
- Released: October 12, 2010
- Genre: Country
- Length: 101:28
- Label: Capitol Nashville
- Producer: Various original producers

Trace Adkins chronology
Cowboy's Back in Town (2010)	The Definitive Greatest Hits: 'Til the Last Shot's Fired (2010)	Proud to Be Here (2011)

Professional ratings
Review scores
Source	Rating
Allmusic	4/5 stars

The Definitive Greatest Hits: 'Til the Last Shot's Fired is the twelfth album, and the third compilation album from American country music artist Trace Adkins. It was released on October 12, 2010, through Capitol Nashville. The album includes all of his Top 40 hits for the label except "I'm Gonna Love You Anyway" (from the album More…), as well as the non-singles "Dangerous Man" and "'Til the Last Shot's Fired". These cuts were previously found on the albums Dangerous Man and X, respectively.

== Critical reception ==
Stephen Thomas Erlewine of Allmusic gave the album four stars out of five, calling it "an overview of his peak that is indeed definitive."

== Track listing ==
Disc 1
No.	Title	Writer(s)	Length
1.	"Honky Tonk Badonkadonk" (original version)	Randy Houser, Dallas Davidson, Jamey Johnson	4:00
2.	"Rough & Ready"	Brian Gene White, Craig Wiseman, Blair Mackichan	3:08
3.	"(This Ain't) No Thinkin' Thing"	Tim Nichols, Mark D. Sanders	4:01
4.	"Chrome"	Anthony Smith, Jeffrey Steele	3:21
5.	"Marry for Money"	Jimmy Melton, Dave Turnbull	3:03
6.	"Then They Do"	Sunny Russ, Jim Collins	4:30
7.	"Swing"	Chris Stapleton, Frank Rogers	3:37
8.	"I Left Something Turned On at Home"	Billy Lawson, John Schweers	3:07
9.	"I'm Tryin'"	A. Smith, Steele, Chris Wallin	3:41
10.	"All I Ask For Anymore"	Casey Beathard, Tim James	3:57
11.	"Big Time"	Larry Boone, Paul Nelson, Kenny Beard	3:49
12.	"There's a Girl in Texas"	Vip Vipperman, Trace Adkins	3:31
13.	"Hot Mama"	Tom Shapiro, Beathard	3:19
14.	"Arlington"	Jeremy Spillman, Turnbull	4:09

Disc 2
No.	Title	Writer(s)	Length
1.	"Ladies Love Country Boys"	J. Johnson, George Teren, Rivers Rutherford	3:42
2.	"Lonely Won't Leave Me Alone"	Jody Alan Sweet, Mary Danna	3:06
3.	"You're Gonna Miss This"	Ashley Gorley, Lee Thomas Miller	3:43
4.	"Muddy Water"	Monty Criswell, Rick Huckaby	3:54
5.	"'Til the Last Shot's Fired"	Rob Crosby, Doug Johnson	5:00
6.	"Songs About Me"	Shaye Smith, Ed Hill	3:22
7.	"I Wanna Feel Something"	David Lee, Tony Lane	3:48
8.	"The Rest of Mine"	Adkins, Beard	3:13
9.	"I Got My Game On"	Collins, J. Johnson, Teren	3:10
10.	"Every Light in the House"	Kent Robbins	3:00
11.	"Don't Lie"	Chet Biggers, Rogers	4:03
12.	"More"	Del Gray, Thom McHugh	3:05
13.	"Help Me Understand"	Chris Farren, Steve Mac, Wayne Hector	3:50
14.	"Dangerous Man"	Wiseman, Brad Crisler	3:19

== Charts ==
=== Weekly charts ===
Chart (2010)	Peak position
US Billboard 200	62
US Top Country Albums (Billboard)	12

=== Year-end charts ===
Chart (2011)	Position
US Top Country Albums (Billboard)	65
