= Andrea Zonn =

American singer and fiddle player (born 1969)

Andrea Erica Zonn (born 1969) is a singer and fiddle player who grew up in Urbana, Illinois. She grew up in an environment surrounded by music. She sings, and plays classical violin, and is fluent in numerous other musical genres. Zonn first met Alison Krauss at a fiddle contest at the Champaign County Fair when she was 10 (and Alison 8). Though the two young musicians shared a common musical heritage, their paths became more distinct. Zonn began her university studies at age 15, at the University of Illinois at Urbana-Champaign, then transferred to Vanderbilt University in 1986.

Zonn has toured with Vince Gill, Lyle Lovett, and since 2003, with James Taylor. Zonn has recorded with James Taylor, Yo Yo Ma, Vince Gill, Mickey Newbury, Randy Travis, Trisha Yearwood, Martina McBride, Bart Millard, George Strait, Amy Grant, Alison Krauss, Alison Brown, Lyle Lovett, Keb' Mo' and Neil Diamond.

Zonn co-produced the Hands Across the Water project, a collaborative CD to raise funds for Asian tsunami of December, 2004.

In 2010 Zonn joined the Troubadour Reunion Tour supporting James Taylor and Carole King, and toured with Trace Adkins in November and December 2013 in support of his Celtic Christmas album entitled The King's Gift.

In 2014 Andrea Zonn traveled with James Taylor on tour in support of his two-disc retrospective CD 'The Essential James Taylor'. As a part of this tour she was a backup singer and violinist, in addition to being a part of the overall back up band led by drummer Steve Gadd and bassist Jimmy Johnson. She was part of the four-voice backing vocal group with Arnold McCuller, Kate Markowitz, and David Lasley, replacing the late Valerie Carter.

== Discography ==
- Love Goes On 2003
- Hands Across The Water (Producer) 2005
- Rise (Producer) 2015
