= Lonely Won't Leave Me Alone =

Lonely Won't Leave Me Alone may refer to:

- Lonely Won't Leave Me Alone (Jermaine Jackson song)
- Lonely Won't Leave Me Alone (Trace Adkins song)
