= All Hat and No Cattle =

All hat and no cattle is an idiom meaning "all talk, no action". It can also refer to:

- All Hat and No Cattle, a 2013 album by Chris Shiflett & the Dead Peasants
- "All Hat, No Cattle", a song by artist Trace Adkins in his album More...
- Marshals (TV series) S2E1: "All Hat No Cattle"
