= Just Fishin' =

Single by Trace Adkins

from the album Proud to Be Here
- Released: March 21, 2011
- Genre: Country
- Length: 3:30
- Label: Show Dog-Universal Music
- Songwriters: Casey Beathard; Monty Criswell; Ed Hill
- Producer: Michael Knox

Trace Adkins singles chronology
"Brown Chicken Brown Cow" (2011)	"Just Fishin'" (2011)	"Million Dollar View" (2011)

"Just Fishin'" is a song written by Casey Beathard, Monty Criswell, and Ed Hill and recorded by American country music artist Trace Adkins. It was released in March 2011 as the first single for Adkins' second album for Show Dog-Universal Music, Proud to Be Here. On November 30, 2011, the song received a Nomination in 54th Grammy Awards for Best Country Song. To date, this is Adkins' final Top 10 hit.

== Content ==
"Just Fishin'" is a song about a father who is fishing with his daughter. The little daughter only worries about catching fish but father says that they are not "just fishin'" but also making memories. It is in B major with a main chord pattern of B-E-B and a vocal range of G♯3-C♯5.

== Critical reception ==
Blake Boldt of Engine 145 gave the song a "thumbs up", praising the "sharp details" and "little snapshots of domestic bliss" in the lyrics. It received a four-out-of-five star rating from Matt Bjorke of Roughstock, who said that it "finds Trace comfortably back in father mode". Both Bjorke and Boldt compared the song favorably to Adkins' earlier singles "Then They Do" and "You're Gonna Miss This". Kevin John Coyne, reviewing the song for Country Universe, gave it a B rating, saying that he wished the song weren't "quite so heavy-handed about driving home the theme; a subtler approach could have made it a Strait-type classic."

== Music video ==
The music video was directed by Trey Fanjoy and premiered in June 2011. It features Trace and his youngest daughter, Trinity.

== Chart performance ==
"Just Fishin'" entered the Hot Country Songs charts at number 40 on the chart dated for the week ending April 9, 2011. It also debuted at number 98 on the U.S. Billboard Hot 100 chart for the week of June 18, 2011. On the chart dated September 10, 2011, "Just Fishin'" entered the Top Ten, giving Adkins his first Top Ten single since "You're Gonna Miss This" in 2008. It peaked at number 6 in October 2011.

== Charts ==
Chart (2011)	Peak position
US Hot Country Songs (Billboard)	6
US Billboard Hot 100	61

Year-end charts

Chart (2011)	Position
US Country Songs (Billboard)	9

== Certifications ==
Region	Certification	Certified units/sales
United States (RIAA)	Gold	500,000^{‡}
^{‡} Sales+streaming figures based on certification alone.
