= Ultimate Cowboy Showdown =

American reality TV show

- Genre: Reality series
- Presented by: Trace Adkins
- Country of origin: United States
- No. of seasons: 4
- No. of episodes: 36

Original release
- Network: INSP

Ultimate Cowboy Showdown is an American TV reality series, which aired in the United States on INSP and streaming platforms. It first aired in October 2019 and is hosted by Trace Adkins. The show has run for four seasons, with the latest airing in November 2023.

== Premise ==
Each season contestants compete in a variety of areas, such as wrangling and sorting cattle, roping and horsemanship skills. In each episode, a contestant is eliminated from the competition. The winner receives a prize a package worth $50,000, including a herd of cattle.

== Series ==
The first season aired in 2019 with six episodes. Jason Davis from Washington DC, Cuatro Houston and J Storme Jannise from Texas, Hadley Hunting from Wyoming, Jared Lee from Florida, Ethan Treadwell from Oklahoma, Derek Lacasa and Juan Carlos Villalpando from California, Cole Sandau from North Dakota, Tara Powers from Iowa, Cody Brewer from Tennessee and Zane Runyan from New Mexico competed for the title. Zane Runyan was crowned the winner of the first season.

In November 2019, the show was renewed for a second season, and premiered in February 2021. Season 2 was expanded to 10 episodes, with Colton Angel, Morgan Flitter, Hannah Castillitto, Lonnie Luke, Juan Carlos Montes, Roveskey Hickman, Ora Brown, Cole Wideman, Jackson Taylor, Jennifer Hudgins, Hunter Arnold Groveton, Tyler Kijac, JP Gonzalez and Katey Jo Gordon competing in this season. Katey Jo Gordon was crowned winner of season 2 in May 2021.

UCS Season 3 was greenlit in August 2021 and premiered on INSP in April 2022. The contestants for season 3 included Cody Anthony, Keaton Barger Chris Becker, Sal Campos, Buck Faust, Sara Foti, Stephen Heitman, Brianna Markum-McClain, Coy Melancon, Eddie Pena, Jim Smith, Cody Traylor, Jamon Turner, and Stephen Yellowtail. The overall winner for season 3 was Coy Melancon, with the final episode airing in June 2022.

The series returned in September 2023 for its fourth instalment. The season consisted of previous contestants from the first three seasons and was titled an "all-star season." The season finale aired in November 2023, with Tyler Kijac winning the season finale. He had previously appeared on season two of UCS.

== Episodes ==
Series	Episodes	Originally released	
Series	Episodes	First released	Last released
1	6	14 October 2019	20 October 2019
2	10	24 February 2021	28 April 2021
3	10	21 April 2022	23 June 2022
4	10	6 September 2023	8 November 2023

=== Season 1 (2019) ===
No. overall	No. in season	Title	Original release date
1	1	"The Ultimate Cowboy"	October 14, 2019
Twelve cowboys from across the U.S. move onto a cattle ranch where bonds and friendships are made. Host Trace Adkins puts the cowboys through their paces to decide who goes home.
2	2	"The Weakest Link"	October 15, 2019
The remaining cowboys in a timed calf roping challenge. A team challenge helps show which cowboys are performing well.
3	3	"Friendship the Hard Way"	October 16, 2019
The pressure ramps up with only eight cowboys left. One cowboy this episode wins immunity, with fierce competition between the remaining contestants.
4	4	"Eye of the Storm"	October 17, 2019
J Storme as the last remaining woman continues to perform well. In a shock elimination, two cowboys are sent home.
5	5	"The Big Boss Man"	October 18, 2019
The remaining four are tested by Trace Adkins to demonstrate essential cowboy skills. Rookie mistakes are made even by the strongest contestants.
6	6	"End of the Trail"	October 20, 2019
The season finale is the final showdown for the remaining cowboys. The final trio have to battle it out to see who is the top all-round cowboy.

=== Season 2 (2021) ===
No. overall	No. in season	Title	Original release date
7	1	"The Ultimate Cowboy: Bigger in Texas"	February 24, 2021
Hours after arriving in Texas the fourteen cowboys lock horns over some brutal challenges. Trace Adkins is joined by two expert judges to decide who is eliminated.
8	2	"Lines in the Sand"	March 3, 2021
This weeks challenges include barrel racing and calf roping for the 13 remaining cowboys.
9	3	"Caught Double-Crossin'"	March 10, 2021
A relay race over six-stages tests the cowboys horsemanship skills. The lengthy test gives the judges and Adkins enough to decide to send two cowboys home.
10	4	"Who's the Cowboss?"	March 17, 2021
The remaining cowboys must show off their roping and riding skills to stay in the competition. Their business sense is also tested when they are asked to estimate the value of livestock.
11	5	"Snakes in the Grass"	March 24, 2021
With the season narrowing down the cowboys to the last eight, they must snatch flags off running steers and herd cattle.
12	6	"Showdown at the Arena"	March 31, 2021
Now half of the original twelve must fight it out for the final set of episodes. A challenge goes badly for one contestant, meaning Trace Adkins has to send one home.
13	7	"Steered Off Course"	April 7, 2021
The cowboys face off when they must ride a wild horse across open terrain. A simple map is presented to the contestants to try and find cattle.
14	8	"A Bull's Market"	April 14, 2021
The IQ of the remaining cowboys is tested along with how they communicate in a difficult situation with an unruly bull.
15	9	"Every Cowboy for Themselves"	April 21, 2021
The four that are left are tested with a race to rope and load two steers without help. Trace Adkins and the two experts must make the difficult decision on which cowboy misses out on the season finale.
16	10	"End of the Trail"	April 28, 2021
The finale with the three cowboys that have outwitted some of the best cowboys in the country. The best of the trio will win a life changing $50,000 at the end of the episode.

=== Season 3 (2022) ===
No. overall	No. in season	Title	Original release date
17	1	"Conquering the West"	April 21, 2022
The season starts at a new destination for the series, the mountains of Wyoming. 14 new cowboys meet for the first of many grueling challenges. Who will be the first cowboy to go home?
18	2	"Leading the Pack"	April 28, 2022
This weeks challenge puts the thirteen through a tough task to wrangle 60 wild horses and drive them down a mountain. The challenge makes it clear who host Trace Adkins should send home.
19	3	"A Storm Is Coming"	May 5, 2022
As a windstorm hits the competition ranch, the judges use a relay race to test the twelve remaining cowboys. Who will survive the unique windstorm test in this early episode.
20	4	"City Slicker Showdown"	May 12, 2022
In this unique episode, the remaining cowboys must teach novices how to be cowhands. They aren't any old novices but former professional football players Vernon Davis and Glenn Gronkowski.
21	5	"Grit on the Open Range"	May 19, 2022
After a fireside talent show to lighten the mood, the competition gets serious with the remaining cowboys tasked with breaking and riding wild horses.
22	6	"Boiling Point on the Ranch"	May 26, 2022
Now half of the original twelve must fight it out for the final set of episodes. A challenge goes badly for one contestant, meaning Trace Adkins has to send one home.
23	7	"Tipping the Scales"	June 2, 2022
The six remaining cowboys move cows around a giant tic-tac-toe board, before loading cattle that must weigh 15,000 pounds.
24	8	"Buffalo Wild"	June 9, 2022
With only five remaining from the original episode, the cowboys are tested on their solo cattle-sorting skills. How easily can they extract a buffalo from a herd.
25	9	"Heart of a Champion"	June 16, 2022
The last four cowboys must impress host Trace Adkins with their own horses and complete a task on a horse none of them have seen before.
26	10	"The Final Drive"	June 23, 2022
The finale with the three cowboys that have outwitted some of the best cowboys in the country. The best of the trio will win the $50,000 herd of cattle.

=== Season 4 (2023) ===
No. overall	No. in season	Title	Original release date
27	1	"All-Star Showdown"	September 6, 2023
The first episode of the new season brings back 14 cowboys from previous seasons for an all star cast. They are given a second opportunity to win $50,000 of cattle.
28	2	"Grit, Guts and Danger"	September 13, 2023
The all-star season turns up the heat on the contestants, but one of the remaining cowboys goes missing in the Arizona desert, causing concern for the host and other cowboys.
29	3	"Sabotage and Soul Searching"	September 20, 2023
The cowboys are forced to question their values and what lengths they would go to if they want to win. They are given a choice to help or sabotage fellow contestants. The host makes the decision to eliminate two cowboys this week.
30	4	"Cowboy Up"	September 27, 2023
Both brains and power are needed as a cowboy, with the contestants seen which of them have both. They must guess common ranch items, then guard cattle overnight. Two cowboys are sent packing this week.
31	5	"Down and Dirty"	October 4, 2023
The competition really gets competitive with the nine remaining cowboys. One is rushed to hospital after a freak incident and a straightforward horse race takes an unexpected turn.
32	6	"Broken Down"	October 11, 2023
Calf-roping skills are the test this week, with a challenge to drive a herd of cattle with an old-fashioned chuck wagon across challenging terrain.
33	7	"Tipping the Scales"	October 18, 2023
With half of the original all-star cast eliminated, the remaining must complete a grueling relay race and a series of challenges.
34	8	"The Longhorn Goodbye"	October 25, 2023
The face off in a cutting competition turns out to be difficult. 4 rogue cattle must be sorted and loaded into a trailer.
35	9	"The Final Five"	November 1, 2023
The five remaining cowboys struggle with wild colts as they are made to ride them through an obstacle course. They must rope as many steers as possible within a set time limit.
36	10	"The Ultimate All-Star"	November 8, 2023
Trace Adkins must name the winner of the all-star season in the final episode from the three remaining cowboys.
