= Million Dollar View =

Single by Trace Adkins

from the album Proud to Be Here
- Released: November 19, 2011
- Genre: Country
- Length: 3:21
- Label: Show Dog-Universal Music
- Songwriter(s): David Lee Murphy, George Teren
- Producer(s): Kenny Beard, Mark Wright

Trace Adkins singles chronology
"Just Fishin'" (2011)	"Million Dollar View" (2011)	"Them Lips (On Mine)" (2012)

"Million Dollar View" is a song recorded by American country music artist Trace Adkins. It was released in November 2011 as the second and final single from the album Proud to Be Here. The song reached #38 on the Billboard Hot Country Songs chart. The song was written by David Lee Murphy and George Teren.

== Chart performance ==
Chart (2011)	Peak position
US Hot Country Songs (Billboard)	38
