= Something's Going On (Trace Adkins album) =

Something’s Going On

Studio album by Trace Adkins
- Released: March 31, 2017
- Genre: Country
- Length: 42:03
- Label: Wheelhouse
- Producer: Mickey Jack Cones

Trace Adkins chronology
Love Will... (2013)	Something’s Going On (2017)	The Way I Wanna Go (2021)

Singles from Something's Going On
- 1. "Jesus and Jones" Released: January 19, 2016; 2. "Lit" Released: July 25, 2016; 3. "Watered Down" Released: January 24, 2017; 4. "Still a Soldier" Released: November 6, 2017

Something's Going On is the sixteenth studio album by American country music artist Trace Adkins. It was released on March 31, 2017 via Wheelhouse Records.

== Commercial performance ==
The album debuted at No. 35 on the Billboard 200, and No. 5 on Top Country Albums in its first week of release. It sold 13,400 copies (14,000 units including track and stream album equivalent units) in the first week, and a further 4,000 in the second week. The album has sold 38,500 copies in the US as of September 2017.

== Track listing ==
No.	Title	Writer(s)	Length
1.	"Ain't Just the Whiskey Talkin'"	Brett Beavers, Terry McBride	3:26
2.	"Jesus and Jones"	Casey Beathard, Tyler Farr, Jim McCormick	3:46
3.	"Watered Down"	Matt Jenkins, Shane McAnally, Trevor Rosen	3:08
4.	"Something's Going On"	Chris Cavanaugh, Mark Stephen Jones	3:47
5.	"If Only You Were Lonely"	Jon Coleman, Troy Johnson	4:05
6.	"Gonna Make You Miss Me"	Andrew Dorff, Tommy Lee James, Matt Nolen	3:42
7.	"I'm Gone"	Max T. Barnes, Craig Campbell	3:29
8.	"Country Boy Problems"	James, Josh Osborne	3:27
9.	"Lit"	Monty Criswell, Derek George, Mickey Jack Cones	3:28
10.	"Still a Soldier"	Wade Kirby, Phil O'Donnell	3:17
11.	"Whippoorwills and Freight Trains"	Brandon Kinney, Jeff Middleton, O'Donnell	3:45
12.	"Hang"	Lynn Hutton, O'Donnell	3:43
Total length:			42:03

== Personnel ==
Adapted from AllMusic

- Trace Adkins - lead vocals
- Jim "Moose" Brown - keyboards
- Perry Coleman - background vocals
- Mickey Jack Cones - acoustic guitar, electric guitar, keyboards, programming, background vocals
- Dan Dugmore - steel guitar
- Shelly Fairchild - background vocals
- Jeneé Fleenor - fiddle
- Derek George - background vocals
- Kenny Greenberg - electric guitar
- Tony Harrell - keyboards
- Wes Hightower - background vocals
- Mark Hill - bass guitar
- Mike Johnson - steel guitar
- Jeff King - electric guitar
- Troy Lancaster - electric guitar
- B. James Lowry - acoustic guitar
- Angela Primm - background vocals
- Adam Tefteller - background vocals
- Brady Tilow - programming
- Solomon Williams - background vocals
- Lonnie Wilson - drums
- Nir Z. - drums

== Charts ==
Chart (2017)	Peak position
US Billboard 200	35
US Top Country Albums (Billboard)	5
