= Comin' On Strong =

Studio album by Trace Adkins
- Released: December 2, 2003
- Genre: Country
- Length: 42:11
- Label: Capitol Nashville
- Producer: Trey Bruce; Scott Hendricks

Trace Adkins chronology
| Greatest Hits Collection, Vol. 1 (2003) | Comin' On Strong (2003) | Songs About Me (2005) |

Singles from Comin' On Strong
- 1. "Hot Mama" Released: September 22, 2003; 2. "Rough & Ready" Released: April 12, 2004

Professional ratings
Review scores
| Source | Rating |
|---|---|
| Allmusic | 4/5 stars |

Comin' On Strong is the fifth studio album by American country music artist Trace Adkins. It was released on December 2, 2003 on Capitol Records Nashville. The album produced two singles — "Hot Mama" and "Rough & Ready", which respectively reached No. 5 and No. 13 on the US Billboard Hot Country Songs charts. The album was certified platinum by the RIAA.

The track "I'd Sure Hate to Break Down Here" was later recorded by Julie Roberts as "Break Down Here" on her self-titled debut album. Her version was released as a single in early 2004, peaking at No. 18 on the country charts.

The song "Hot Mama" also appears on the game Karaoke Revolution Party.

== Track listing ==
| No. | Title | Writer(s) | Length |
|---|---|---|---|
| 1. | "Hot Mama" | Tom Shapiro; Casey Beathard | 3:20 |
| 2. | "Comin' On Strong" | David Lee; Tony Lane | 3:02 |
| 3. | "Then Came the Night" | John Kilzer; Chuck Jones | 4:38 |
| 4. | "I'd Sure Hate to Break Down Here" | Patrick Jason Matthews; Jess Brown | 4:01 |
| 5. | "Missing You" | Tim Mensy; Monty Criswell | 5:15 |
| 6. | "One of Those Nights" | Shapiro; Jason Sellers | 3:48 |
| 7. | "Untamed" | George Teren; Criswell | 3:49 |
| 8. | "Then I Wake Up" | Mensy; Criswell | 4:09 |
| 9. | "One Nightstand" | Matthews; Trey Bruce | 3:46 |
| 10. | "Baby's Gone" | Tim Nichols; Mark D. Sanders; Tia Sillers | 3:15 |
| 11. | "Rough & Ready" | Brian Gene White; Craig Wiseman; Blair MacKichan | 3:08 |
| Total length: | | | 42:11 |

== Personnel ==
As listed in liner notes.

- Trace Adkins – lead vocals
- Mike Brignardello – bass guitar
- Trey Bruce – percussion, programming
- Pat Buchanan – electric guitar, harmonica
- Lisa Cochran – background vocals
- J. T. Corenflos – electric guitar
- Vicki Hampton – background vocals
- Aubrey Haynie – fiddle, mandolin
- Wes Hightower – background vocals
- Steve Hinson – pedal steel guitar, lap steel guitar
- Liana Manis – background vocals
- Greg Morrow – drums, shaker
- Gordon Mote – piano, Hammond B-3 organ, Wurlitzer electric piano, synthesizer, synthesizer strings
- Alison Prestwood – bass guitar
- Michael Spriggs – acoustic guitar, Dobro
- Jonathan Yudkin – fiddle, mandolin, banjo, cello

== Chart performance ==
=== Weekly charts ===
| Chart (2003) | Peak position |
|---|---|
| US Billboard 200 | 31 |
| US Top Country Albums (Billboard) | 3 |

=== Year-end charts ===
| Chart (2004) | Position |
|---|---|
| US Billboard 200 | 101 |
| US Top Country Albums (Billboard) | 18 |
| Chart (2005) | Position |
| US Top Country Albums (Billboard) | 57 |

=== Singles ===
| Year | Single | Peak chart positions | | Certifications (sales threshold) |
| Year | Single | US Country | US | Certifications (sales threshold) |
|---|---|---|---|---|
| 2003 | "Hot Mama" | 5 | 51 | |
| 2004 | "Rough & Ready" | 13 | 75 | US: Gold |

== Certifications ==
| Region | Certification |
|---|---|
| United States (RIAA) | Platinum |
