= Don't Lie (Trace Adkins song) =

Single by Trace Adkins

from the album More...
- B-side: "All Hat, No Cattle"
- Released: September 18, 1999
- Genre: Country
- Length: 4:03
- Label: Capitol Nashville
- Songwriter(s): Frank Rogers, Chet Biggers
- Producer(s): Paul Worley

Trace Adkins singles chronology
"Big Time" (1998)	"Don't Lie" (1999)	"More" (2000)

"Don't Lie" is a song recorded by American country music artist Trace Adkins. It was released in September 1999 as the first single from the album More.... The song reached #27 on the Billboard Hot Country Singles & Tracks chart. The song was written by Frank Rogers and Chet Biggers.

== Chart performance ==
Chart (1999)	Peak position
US Hot Country Songs (Billboard)	27
US Billboard Hot 100	119
Canadian RPM Country Tracks	45
