= Songs About Me =

Studio album by Trace Adkins
- Released: March 22, 2005
- Genre: Country; Southern rock
- Length: 40:48
- Label: Capitol Nashville
- Producer: Scott Hendricks (all tracks except 4, 7, 11); Dann Huff (tracks 4, 7, 11)

Trace Adkins chronology
Comin' On Strong (2003)	Songs About Me (2005)	Dangerous Man (2006)

Singles from Songs About Me
- 1. "Songs About Me" Released: December 13, 2004; 2. "Arlington" Released: June 11, 2005; 3. "Honky Tonk Badonkadonk" Released: October 3, 2005

Professional ratings
Review scores
Source	Rating
Allmusic	3/5 stars

Songs About Me is the sixth studio album by American country music artist Trace Adkins. It was released on March 22, 2005, via Capitol Records Nashville. His highest-selling album to date, it has been certified 2× Platinum by the RIAA and had sold 1.5 million copies. Singles from this album include the title track, "Arlington", and "Honky Tonk Badonkadonk". The title track and "Honky Tonk Badonkadonk" both went to No.2 and "Arlington" went to No.16 on the U.S. BillboardHot Country Songs charts. "Honky Tonk Badonkadonk" was also a Top 40 hit on the Billboard Hot 100 and Pop 100 charts as well.

The track "Metropolis" was originally recorded by Anthony Smith on his 2003 album If That Ain't Country, and Sammy Kershaw on his 2003 album I Want My Money Back.

== Track listing ==
No.	Title	Writer(s)	Length
1.	"Songs About Me"	Shaye Smith; Ed Hill	3:24
2.	"Arlington"	Jeremy Spillman; Dave Turnbull	4:07
3.	"Find Me a Preacher"	Shane Minor; Wendell Mobley	3:43
4.	"My Way Back"	Neil Thrasher; Tony Martin	3:51
5.	"I Wish It Was You"	Tom Shapiro; Steve Bogard	4:07
6.	"Bring It On"	George Teren; Rivers Rutherford	3:42
7.	"My Heaven"	Chris Wallin; Jim Collins	3:25
8.	"Baby I'm Home"	Dylan Altman; Fred Wilhelm; Billy Falcon	3:58
9.	"Metropolis"	Anthony Smith; Wallin	3:20
10.	"I Learned How to Love from You"	Steve Nathan; Tim Mensy	3:05
11.	"Honky Tonk Badonkadonk"	Randy Houser; Dallas Davidson; Jamey Johnson	4:01
Total length:			40:48

== Personnel ==
- Trace Adkins - lead vocals
- Larry Beaird - acoustic guitar
- Bruce Bouton - dobro, pedal steel guitar
- Mike Brignardello - bass guitar
- Pat Buchanan - electric guitar
- Tom Bukovac - electric guitar
- Perry Coleman - background vocals
- J. T. Corenflos - electric guitar
- Eric Darken - percussion
- Chip Davis - background vocals
- Paul Franklin - dobro, pedal steel guitar, lap steel guitar
- Aubrey Haynie - fiddle, mandolin
- Wes Hightower - background vocals
- Dann Huff - electric guitar, soloist
- Jeff King - electric guitar
- Liana Manis - background vocals
- Brent Mason - electric guitar
- Greg Morrow - percussion, drums
- Gordon Mote - synthesizer, piano, Hammond organ
- Nashville String Machine - strings
- Steve Nathan - piano, keyboards, Hammond organ
- Mickey Raphael - harmonica
- John Wesley Ryles - background vocals
- Scotty Sanders - pedal steel guitar
- Michael Spriggs - acoustic guitar
- DeWayne Strobel - electric guitar
- Bryan Sutton - acoustic guitar, banjo, mandolin
- Bobby Terry - acoustic guitar, electric guitar, resonator guitar
- Dennis Wilson - background vocals
- Lonnie Wilson - drums
- Jonathan Yudkin - fiddle, mandolin

== Chart performance ==
Songs About Me was a No.1 album on the US Billboard Top Country Albums chart for the week of April 9–15, 2005. It became a No.11 one on the U.S. Billboard 200 that same year.

=== Weekly charts ===
Chart (2005)	Peak position
US Billboard 200	11
US Top Country Albums (Billboard)	1

=== Year-end charts ===
Chart (2005)	Position
US Billboard 200	157
US Top Country Albums (Billboard)	28
Chart (2006)	Position
US Billboard 200	37
US Top Country Albums (Billboard)	10

=== Singles ===
Year	Single	Peak chart positions			Certifications (sales threshold)
Year	Single	US Country	US	US Pop	Certifications (sales threshold)
2004	"Songs About Me"	2	59	—	RIAA: Gold
2005	"Arlington"	16	102	—	
2005	"Honky Tonk Badonkadonk"	2	30	33	RIAA: 3× Platinum
"—" denotes releases that did not chart

== Certifications ==
Certifications for Songs About Me
Region	Certification	Certified units/sales
United States (RIAA)	2× Platinum	2,000,000^{^}
^{^} Shipments figures based on certification alone.
