= Big Time (Trace Adkins song) =

Single by Trace Adkins

from the album Big Time
- B-side: "Snowball in El Paso"
- Released: May 9, 1998
- Genre: Country
- Length: 3:50
- Label: Capitol Nashville
- Songwriter(s): Larry Boone, Paul Nelson, Kenny Beard
- Producer(s): Scott Hendricks

Trace Adkins singles chronology
"Lonely Won't Leave Me Alone" (1998)	"Big Time" (1998)	"Don't Lie" (1999)

"Big Time" is a song recorded by American country music artist Trace Adkins. It was released in May 1998 as the third and final single and title track from the album Big Time. The song reached #27 on the Billboard Hot Singles & Tracks chart. The song was written by Larry Boone, Paul Nelson and Kenny Beard.

== Chart performance ==
Chart (1998)	Peak position
US Hot Country Songs (Billboard)	27
Canadian RPM Country Tracks	22
