= The Way I Wanna Go =

Studio album by Trace Adkins
- Released: August 27, 2021
- Genre: Country
- Label: Verge
- Producer: Mickey Jack Cones (all tracks except 14); Derek George (all tracks except 10, 14, 16); Kenny Beard (tracks 10, 16); Jon Coleman (track 14)

Trace Adkins chronology
Something's Going On (2017)	The Way I Wanna Go (2021)

Singles from The Way I Wanna Go
- 1. "Where The Country Girls At" Released: June 25, 2021

The Way I Wanna Go is the seventeenth studio album by American country music artist Trace Adkins. It was released on August 27, 2021, via Verge Records. It is promoted as the 25th anniversary album of the singer. The release features 25 songs, including album collaborations with Luke Bryan, Pitbull, Blake Shelton, Melissa Etheridge, Keb' Mo' and Stevie Wonder (on harmonica) and rapper Snoop Dogg.

The album's producers are Mickey Jack Cones, Derek George, Jon Coleman, and Kenny Beard, the last of whom died before the album's release. "Where the Country Girls At", a collaboration with Luke Bryan and Pitbull, was the lead single.

== Track listing ==
1. "Where I Am Today" (Mark Holman, Rhett Akins, Dallas Davidson, Ben Hayslip) – 3:29
2. "Heartbreak Song" (Greg Crowe, Johnny Garcia, Adam Wood) – 3:15
3. "Where the Country Girls At" (Monty Criswell, Derek George, Michael White) (featuring Luke Bryan and Pitbull) – 3:30
4. "Cadillac'n" (Kendell Marvel, Dan Auerbach, Paul Overstreet) – 4:05
5. "Finding My Groove" (Dan Smalley, Casey Beathard, Houston Phillips) – 3:26
6. "Cowboy Boots and Jeans" (Jim Beavers, Lindsay Rimes, Jonathan Singleton) – 3:18
7. "Live It Lonely" (Kelsey Hart, Kyle Schlienger) – 3:25
8. "Love Walks Through the Rain" (Mickey Jack Cones, Marla Cannon-Goodman, Kelly Archer) (featuring Melissa Etheridge) – 3:36
9. "Honey Child" (Criswell, Robert Counts, Jimmy Ritchey) – 4:28
10. "It's a Good Thing I Don't Drink" (Kerry Kurt Phillips, Jamie Teachenor) – 4:01
11. "Jesus Was a Hippie" (Criswell, Randy Montana) – 3:41
12. "Memory to Memphis" (Criswell, George, Curt Chambers) (featuring Keb' Mo' and Stevie Wonder) – 4:00
13. "You're Mine" (Cones, Steven Dale Jones) – 3:58
14. "The Way I Wanna Go" (Barry Dean, Troy Verges, TJ Osborne, John Osborne) – 4:24
15. "It All Adds Up to Us" (Adkins, Kenny Beard, Matt Nolan) – 3:15
16. "If I Was a Woman" (Adkins, Beard, Sherrié Austin, Jeff Bates) (featuring Blake Shelton) – 3:14
17. "Got It Down" (Craig Wiseman, Brandon Kinney) – 3:26
18. "Careful Girl" (Criswell, Tony Lane, Brice Long) – 3:07
19. "Empty Chair" (Lance Miller, David Frasier, Lonnie Fowler) – 3:54
20. "Cowboy Up" (John Pierce, Lane, Jordan Walker) – 3:24
21. "Somewhere in America" (Jon Nite, Hunter Phelps, Michael Hardy, Zach Crowell) – 3:31
22. "So Do the Neighbors" (Criswell, George, Shane Minor, Calvin Broadus) (featuring Snoop Dogg) – 3:44
23. "I Should Let You Go" (Criswell, Tim Mensy) – 4:14
24. "Low Note" (Criswell, George, White) – 2:44
25. "Welcome To" (Wiseman, Jacob Rice, James McCormick) – 3:18

== Charts ==
Chart performance for The Way I Wanna Go
Chart (2021)	Peak position
US Top Country Albums (Billboard)	41
