= More (Trace Adkins song) =

Single by Trace Adkins

from the album More...
- B-side: "The Night He Can't Remember"
- Released: January 24, 2000
- Recorded: 1999
- Genre: Country
- Length: 3:05
- Label: Capitol Nashville
- Songwriters: Del Gray, Thom McHugh
- Producer: Trey Bruce

Trace Adkins singles chronology
"Don't Lie" (1999)	"More" (2000)	"I'm Gonna Love You Anyway" (2000)

"More" is a song written by Del Gray of Little Texas along with Thom McHugh, and recorded by American country music artist Trace Adkins. It was released in January 2000 as the second single and title track from his album of the same name. It peaked at number 10 on the United States Billboard Hot Country Singles & Tracks chart, and number 4 on the Canadian RPM Country Tracks chart.

== Critical reception ==
Deborah Evans Price, of Billboard magazine reviewed the song favorably, saying that when Adkins' "warm-throated baritone comes barreling along, listeners will be absolutely hooked." She calls the production "inventive" and says that it has a "radio-friendly feel and sing-along chorus."

== Music video ==
The music video was directed by Steven Goldmann, and features Trace Adkins during his touring.

== Chart positions ==
"More" debuted at number 65 on the U.S. Billboard Hot Country Singles & Tracks for the week of January 29, 2000.

Chart (2000)	Peak position
Canada Country Singles (RPM)	4
US Billboard Hot 100	65
US Hot Country Songs (Billboard)	10

=== Year-end charts ===
Chart (2000)	Position
US Country Songs (Billboard)	49
