= Big Time (Trace Adkins album) =

Studio album by Trace Adkins
- Released: October 21, 1997
- Studio: Dark Horse (Franklin, Tennessee); Sound Kitchen (Franklin, Tennessee); Recording Arts (Nashville, Tennessee); Scruggs Sound (Berry Hill, Tennessee); Sound Shop (Nashville, Tennessee)
- Genre: Country
- Length: 38:19
- Label: Capitol Nashville
- Producer: Scott Hendricks

Trace Adkins chronology
Dreamin' Out Loud (1996)	Big Time (1997)	More... (1999)

Singles from Big Time
- 1. "The Rest of Mine" Released: September 23, 1997; 2. "Lonely Won't Leave Me Alone" Released: February 24, 1998; 3. "Big Time" Released: May 9, 1998

Professional ratings
Review scores
Source	Rating
AllMusic	3/5 stars
Entertainment Weekly	B

Big Time is the second studio album by the American country music artist Trace Adkins. It was released on October 21, 1997, and contains the singles "The Rest of Mine", "Lonely Won't Leave Me Alone" and "Big Time", which respectively reached No. 4, No. 11 and No. 27 on the Hot Country Songs charts. The album was certified Platinum by the RIAA. "Wayfaring Stranger" can be found on the Sparrow Records compilation album Amazing Grace II.

== Track listing ==
No.	Title	Writer(s)	Length
1.	"Big Time"	Larry Boone, Paul Nelson, Kenny Beard	3:50
2.	"Took Her to the Moon"	Mark Nesler, Byron Hill	2:47
3.	"The Rest of Mine"	Trace Adkins, Beard	3:13
4.	"Snowball in El Paso"	Adkins, Trey Bruce	4:09
5.	"See Jane Run"	Porter Howell, Tim Nichols	2:55
6.	"Twenty-Four, Seven"	J. B. Rudd, Vip Vipperman	3:32
7.	"Hold You Now"	Bob DiPiero, Howell	4:36
8.	"Nothin' but Taillights"	Gerry House, Devon O'Day, DiPiero	3:15
9.	"Lonely Won't Leave Me Alone"	Jody Alan Sweet, Mary Danna	3:06
10.	"Out of My Dreams"	Doug Nichols, Steven Dale Jones	3:12
11.	"Wayfaring Stranger"	Traditional, arranged by Adkins, Scott Hendricks	3:35
Total length:			38:19

== Personnel ==
As listed in liner notes.

Tracks 1–10

- Trace Adkins – lead vocals
- Eddie Bayers – drums
- Bruce Bouton – steel guitar
- Paul Franklin – steel guitar
- Rob Hajacos – fiddle
- Mark Horne – acoustic guitar
- John Jarvis – keyboards, organ
- Brent Mason – electric guitar
- Scott Neubert – acoustic guitar
- Matt Rollings – keyboard, organ
- John Wesley Ryles – background vocals
- Michael Spriggs – acoustic guitar
- Dennis Wilson – background vocals
- Glenn Worf – bass guitar
- Jonathan Yudkin – mandolin

Track 11

- David Grier – acoustic guitar
- Stuart Duncan – fiddle, mandolin
- Roy Huskey, Jr. – upright bass
- Scott Neubert – Dobro
- Michael Spriggs – acoustic guitar

== Charts ==
=== Weekly charts ===
Chart (1997)	Peak position
Canadian Country Albums (RPM)	26
US Billboard 200	50
US Top Country Albums (Billboard)	7

=== Year-end charts ===
Chart (1998)	Position
US Top Country Albums (Billboard)	34

=== Singles ===
Year	Single	Peak chart positions		
Year	Single	US Country	US	CAN Country
1997	"The Rest of Mine"	4	70	5
1998	"Lonely Won't Leave Me Alone"	11	112	10
1998	"Big Time"	27	—	22
"—" denotes releases that did not chart

Certifications

Region	Certification
United States (RIAA)	Platinum
