= There's a Girl in Texas =

Single by Trace Adkins

from the album Dreamin' Out Loud
- B-side: "A Bad Way of Saying Goodbye"
- Released: April 13, 1996
- Genre: Country
- Length: 3:31
- Label: Capitol Nashville
- Songwriters: Trace Adkins; Vip Vipperman
- Producer: Scott Hendricks

Trace Adkins singles chronology
"There's a Girl in Texas" (1996)	"Every Light in the House" (1996)

"There's a Girl in Texas" is a debut song co-written and recorded by American country music artist Trace Adkins. It was released in April 1996 as his debut single, and was served as the lead-off single from his debut album Dreamin' Out Loud. The song peaked at No. 20 on the Billboard Hot Country Singles & Tracks chart in August 1996. The song was written by Adkins and Vip Vipperman.

== Critical reception ==
Wendy Newcomer of Cash Box wrote that "It’s a smooth rendition of the essential radio-receptive debut and should have no problem finding a home on car radios and jukeboxes everywhere."

== Chart performance ==
Chart (1996)	Peak position
Canada Country Singles (RPM)	33
US Hot Country Songs (Billboard)	20
