= Dreamin' Out Loud =

Studio album by Trace Adkins
- Released: June 25, 1996
- Recorded: 1995–1996 at The Sound Shop; Nashville, TN
- Genre: Country
- Length: 33:17
- Label: Capitol Nashville
- Producer: Scott Hendricks

Trace Adkins chronology
Dreamin' Out Loud (1996)	Big Time (1997)

Singles from Dreamin' Out Loud
- 1. "There's a Girl in Texas" Released: April 13, 1996; 2. "Every Light in the House" Released: August 20, 1996; 3. "(This Ain't) No Thinkin' Thing" Released: January 21, 1997; 4. "I Left Something Turned On at Home" Released: April 21, 1997

Dreamin' Out Loud is the debut studio album of American country music artist Trace Adkins. The album was released in 1996, and it features the singles "There's a Girl in Texas", "Every Light in the House", "(This Ain't) No Thinkin' Thing" and "I Left Something Turned On at Home", which peaked at No. 20, No. 3, No. 1, and No. 2, respectively. The album was certified platinum by the Recording Industry Association of America for U.S. shipments of one million copies.

== Critical reception ==
Professional ratings
Review scores
Source	Rating
AllMusic	4/5 stars

Thom Owens of AllMusic commended Adkins' "powerhouse" voice and citing "There's a Girl in Texas" as one of the strongest-written songs on the album. His review criticized the production as being too polished.

== Track listing ==
No.	Title	Writer(s)	Length
1.	"There's a Girl in Texas"	Vip Vipperman, Trace Adkins	3:31
2.	"I Left Something Turned On at Home"	Billy Lawson, John Schweers	3:07
3.	"Every Light in the House"	Kent Robbins	2:59
4.	"(This Ain't) No Thinkin' Thing"	Tim Nichols, Mark D. Sanders	4:01
5.	"Dreamin' Out Loud"	Buddy Blackmon, Micheal Smotherman, Vipperman	3:12
6.	"If I Fall (You're Goin' with Me)"	Walt Aldridge, Will Robinson	3:07
7.	"It Was You"	Craig Wiseman, Trey Bruce	3:24
8.	"I Can Only Love You Like a Man"	Scott Miller, Bernie Nelson	3:49
9.	"634-5789 (Soulsville, U.S.A.)"	Steve Cropper, Eddie Floyd	3:33
10.	"A Bad Way of Saying Goodbye"	Sam Hogin, Jim McBride, Adkins	3:54
Total length:			33:17

== Personnel ==
- Trace Adkins - acoustic guitar, lead vocals
- Eddie Bayers - drums
- Barry Beckett - organ
- Bill Cuomo - synthesizer
- Paul Franklin - steel guitar
- Rob Hajacos - fiddle
- Brent Mason - electric guitar
- Terry McMillan - harmonica
- Matt Rollings - piano
- Michael Spriggs - acoustic guitar
- Dennis Wilson - background vocals
- Glenn Worf - bass guitar
- Curtis "Mr. Harmony" Young - background vocals

== Charts ==
=== Weekly charts ===
Chart (1996–1997)	Peak position
Canadian Country Albums (RPM)	16
US Billboard 200	53
US Top Country Albums (Billboard)	6
US Heatseekers Albums (Billboard)	1

=== Year-end charts ===
Chart (1997)	Position
US Billboard 200	120
US Top Country Albums (Billboard)	15
Chart (1998)	Position
US Top Country Albums (Billboard)	65

=== Singles ===
Year	Single	Peak chart positions		
Year	Single	US Country	US	CAN Country
1996	"There's a Girl in Texas"	20	—	33
1996	"Every Light in the House"	3	78	10
1997	"(This Ain't) No Thinkin' Thing"	1	—	1
1997	"I Left Something Turned On at Home"	2	—	1
"—" denotes releases that did not chart

== Certifications ==
Region	Certification
United States (RIAA)	Platinum
