= Dangerous Man =

Studio album by Trace Adkins
- Released: August 15, 2006
- Genre: Country
- Length: 61:44
- Label: Capitol Nashville
- Producers: Frank Rogers (Tracks 1 - 4 and 8 - 11); Dann Huff (Tracks 5, 6, 12, and 13); Casey Beathard, Kenny Beard, and Trace Adkins (Track 7)

Trace Adkins chronology
Songs About Me (2005)	Dangerous Man (2006)	American Man: Greatest Hits Volume II (2007)

Singles from Dangerous Man
- 1. "Swing" Released: May 15, 2006; 2. "Ladies Love Country Boys" Released: September 18, 2006; 3. "I Wanna Feel Something" Released: April 16, 2007

Dangerous Man is the seventh studio album by American country music singer Trace Adkins, released on August 15, 2006, on Capitol Records Nashville. The album produced three singles on the Billboard Hot Country Songs charts between 2006 and mid-2007. The first of these, "Swing", reached number 20 while the second single, "Ladies Love Country Boys", became his second number one hit and his first since "(This Ain't) No Thinkin' Thing" in 1997. The third single, "I Wanna Feel Something", reached number 25 on the same chart. Overall, Dangerous Man is certified Gold by the RIAA.

== Content ==
The track "I Came Here to Live" was previously recorded by Brad Cotter on his 2004 debut album Patient Man.

== Critical reception ==
Professional ratings
Review scores
Source	Rating
Entertainment Weekly	B−
Slant Magazine	1/5 stars
Stylus Magazine	B

Thomas Inskeep of Stylus Magazine praised the album's collection of country party tracks and soft introspective ballads that allow Adkins to show not only his brand of reckless attitude but also show honest sincerity where Songs About Me failed to deliver, concluding that, "Whether his tempo’s fast or slow, the subject matter lascivious or tender, the mood is consistent across Dangerous Man. It sounds like Adkins has finally nailed down who he is as an artist, and by all accounts, it’s not much different from who he is as a man (by all accounts): a good ol’ boy from Louisiana who's fully embraced it, and found a set of songs that express it. In doing so, he's made the most complete album of his career." Chris Willman of Entertainment Weekly was put-off by the album's mood-shifts between tracks either being endearing or salacious, but praised tracks like "I Wanna Feel Something" and "The Stubborn One" for finding the right balance, saying that "Both prove Adkins can grab us by our hearts and minds... when he's not so fixated on ogling rears or thumping chests." Jonathan Keefe of Slant Magazine heavily criticized the album for being one of the worst the Nashville music assembly line has to offer, with hook-less guitar-driven tracks and cornball ballads being delivered through Adkins' limited range as a performer, concluding that it "isn't awful in any of the creative or important ways that would make it truly dangerous, but in perpetuating every unfortunate, ugly stereotype of the genre, Dangerous Man is still an embarrassment."

== Track listing ==
No.	Title	Writer(s)	Length
1.	"Dangerous Man"	Craig Wiseman, Brad Crisler	3:19
2.	"Ladies Love Country Boys"	Jamey Johnson, George Teren, Rivers Rutherford	3:42
3.	"I Came Here to Live"	Tony Lane	4:29
4.	"Swing"	Chris Stapleton, Frank Rogers	3:38
5.	"Ain't No Woman Like You"	Casey Beathard, Michael White	3:41
6.	"Southern Hallelujah"	Dann Huff, Darrell Brown, Jay DeMarcus	4:10
7.	"I Wanna Feel Something"	David Lee, Lane	3:49
8.	"High"	Pam Rose, Catt Gravitt, Gerald O'Brien	3:50
9.	"Fightin' Words"	Tim James, Kendell Marvel	4:00
10.	"The Stubborn One"	Liz Hengber, Fred Wilhelm	3:53
11.	"Ride"	Wiseman, Peter Kvint	3:58
12.	"Words Get in the Way"	Troy Verges, Aimee Mayo, Gordie Sampson	4:15
13.	"Honky Tonk Badonkadonk" (video remix)	Randy Houser, Dallas Davidson, Johnson	4:00
Total length:			61:44

== DVD extras ==
The "Dangerous Man" CD features a DVD that includes three bonus audio remixes of "Honky Tonk Badonkadonk": A country club mix, a 70's groove mix, and a eurofunk mix. The DVD also features three bonus music videos, for "Honky Tonk Badonkadonk", "Arlington", and "Swing". In addition, the DVD features behind-the-scenes footage and access to ringtones.

== Personnel ==
Adapted from Dangerous Man liner notes.

Musicians

- Tim Akers - keyboards (5, 6, 12)
- Kenny Beard - background vocals (7)
- Casey Beathard - background vocals (7)
- Bekka Bramlett - background vocals (6)
- Mike Brignardello - bass guitar (1–4, 8–11)
- Pat Buchanan - electric guitar (1, 2, 4, 8, 9, 11), baritone guitar (3, 10), mandolin (8)
- Tom Bukovac - electric guitar (5, 6, 12)
- Perry Coleman - background vocals (5, 6, 12)
- Mickey Jack Cones - background vocals (7)
- J. T. Corenflos - electric guitar (1–4, 8–10), six-string bass guitar (1, 11)
- Eric Darken - percussion (all tracks)
- Chris Dunn - trombone (5)
- Paul Franklin - steel guitar (1–4, 8–11)
- Tony Harrell - piano (7), organ (7)
- Aubrey Haynie - fiddle (1–3, 8–11), mandolin (4)
- Wes Hightower - background vocals (1–4, 8–11)
- Jim Horn - baritone saxophone (1), tenor saxophone (1)
- Dann Huff - electric guitar (5, 6, 12)
- Mike Johnson - steel guitar (7, 8), Dobro (10)
- "The Ladies" (Emma Grandillo, Melissa Hayes, Morgane Hayes, Sandy Horowitz, Autumn House, Judy McDonough, Leslie Ann Parsons, Morgan Petek) - background vocals (2)
- Troy Lancaster - electric guitar (7)
- Randy Leago - tenor saxophone (5)
- B. James Lowry - acoustic guitar (2, 3, 8, 11), resonator guitar (9)
- Chris McHugh - drums (5, 6, 12)
- Greg Morrow - drums (1–4, 7–11), percussion (7)
- Gordon Mote - Hammond B-3 organ (1, 9, 11), piano (2, 3, 4, 8, 10), announcer (4)
- Russ Pahl - steel guitar (5, 6, 7, 12), slide guitar (7)
- Michael Rhodes - bass guitar (5, 6, 12)
- Rex Schnelle - electric guitar (7)
- Chris Stapleton - background vocals (4)
- Bryan Sutton - acoustic guitar (1, 4, 7), banjo (1, 4), mandolin (3, 10), gut string guitar (10)
- Quentin Ware - trumpet (5)
- Glenn Worf - bass guitar (7)
- Jonathan Yudkin - fiddle (6, 7, 12), mandolin (6, 7, 12), octophone (12)

Technical credits for tracks 1–4, 8–11

- Brady Barnett - digital editing
- Richard Barrow - recording assistant, overdubs
- Drew Bollman - overdubs, assistant
- Neal Cappellino - overdubs
- Tyler Moles - digital editing
- Justin Niebank - mixing
- Frank Rogers - producer
- Steve Short - assistant
- Hank Williams - mastering
- Brian "Loopy Dave" Willis - digital editing

Technical credits for tracks 5, 6, 12, 13

- Adam Ayan - mastering
- Drew Bollman - assistant
- Richard Dodd - recording
- Darrell Franklin - A&R coordination
- Mike "Frog" Griffith - production coordination
- Mark Hagen - recording, overdubs
- Dann Huff - producer
- Steve Marcantonio - recording
- Seth Morton - assistant
- Justin Niebank - mixing
- Mike Paragone - assistant
- Lowell Reynolds - assistant
- Christopher Rowe - digital assistant
- Aaron Walk - assistant

Technical credits for track 7

- Trace Adkins - producer
- Kenny Beard - producer
- Casey Beathard - producer
- Tony Castle - recording
- Mickey Jack Cones - overdubs, digital editing
- Billy Decker - mixing
- Mel Eubanks - assistant
- Rex Schnelle - overdubs
- Hank Williams - mastering

Visual

- Denise Arguijo - art production
- Kristin Barlowe - photography
- Joanna Carter - art direction
- Michelle Hall - art production
- Lee Wright Creative - graphic design

== Chart performance ==
=== Weekly charts ===
Chart (2006)	Peak position
US Billboard 200	3
US Top Country Albums (Billboard)	1

=== Year-end charts ===
Chart (2006)	Position
US Billboard 200	174
US Top Country Albums (Billboard)	34

Chart (2007)	Position
US Billboard 200	152
US Top Country Albums (Billboard)	27

== Certifications ==
Region	Certification
United States (RIAA)	Gold
