= The King's Gift =

Studio album by Trace Adkins
- Released: October 29, 2013
- Recorded: Early 2013
- Genre: Country, Christmas
- Length: 41:42
- Label: Caliburn Records
- Producer: Jon Coleman; Michael Spriggs

Trace Adkins chronology
Love Will... (2013)	The King's Gift (2013)	10 Great Songs: 20th Century Masters: The Millennium Collection (2014)

Professional ratings
Review scores
Source	Rating
Allmusic	4/5 stars

The King's Gift is the fifteenth studio album, and the first Christmas album released in 2013 by American country music artist Trace Adkins. It is his first album of Christmas music and an album of classic Christmas Carols performed in Celtic style.

== Track listing ==
No.	Title	Length
1.	"Wexford Carol"	3:55
2.	"Tannenbaum"	3:50
3.	"O' Come Emmanuel" (feat. Emma Stevens)	5:17
4.	"Away in a Manger" (feat. Emma Stevens)	3:20
5.	"I Saw Three Ships" (feat. The Chieftains and Alyth McCormack)	3:56
6.	"Silent Night" (feat. Kevin Costner and Lily Costner)	4:30
7.	"We Three Kings" (feat. Sonya Isaacs)	4:18
8.	"Carol of the Drum" (feat. Kenny Aronoff)	4:15
9.	"Oh Holy Night" (feat. The Isaacs)	4:41
10.	"What Child Is This"	3:40
Total length:		41:42

== Personnel ==
- Wayne Addleman - Weissenborn
- Trace Adkins - lead vocals
- Kenny Aronoff - drums on "Carol of the Drum"
- Spady Brannen - bass guitar
- Steve Brewster - drums, percussion
- Skip Cleavinger - tin whistle, uilleann pipes
- Jon Coleman - Hammond B-3 organ, keyboards, piano, synthesizer pads, background vocals
- Kevin Conoff - bodhrán on "I Saw Three Ships"
- Kevin Costner - vocals on "Silent Night"
- Lily Costner - vocals on "Silent Night"
- Mark Gillespie - mandolin
- David Goodman - Irish whistle, small pipes
- Becky Issacs - vocals on "Oh Holy Night"
- Ben Isaacs - vocals on "Oh Holy Night "
- Sonya Isaacs - vocals on "We Three Kings"
- Steve Mackey - bass guitar
- Paddy Moloney - penny whistle and uilleann pipes on "I Saw Three Ships"
- Triona Marshall - harp
- Alyth McCormack - vocals on "I Saw Three Ships"
- Jon Pilatzky - fiddle
- Paul Reissner - background vocals
- Deannie Richardson - percussion
- Perry Richardson - background vocals
- Michael Spriggs - bouzouki, baritone guitar, nylon string guitar
- Emma Stevens - vocals on "O' Come Emmanuel" and "Away in a Manger"
- Jeff White - acoustic guitar
- Brian Wooten - electric guitar
- Jonathan Yudkin - cello, Irish harp, mandolin, violin

== Chart performance ==
Chart (2013)	Peak position
US Billboard 200	75
US Top Country Albums (Billboard)	12
US Top Holiday Albums (Billboard)	9
US Independent Albums (Billboard)	11
