= Honky Tonk Badonkadonk =

2005 single by Trace Adkins

Single by Trace Adkins

from the album Songs About Me
- Released: October 3, 2005
- Genre: Proto-bro-country
- Length: 4:01 (album version); 3:36 (radio edit); 4:00 (video remix)
- Label: Capitol Nashville
- Songwriters: Dallas Davidson; Randy Houser; Jamey Johnson
- Producer: Dann Huff

Trace Adkins singles chronology
"Arlington" (2005)	"Honky Tonk Badonkadonk" (2005)	"Swing" (2006)

"Honky Tonk Badonkadonk" is a song written by Dallas Davidson, Randy Houser and Jamey Johnson, and recorded by American country music artist Trace Adkins. It was released in October 2005 as the third and final single from his album Songs About Me. The song was a crossover hit for Adkins, peaking at number 2 on the U.S. Hot Country Songs chart for two weeks, behind "Jesus, Take the Wheel" by Carrie Underwood, and it also reached the top 40 on both the U.S. Billboard Hot 100 and Pop 100 charts, making it his first top 40 hit on both charts. It was also certified gold for more than 500,000 musical downloads. Its ringtone also received more than 75,000 downloads.

"Honky Tonk Badonkadonk" is also the name of a European compilation built around various mixes of the song.

== Content ==
According to Jamey Johnson, who co-wrote the song with Dallas Davidson and Randy Houser, the idea for "Honky Tonk Badonkadonk" came when Johnson, Davidson, and Houser were watching a young woman dancing at a club. Houser came up with the title "honky tonk badonkadonk", in reference to the slang term "badonkadonk", which references shapely buttocks. Within an hour, the three had written the song.

== Music videos ==
A music video was also made, featuring an alternate, remixed version of the song. The video remix, along with two other remixes and a reprise of the original mix, are also featured on Adkins' 2006 album Dangerous Man. The song was used in the film Crank: High Voltage. Craig Ferguson used this song for his cold opening on the 1,000th episode of The Late Late Show with Craig Ferguson. It also featured in the fifth episode of the tenth season of the cult sci-fi show The X-Files, during a dream sequence in which Fox Mulder trips on what he thinks are magic mushrooms.

== Appearance in media ==
- The song appears on the in-game radio for Thrillville.

== Track listings ==
European CD single
No.	Title	Length
1.	"Honky Tonk Badonkadonk" (Country Club Mix)	3:43
2.	"Honky Tonk Badonkadonk" ('70s Groove Mix)	4:49
3.	"Honky Tonk Badonkadonk" (Eurofunk Mix)	3:35
4.	"Honky Tonk Badonkadonk" (Single Edit)	3:38
5.	"Honky Tonk Badonkadonk" (Edit) (No Intro/Dialogue)	3:29
6.	"Honky Tonk Badonkadonk" (Single Edit Extended)	4:04
7.	"Honky Tonk Badonkadonk"	4:00
Total length:		27:18

Honky Tonk Badonkadonk: The Remixes (US)
No.	Title	Length
1.	"Honky Tonk Badonkadonk" (Country Club Mix)	3:44
2.	"Honky Tonk Badonkadonk" ('70s Groove Mix)	4:50
3.	"Honky Tonk Badonkadonk" (Eurofunk Mix)	3:36
4.	"Honky Tonk Badonkadonk" (Jack Da House)	3:33
5.	"Honky Tonk Badonkadonk" (Playa Remix)	3:24
Total length:		19:07

== Chart performance ==
"Honky Tonk Badonkadonk" entered the Hot Country Songs chart in early 2005 at number 58 based on unsolicited airplay. The song was officially released later in that same year and debuted at number 56 on the U.S. Billboard Hot Country Songs chart for the week of October 1, 2005. It peaked at number 2 on the Hot Country Songs chart in early 2006.

=== Weekly charts ===
Chart (2005–2006)	Peak position
US Hot Country Songs (Billboard)	2
US Billboard Hot 100	30
US Billboard Pop 100	33

=== Year-end charts ===
Chart (2006)	Position
US Country Songs (Billboard)	35

== Certifications ==
Certifications for Honky Tonk Badonkadonk
Region	Certification	Certified units/sales
United States (RIAA)	3× Platinum	3,000,000^{‡}
United States (RIAA) Mastertone	Platinum	1,000,000^{*}
^{*} Sales figures based on certification alone.^{‡} Sales+streaming figures based on certification alone.
