= The Rest of Mine =

Single by Trace Adkins

from the album Big Time
- B-side: "Dreamin' Out Loud"
- Released: September 23, 1997
- Genre: Country
- Length: 3:13
- Label: Capitol Nashville
- Songwriters: Trace Adkins, Kenny Beard
- Producer: Scott Hendricks

Trace Adkins singles chronology
"I Left Something Turned On at Home" (1997)	"The Rest of Mine" (1997)	"Lonely Won't Leave Me Alone" (1998)

"The Rest of Mine" is a song co-written and recorded by American country music artist Trace Adkins. It was released in September 1997 as the first single from his album Big Time. His fifth entry on the Billboard country charts, it peaked at number 4 and number 70 on the Billboard Hot 100.

== Content ==
"The Rest of Mine" is a mid-tempo where the male narrator addresses his lover. He promises his love to her by saying "No, I can't swear I'll be here / For the rest of your life / But I swear I'll love you / For the rest of mine".

Adkins co-wrote the song with Kenny Beard. The two came up with the idea after watching the movie Phenomenon. Adkins also performed the song at his own wedding.

== Critical reception ==
Thom Owens of Allmusic cited "The Rest of Mine" as a standout track on Big Time, calling it "well-crafted contemporary country showcasing his booming baritone to fine effect."

== Chart performance ==
Chart (1997)	Peak position
Canada Country Singles (RPM)	5
US Billboard Hot 100	70
US Hot Country Songs (Billboard)	4
