= Every Light in the House =

Single by Trace Adkins

from the album Dreamin' Out Loud
- B-side: "If I Fall (You're Goin' with Me)"
- Released: August 20, 1996
- Genre: Country
- Length: 2:59
- Label: Capitol Nashville
- Songwriter: Kent Robbins
- Producer: Scott Hendricks

Trace Adkins singles chronology
"There's a Girl in Texas" (1996)	"Every Light in the House" (1996)	"(This Ain't) No Thinkin' Thing" (1997)

Music video
- "Every Light in the House" at CMT.com

"Every Light in the House" is a song written by Kent Robbins and recorded by American country music artist Trace Adkins. It was released in August 1996 as the second single from his debut album Dreamin' Out Loud. It was his first Top 5 single on the Hot Country Singles & Tracks (now Hot Country Songs) chart, where it peaked at #3.

== Content ==
The song is a mid-tempo ballad mostly accompanied by piano and fiddle in which the narrator has recently split from his wife. He turns every light on in the house and keeps them on for her in case she wants to return to his side.

== Critical reception ==
Deborah Evans Price, of Billboard magazine reviewed the song favorably, saying that "Adkins' deep, powerful voice does justice to the yearning in this lyric about a man who has left the lights on waiting for his lover to return." Rick Cohoon of AllMusic gave the song a favorable review, calling it a "creative approach to the age-old 'goodbye, I miss you' song." He commended Adkins' voice for "communicat[ing] pain so well" despite the singer's stature, although he considered some of the similes forced (e.g. "the backyard's bright as the crack of dawn").

== Music video ==
The music video for this song is in black-and-white, and begins with Adkins sitting on the porch of a house with his dog after his woman left home. He then gets off the porch, and he and some workers get to work on a power generator. Scenes also feature him singing inside of the same house which also featured an alternative sub chorus "Drinkin' Bush Light til the crack of dawn" whilst a slew of empty Busch cans can be seen next to the generator, ultimately this scene and lyric was scrubbed and the original was used.

== Chart performance ==
"Every Light in the House" debuted at number 72 on the Hot Country Singles & Tracks chart dated August 24, 1996. It charted for 21 weeks on that chart, and peaked at number 3 on the country chart dated December 14, 1996, giving Adkins the first Top 5 single of his career. In addition, it peaked at number 78 on the Billboard Hot 100, also marking his first entry on that chart.

Chart (1996)	Peak position
Canada Country Singles (RPM)	10
US Billboard Hot 100	78
US Hot Country Songs (Billboard)	3

== Certifications ==
Certifications for Every Light in the House
Region	Certification	Certified units/sales
United States (RIAA)	Gold	500,000^{‡}
^{‡} Sales+streaming figures based on certification alone.

== Parodies ==
On his 1998 album Did I Shave My Back for This?, country parodist Cledus T. Judd parodied the song as "Every Light in the House Is Blown". Trace Adkins is featured in the music video when the song begins and after it ends.
