= Rough & Ready =

Single by Trace Adkins

from the album Comin' On Strong
- Released: April 12, 2004
- Genre: Country
- Length: 3:08
- Label: Capitol Nashville
- Songwriters: Blair Mackichan; Brian Gene White; Craig Wiseman
- Producer: Trey Bruce

Trace Adkins singles chronology
"Hot Mama" (2003)	"Rough & Ready" (2004)	"Songs About Me" (2004)

"Rough & Ready" is a song written by Blair Mackichan, Brian Gene White and Craig Wiseman, and recorded by American country music artist Trace Adkins. It was released in April 2004 as the second and final single from his album Comin' On Strong. Although the song was not a Top 10 hit, it was certified gold by the Recording Industry Association of America (RIAA).

== Content ==
The male narrator professes his masculinity in the song. In the opening, session guitarist J. T. Corenflos was asked by producer Trey Bruce to "come up with some funky, country kind of lick to start this song", so he improvised one.

== Critical reception ==
Deborah Evans Price, of Billboard magazine reviewed the song favorably, saying that it "fits Adkins' larger-than-life personality and Louisiana roughneck past." She says that Adkins "launches into the rapid-fire lyrics with gusto" and that he "goes for broke with a terrific vocal performance - and the spoken asides he tosses into the mix are hilarious."

== Music video ==
The music video was directed by Michael Salomon, and features NASCAR driver Dale Earnhardt Jr. and actress Deena Dill. It also features Jennifer Lee Wiggins.

== Chart performance ==
"Rough & Ready" debuted at number 56 on the U.S. Billboard Hot Country Songs for the week of April 17, 2004.

Chart (2004)	Peak position
US Hot Country Songs (Billboard)	13
US Billboard Hot 100	75

=== Year-end charts ===
Chart (2004)	Position
US Country Songs (Billboard)	41
