= Songs About Me (song) =

Single by Trace Adkins

from the album Songs About Me
- Released: December 13, 2004
- Recorded: 2004
- Genre: Country
- Length: 3:24
- Label: Capitol Nashville
- Songwriters: Shaye Smith; Ed Hill
- Producer: Scott Hendricks

Trace Adkins singles chronology
"Rough & Ready" (2004)	"Songs About Me" (2004)	"Arlington" (2005)

"Songs About Me" is a song written by Shaye Smith and Ed Hill and recorded by American country music artist Trace Adkins. It was released in December 2004 as the first single and title track from Adkin's album of the same name. This song peaked at number 2 on the U.S. Billboard Hot Country Songs chart.

== Content ==
This song reflects the problems of discrimination that country music listeners face. In the song, the narrator is on an early morning flight when he meets a man who asks him what he does for a living upon seeing the narrator's guitar. He says he sings "country music mixed with a little rock and a little blues", something that the man has never enjoyed. Later, the narrator asks him to attend a country music concert, to which he says he will attempt to do, even though "[he'll] be kinda busy". Later, upon watching the narrator perform at the concert, the man finds that the songs relate to him as well ("Songs about me and who I am / Songs about loving and living / And goodhearted women, family, and God").

== Music video ==
The music video was directed by Michael Salomon. In it, Adkins meets a man on a plane, they talk, then he offers the young man tickets to one of his shows. The man expresses a dislike of country music, saying he doesn't really identify with the songs or style of music. Adkins explains that he just sings about his life, giving us the title "Songs About Me". The man later shows up at the concert and is surprised that he enjoys it and identifies with the subjects of the songs. It was filmed in front of a live audience at Nashville's Wildhorse Saloon, and at the Nashville International Airport.

== Chart performance ==
"Songs About Me" peaked at number 2 on the US Billboard Hot Country Songs for the week of June 4, 2005 in the United States, and went to number 15 in Canada. The week that the song peaked, the top three positions on the country chart were all occupied by artists from Capitol Nashville, the label to which Adkins was signed at the time, making it the third time that artists from the same label accomplished this feat. The song also reached number 59 on the Billboard Hot 100, and at number 27 for year end in 2005.

Chart (2004–2005)	Peak position
US Hot Country Songs (Billboard)	2
US Billboard Hot 100	59

=== Year-end charts ===
Chart (2005)	Position
US Country Songs (Billboard)	27

== Certifications ==
Certifications for Songs About Me
Region	Certification	Certified units/sales
United States (RIAA)	Gold	500,000^{‡}
^{‡} Sales+streaming figures based on certification alone.
