= Lonely Won't Leave Me Alone (Trace Adkins song) =

Single by Trace Adkins

from the album Big Time
- B-side: "Wayfaring Stranger"
- Released: February 24, 1998
- Recorded: 1997
- Genre: Country
- Length: 3:08 (album version)
- Label: Capitol Nashville
- Songwriters: Jody Alan Sweet, Mary Danna
- Producer: Scott Hendricks

Trace Adkins singles chronology
"The Rest of Mine" (1997)	"Lonely Won't Leave Me Alone" (1998)	"Big Time" (1998)

"Lonely Won't Leave Me Alone" is a song written by Jody Alan Sweet and Mary Danna and recorded by American country music artist Trace Adkins. It was released in February 1998 the second single from his album Big Time, as well as his sixth single overall.

== Music video ==
The music video was directed by Michael Merriman, and features Adkins walking around the city of Atlanta seeing the memory of his former lover everywhere he goes, including seeing her as a giant. The trick is, every time he sees her, she disappears completely from his view. Among the venues identifiable in the video are a MARTA station, the Fox Theatre and the Georgia state capitol. It was filmed entirely using a green-screen in Nashville. Adkins himself has called it "the worst and most uncomfortable video [he's] ever done" and has often referred to it as his least favorite video.

== Chart performance ==
This song peaked at number 11 on the Hot Country Songs chart in the U.S. and at number 10 on Canada's RPM Country Tracks chart.

Chart (1998)	Peak position
Canada Country Singles (RPM)	10
US Bubbling Under Hot 100 (Billboard)	12
US Hot Country Songs (Billboard)	11

=== Year-end charts ===
Chart (1998)	Position
Canada Country Tracks (RPM)	65
US Country Songs (Billboard)	72
