= Love Will... =

Love Will

Studio album by Trace Adkins
- Released: May 14, 2013
- Genre: Country
- Length: 41:38
- Label: Show Dog-Universal Music
- Producers: Mickey Jack Cones (tracks 1–8); Kenny Beard (tracks 2–8); Mark Wright (tracks 2, 4, 5); Frank Rogers (tracks 9–11); Tony Brown (track 1)

Trace Adkins chronology
Proud to Be Here (2011)	Love Will (2013)	The King's Gift (2013)

Singles from Love Will...
- 1. "Watch the World End" Released: May 13, 2013

Professional ratings
Review scores
Source	Rating
Allmusic	3.5/5 stars
Country Weekly	B+
Roughstock	4.5/5 stars
Taste of Country	4/5 stars

Love Will... is the fourteenth studio album by American country music artist Trace Adkins. It was released on May 14, 2013, by Show Dog-Universal Music. The album features collaborations with Colbie Caillat, Exile and the Harlem Gospel Choir.

== Track listing ==
No.	Title	Writer(s)	Length
1.	"When I Stop Loving You"	Marty Brown, Even Stevens	3:21
2.	"So What If I Do"	Ward Davis, Rick Huckaby, Matt Nolan	3:25
3.	"Come See Me"	Kenny Beard, Sonny LeMaire, J.P. Pennington	2:58
4.	"Right Now"	Beard, Aly Cutter, Nolan	3:10
5.	"Every One of You"	Steve Bogard, Kyle Jacobs, Billy Montana, Phil O'Donnell	3:15
6.	"The Altar of Your Love"	Trace Adkins, Beard, Monty Criswell	3:32
7.	"Kiss You All Over" (featuring Exile)	Mike Chapman, Nicky Chinn	5:13
8.	"If the Sun Comes Up"	Ray Scott, George Teren	4:30
9.	"Say No to a Woman"	Lee Thomas Miller, Jimmy Yeary	3:39
10.	"Watch the World End" (featuring Colbie Caillat)	Brett Eldredge, Jeremy Spillman	4:39
11.	"Love Will" (featuring the Harlem Gospel Choir)	Tim James, Chris Stapleton	3:56
Total length:			41:38

== Personnel ==
- Trace Adkins - lead vocals
- David Angell - violin
- The Beagles - background vocals
- Mike Brignardello - bass guitar
- Pat Buchanan - electric guitar
- Colbie Caillat - vocals on "Watch The World End"
- Jimmy Carter - bass guitar
- Wei Tsun Chung - violin
- Mickey Jack Cones - acoustic guitar, electric guitar, percussion, background vocals
- J.T. Corenflos - electric guitar
- Chad Cromwell - drums
- Aly Cutter - background vocals
- Eric Darken - percussion
- Shawn Fichter - drums
- Shannon Forrest - drums
- Steve Goetzman - drums on "Kiss You All Over"
- Marlon Hargis - keyboards on "Kiss You All Over"
- Harlem Gospel Choir - background vocals on "Love Will"
- Tony Harrell - keyboards
- Aubrey Haynie - fiddle, mandolin
- Wes Hightower - background vocals
- Mark Hill - bass guitar
- Jim Hoke - saxophone
- John Barlow Jarvis - piano
- Mike Johnson - pedal steel guitar
- Charlie Judge - keyboards
- Troy Lancaster - electric guitar
- Sonny LeMaire - bass guitar on "Kiss You All Over"
- Brent Mason - electric guitar
- Gordon Mote - Hammond B-3 organ, piano
- Steve Nathan - Hammond B-3 organ
- Russ Pahl - pedal steel guitar
- J.P. Pennington - electric guitar and background vocals on "Kiss You All Over"
- Charles "Pevy" Pevahouse - acoustic guitar
- Sari Reist - cello
- Michael Rhodes - bass guitar
- Frank Rogers - baritone guitar, electric guitar
- Scotty Sanders - pedal steel guitar
- Pam Sixfin - violin
- Les Taylor - acoustic guitar and background vocals on "Kiss You All Over"
- Ilya Toshinsky - acoustic guitar
- Kris Wilkinson - string arrangements, viola
- John Willis - acoustic guitar
- Lonnie Wilson - drums

== Chart performance ==
=== Weekly charts ===
Chart (2013)	Peak position
US Billboard 200	14
US Top Country Albums (Billboard)	6

=== Year-end charts ===
Chart (2013)	Position
US Top Country Albums (Billboard)	65

=== Singles ===
Year	Single	Peak positions
Year	Single	US Country Airplay
2013	"Watch the World End"	57
