= Arlington (song) =

Single by Trace Adkins

from the album Songs About Me
- Released: June 11, 2005
- Genre: Country
- Length: 4:07 (album version); 3:55 (radio edit)
- Label: Capitol Nashville
- Songwriters: Jeremy Spillman, Dave Turnbull
- Producer: Scott Hendricks

Trace Adkins singles chronology
"Songs About Me" (2004)	"Arlington" (2005)	"Honky Tonk Badonkadonk" (2005)

"Arlington" is a song written by Jeremy Spillman and Dave Turnbull and recorded by American country music artist Trace Adkins. It was released in June 2005 as the second single from Adkin's album Songs About Me. The song reached number 16 on the Billboard Hot Country Singles & Tracks chart.

== Content ==
It is sung from the viewpoint of a soldier, killed in battle and buried at Arlington National Cemetery. It was inspired by United States Marine Corps Corporal Patrick Nixon, who died in battle in 2003. After meeting Nixon's father, Turnbull was inspired to write the song.

Adkins said that "This is not a war song, and it has nothing to do with politics. This is a true story."

== Critical reception ==
Deborah Evans Price of Billboard gave the song a positive review, calling it a "hauntingly beautiful song about sacrifice, honor, and the cost of freedom, and it leaves a lasting impression no matter which way your political views lean."

== Chart performance ==
"Arlington" reached a peak of number 16 on the Hot Country Songs chart in August 2005. The song fell from this peak after Adkins withdrew it, due to complaints from families of service members.

Chart (2005)	Peak position
US Hot Country Songs (Billboard)	16
US Billboard Bubbling Under Hot 100	2
