= I Left Something Turned On at Home =

Single by Trace Adkins

from the album Dreamin' Out Loud
- B-side: "I Can Only Love You Like a Man"
- Released: April 21, 1997
- Genre: Country
- Length: 3:07
- Label: Capitol Nashville
- Songwriters: Billy Lawson; John Schweers
- Producer: Scott Hendricks

Trace Adkins singles chronology
"(This Ain't) No Thinkin' Thing" (1997)	"I Left Something Turned On at Home" (1997)	"The Rest of Mine" (1997)

"I Left Something Turned On at Home" is a song written by Billy Lawson and John Schweers and recorded by American country music singer Trace Adkins. It was released in April 1997 as the fourth and final single from his debut album Dreamin' Out Loud. The song became his third Top 10 hit on the Hot Country Singles & Tracks (now Hot Country Songs) chart by reaching number 2 for two weeks, only behind "Carrying Your Love with Me" by George Strait. It also became his second number 1 single on the Canadian RPM country chart.

== Content ==
The song is up-tempo accompanied largely by electric guitar. It is based on a double entendre. The male narrator is at a bar, telling his companions that he has to leave because he "left something turned on at home". He then explains in the chorus that what he left "turned on" was not an appliance, but rather his sexually aroused female partner.

== Critical reception ==
Rick Cohoon of Allmusic gave the song a favorable review. He stated that "Lawson and Schweers [the songwriters] gave a whole new meaning to an age-old expression, and that's what good songwriting is." Deborah Evans Price, of Billboard magazine reviewed the song favorably, calling it an "energetic exercise in double-entendres." and that the song features "tasty guitar and fiddle touches, but the main selling point is Adkins' tongue-in-cheek vocal performance."

== Chart positions ==
"I Left Something Turned On at Home" debuted at number 73 on the U.S. Billboard Hot Country Singles & Tracks for the week of April 26, 1997.

Chart (1997)	Peak position
Canada Country Singles (RPM)	1
US Hot Country Songs (Billboard)	2

=== Year-end charts ===
Chart (1997)	Position
Canada Country Tracks (RPM)	28
US Country Songs (Billboard)	10
