= Hot Mama =

Single by Trace Adkins

from the album Comin' On Strong
- Released: September 22, 2003
- Genre: Country
- Length: 3:20
- Label: Capitol Nashville
- Songwriters: Tom Shapiro, Casey Beathard
- Producer: Scott Hendricks

Trace Adkins singles chronology
"Then They Do" (2003)	"Hot Mama" (2003)	"Rough & Ready" (2004)

"Hot Mama" is a song written by Tom Shapiro and Casey Beathard, and recorded by American country music singer Trace Adkins. It was released in September 2003 as the lead single from his album Comin' On Strong. The song peaked at number 5 on the U.S. Billboard Hot Country Singles & Tracks (now Hot Country Songs) chart, giving Adkins his seventh Top 10 single on that chart. It also peaked at number 51 on the U.S. Billboard Hot 100.

== Content ==
In "Hot Mama," the male narrator addresses his lover, telling her that he enjoys her body the way that it is.

The song was featured in the King of the Hill episode, "The Redneck on Rainey Street", in which Adkins voices the character Elvin Mackelston.

== Critical reception ==
Deborah Evans Price, of Billboard magazine reviewed the song favorably, calling a "thumpin' ode to appreciation of one's good ole gal, particularly when sleeping kids provide opportunity." She goes on to say that Adkins "wraps his muscular baritone around a bold production and a lyric heavy on domestic-life testosterone." William Ruhlmann of Allmusic also gave the song a favorable review, saying that it "has a frisky appeal and, with its erotically charged tag line, 'You wanna?' a novelty quality[.]"

=== Kristi Noem controversy ===
On January 28, 2025, South Dakota Governor and homeland secretary, Kristi Noem, received backlash after walking out for DHS remarks to the Trace Adkins' song as a result of allegations on the campaign's attempt to objectify women, referring to the incident as sexist.

== Music video ==
The music video was directed by Michael Salomon, and premiered in late 2003. It co-stars model Lisa Ligon. Compared to the song alone, this video appears to be more risqué due to Ligon strip teases for Adkins in one point.

== Chart performance ==
"Hot Mama" debuted at number 53 on the U.S. Billboard Hot Country Songs for the week of September 27, 2003.

Chart (2003–2004)	Peak position
US Hot Country Songs (Billboard)	5
US Billboard Hot 100	51

=== Year-end charts ===
Chart (2004)	Position
US Country Songs (Billboard)	34

== See also ==
- Physical attractiveness
- MILF
