= Ladies Love Country Boys =

Single by Trace Adkins

from the album Dangerous Man
- Released: September 18, 2006
- Recorded: 2006
- Genre: Country
- Length: 3:42
- Label: Capitol Nashville
- Songwriters: Jamey Johnson; George Teren; Rivers Rutherford
- Producer: Frank Rogers

Trace Adkins singles chronology
"Swing" (2006)	"Ladies Love Country Boys" (2006)	"I Wanna Feel Something" (2007)

"Ladies Love Country Boys" is a song written by Jamey Johnson, Rivers Rutherford and George Teren, and recorded by American country music singer Trace Adkins. It was released in September 18, 2006 as the second single from his album Dangerous Man. It reached the top of the Billboard Hot Country Songs chart and became Adkins' second Number One single and his first since "(This Ain't) No Thinkin' Thing" in 1997.

== Music video ==
The music video was directed by Michael Salomon and premiered on CMT on November 9, 2006 during CMT's Top 20 Countdown.

== Chart performance ==
Chart (2006–2007)	Peak position
US Hot Country Songs (Billboard)	1
US Billboard Hot 100	61

=== Year-end charts ===
Chart (2007)	Position
US Country Songs (Billboard)	25

== Certifications ==
Region	Certification	Certified units/sales
United States (RIAA)	Platinum	1,000,000^{‡}
^{‡} Sales+streaming figures based on certification alone.
