= Swing (Trace Adkins song) =

Single by Trace Adkins

from the album Dangerous Man
- Released: May 15, 2006
- Genre: Country
- Length: 3:38
- Label: Capitol Nashville
- Songwriters: Chris Stapleton, Frank Rogers
- Producer: Frank Rogers

Trace Adkins singles chronology
"Honky Tonk Badonkadonk" (2005)	"Swing" (2006)	"Ladies Love Country Boys" (2006)

"Swing" is a song written by Chris Stapleton and Frank Rogers, and recorded by American country music artist Trace Adkins. It was released in May 2006 as the first single from his album Dangerous Man.

== Content ==
The song uses a typical baseball batting practice to set up a woman's night at a tavern, and several men's attempts to pick her up. The first man "strikes out" using cheap pick-up lines, such as "what's your sign?". The second lies about his background (claiming he attended Harvard University as a pre-med major) and reaches first but then tells her he quit because it was too hard, thus getting "picked off". Finally, the third man "hits a home run" successfully gaining the woman's interest and leaves the bar with her.

== Critical reception ==
Allmusic reviewed "Swing" as "glossy and anthemic." Kevin John Coyne of Country Universe called the song "a train wreck."

== Music video ==
The music video was directed by Michael Salomon and premiered in June 2006. The video depicts a baseball team's practice. The team can't get one batter to hit against the pitcher, who is a self-centered egomaniac and thinks he is God's gift to women. The crowd of fans starts to leave when the groundskeeper (Trace Adkins) steps up to the plate and asks for a pitch. The pitcher is more than happy to oblige, as he had just managed to strike out the whole team. The groundskeeper is successful hitting a home run on a fastball and runs the bases, all the time making fun of the pitch. When crossing home, the girl jumps into his arms.

== Chart performance ==
The song debuted at number 47 on the U.S. Billboard Hot Country Songs chart for the week of May 13, 2006.

Chart (2006)	Peak position
US Hot Country Songs (Billboard)	20
US Billboard Hot 100	76
US Billboard Pop 100	75

== Certifications ==
Certifications for Swing
Region	Certification	Certified units/sales
United States (RIAA)	Gold	500,000^{‡}
^{‡} Sales+streaming figures based on certification alone.
