= Proud to Be Here =

Studio album by Trace Adkins
- Released: August 2, 2011
- Genre: Country
- Length: 35:59; 50:18 (deluxe edition)
- Label: Show Dog-Universal Music
- Producers: Kenny Beard (all tracks except 5); Mark Wright (all tracks except 5); Michael Knox (track 5)

Trace Adkins chronology
Cowboy's Back in Town (2010)	Proud to Be Here (2011)	Love Will... (2013)

Singles from Proud to Be Here
- 1. "Just Fishin'" Released: March 21, 2011; 2. "Million Dollar View" Released: October 31, 2011

Professional ratings
Review scores
Source	Rating
AllMusic	3.5/5 stars

Proud to Be Here is the thirteenth studio album by American country music artist Trace Adkins. It was released on August 2, 2011, by Show Dog-Universal Music. A deluxe edition with four additional tracks was also released, including a duet with Blake Shelton titled "If I Was a Woman".

== Track listing ==
No.	Title	Writer(s)	Length
1.	"Proud to Be Here"	Chris Wallin, Aaron Barker, Ira Dean	3:44
2.	"Million Dollar View"	David Lee Murphy, George Teren	3:21
3.	"Days Like This"	Trace Adkins, Casey Beathard, Kenny Beard	4:14
4.	"That's What You Get"	Rivers Rutherford, Aly Cutter, Beard	3:07
5.	"Just Fishin'"	Beathard, Monty Criswell, Ed Hill	3:30
6.	"It's a Woman Thang"	Craig Wiseman, Jim Collins	3:43
7.	"Love Buzz"	Beathard, Kendell Marvel	3:42
8.	"It's Who You Know"	Rutherford, Wendell Mobley, Beard	3:26
9.	"Poor Folks"	Ray Scott, Phillip Moore	3:41
10.	"Always Gonna Be That Way"	Dallas Davidson, Chris Tompkins	3:25
Total length:			35:59

Deluxe Edition
No.	Title	Writer(s)	Length
11.	"Damn You Bubba"	Wallin, Bruce Wallace	3:49
12.	"More of Us"	Beathard, Phil O'Donnell	3:32
13.	"If I Was a Woman" (featuring Blake Shelton)	Adkins, Sherrié Austin, Jeff Bates, Beard	3:14
14.	"Semper Fi"	Adkins, Beard, Criswell	3:48

Target Deluxe Edition
No.	Title	Writer(s)	Length
15.	"How Long" (Live)	Paul Carrack	6:11
16.	"One In a Million" (Live)	Sam Dees	8:04

== Personnel ==
- Trace Adkins - lead vocals
- Robert Bailey Jr. - background vocals
- Kenny Beard - background vocals
- Mike Brignardello - bass guitar
- Jim "Moose" Brown - keyboards
- Pat Buchanan - electric guitar
- Jimmy Carter - bass guitar
- Jon Coleman - synthesizer
- Perry Coleman - background vocals
- Mickey Jack Cones - background vocals
- J.T. Corenflos - electric guitar
- Aly Cutter - background vocals
- Eric Darken - percussion
- Shelly Fairchild - background vocals
- Shawn Fichter - drums
- Jimmy Fortune - background vocals
- Mark Gillespie - acoustic guitar
- Tony Harrell - Hammond B-3 organ, keyboards, piano
- Aubrey Haynie - fiddle, mandolin
- Wes Hightower - background vocals
- Jim Hoke - harmonica
- Troy Lancaster - electric guitar
- Greg Morrow - drums
- Russ Pahl - pedal steel guitar
- Charles "Pevy" Pevahouse - acoustic guitar
- Danny Rader - acoustic guitar
- Rich Redmond - percussion
- Paul Reissner - fiddle
- Scotty Sanders - dobro, pedal steel guitar
- Adam Shoenfeld - electric guitar
- Lisa Torres - background vocals
- Ilya Toshinsky - acoustic guitar
- John Willis - acoustic guitar
- Brian Wooten - electric guitar

== Charts ==
=== Weekly charts ===
Chart (2011)	Peak position
US Billboard 200	3
US Top Country Albums (Billboard)	2

=== Year-end charts ===
Chart (2011)	Position
US Top Country Albums (Billboard)	51
Chart (2012)	Position
US Top Country Albums (Billboard)	75

=== Singles ===
Year	Single	Peak chart positions	
Year	Single	US Country	US
2011	"Just Fishin'"	6	61
2011	"Million Dollar View"	38	—
"—" denotes releases that did not chart
