= More... (Trace Adkins album) =

More…

Studio album by Trace Adkins
- Released: November 2, 1999
- Genre: Country
- Length: 42:00
- Label: Capitol Nashville
- Producer: Trey Bruce: "Don't Lie" produced by Paul Worley; "All Hat, No Cattle" produced by Ray Benson

Trace Adkins chronology
Big Time (1997)	More… (1999)	Chrome (2001)

Singles from More…
- 1. "Don't Lie" Released: September 18, 1999; 2. "More" Released: January 24, 2000; 3. "I'm Gonna Love You Anyway" Released: July 29, 2000

Professional ratings
Review scores
Source	Rating
Allmusic	4/5 stars

More... is the third studio album by American country music artist Trace Adkins. It was released on November 2, 1999, on Capitol Nashville. It features the singles "Don't Lie", "More", and "I'm Gonna Love You Anyway", which respectively reached No. 27, No. 10, and No. 36 on the Hot Country Songs charts. It was also the only album of his career not to achieve a RIAA certification – Trey Bruce produced all but two of the album's tracks. "Don't Lie" was produced by Paul Worley, while "All Hat, No Cattle" was produced by Ray Benson of Asleep at the Wheel.

The album's release date was advanced due to initial radio demand for "Don't Lie".

== Track listing ==
No.	Title	Writer(s)	Length
1.	"More"	Del Gray, Thom McHugh	3:05
2.	"I'm Gonna Love You Anyway"	Stacy Dean Campbell, Dean Miller	3:00
3.	"She's Still There"	Tim Johnson, Mark D. Sanders	4:09
4.	"Someday"	Darrell Scott	3:35
5.	"Can I Want Your Love"	Jive Jones, Stephony Smith, Aimee Mayo	3:30
6.	"Don't Lie"	Chet Biggers, Frank Rogers	4:03
7.	"Working Man's Wage"	Leslie Satcher, Wynn Varble	3:16
8.	"The Night He Can't Remember"	Sarah Majors, Trace Adkins, Kenny Beard	3:53
9.	"Everything Takes Me Back"	Casey Beathard, Michael P. Heeney, Michael White	3:54
10.	"I Can Dig It"	Jim Rushing, Monty Criswell	2:52
11.	"All Hat, No Cattle"	Tommy Conners, Roger Brown	3:03
12.	"Every Other Friday at Five"	Steven Dale Jones	3:40
Total length:			42:00

== Personnel ==
Adapted from liner notes.

- Trace Adkins - lead vocals
- Ray Benson - acoustic guitar (track 11), background vocals (track 11)
- Chris Booher - piano (track 11)
- Pat Buchanan - electric guitar solo (track 3), slide guitar (track 4)
- Cindy Cashdollar - steel guitar (track 11)
- Joe Chemay - bass guitar (track 6)
- J.T. Corenflos - electric guitar, gut string guitar (track 12)
- Eric Darken - percussion (tracks 3, 4, 9, 12)
- Floyd Domino - piano (track 11)
- Michael Francis - saxophone (track 11)
- Larry Franklin - fiddle (track 6)
- Johnny Gimble - fiddle (track 11)
- Rob Hajacos - fiddle
- Tony Harrell - B-3 organ, piano, keyboards, Wurlitzer (track 2)
- Wes Hightower - background vocals (all tracks except 11)
- Steve Hinson - steel guitar, lap steel guitar
- John Hobbs - B-3 organ (track 6), piano (track 6), synthesizer (track 6)
- Troy Johnson - background vocals (track 6)
- Liana Manis - background vocals (tracks 1, 3, 4, 7, 8, 12)
- Brent Mason - electric guitar (track 2)
- David Earl Miller - bass guitar (track 11), background vocals (track 11)
- Greg Morrow - drums
- Alison Prestwood - bass guitar (tracks 2, 8)
- Jason Roberts - fiddle (track 11), electric guitar (track 11)
- David Sanger - drums (track 11)
- Brian D. Siewert - synthesizer (tracks 4, 7)
- Michael Spriggs - acoustic guitar
- Glenn Worf - bass guitar
- Paul Worley - acoustic guitar (track 6)
- Curtis Wright - background vocals (tracks 2, 5, 9, 10)
- Jonathan Yudkin - fiddle (tracks 8, 9, 10), fiddle solo (track 4), mandolin (track 7)

Strings performed by the Siewert String Thing, arranged and conducted by Brian D. Siewert.

== Chart performance ==
=== Album ===
Chart (1999)	Peak position
U.S. Billboard Top Country Albums	9
U.S. Billboard 200	82

=== Singles ===
Year	Single	Peak chart positions		
Year	Single	US Country	US	CAN Country
1999	"Don't Lie"	27	119	45
2000	"More"	10	65	4
2000	"I'm Gonna Love You Anyway"	36	—	*
"—" denotes releases that did not chart * denotes unknown peak positions
