= (This Ain't) No Thinkin' Thing =

Single by Trace Adkins

from the album Dreamin' Out Loud
- B-side: "634-5789 (Soulsville, U.S.A.)"
- Released: January 21, 1997
- Recorded: January 1996
- Genre: Country
- Length: 4:01
- Label: Capitol Nashville
- Songwriters: Tim Nichols; Mark D. Sanders
- Producer: Scott Hendricks

Trace Adkins singles chronology
"Every Light in the House" (1996)	"(This Ain't) No Thinkin' Thing" (1997)	"I Left Something Turned On at Home" (1997)

"(This Ain't) No Thinkin' Thing" is a song written by Tim Nichols and Mark D. Sanders and recorded by American country music singer Trace Adkins. It was released in January 1997 as the third single from his debut album Dreamin' Out Loud. It reached the top of the Billboard Hot Country Singles & Tracks chart, marking his first Number One single.

== Content ==
"(This Ain't) No Thinkin' Thing" is in the key of A minor, with a vocal range from C4 to E5. The verses use a pattern of G-F-C three times, followed by an F and E chord for one bar each. The refrain uses a pattern of Am-F-G-Am twice, followed by C, G, F and E and another Am-F-G-Am progression. The solos between verses are eight bars long, each based on a pair of Am-F-G-Am progressions. Lyrically, the song reflects on the complexity of understanding love and romance.

== Critical reception ==
Kevin John Coyne of Country Universe rated the song "B+", praising Adkins's baritone singing voice and the use of steel guitar.

== Music video ==
The music video for this song features Adkins singing the song with his band at a concert, as well as him performing the song beneath a sunset orange backdrop, with an acoustic guitar. This video was directed by Michael Merriman.

== Chart performance ==
This song debuted at number 44 on the Hot Country Singles & Tracks chart dated January 25, 1997. Having charted for 20 weeks on that chart, it also became his first Number One single on the country chart dated April 5, 1997. It would remain his only Number One hit until ten years later, when he topped the country charts again with "Ladies Love Country Boys."

Chart (1997)	Peak position
Canada Country Singles (RPM)	1
US Hot Country Songs (Billboard)	1

=== Year-end charts ===
Chart (1997)	Position
US Country Songs (Billboard)	7
