= Trace Adkins =

American country singer and actor (born 1962)

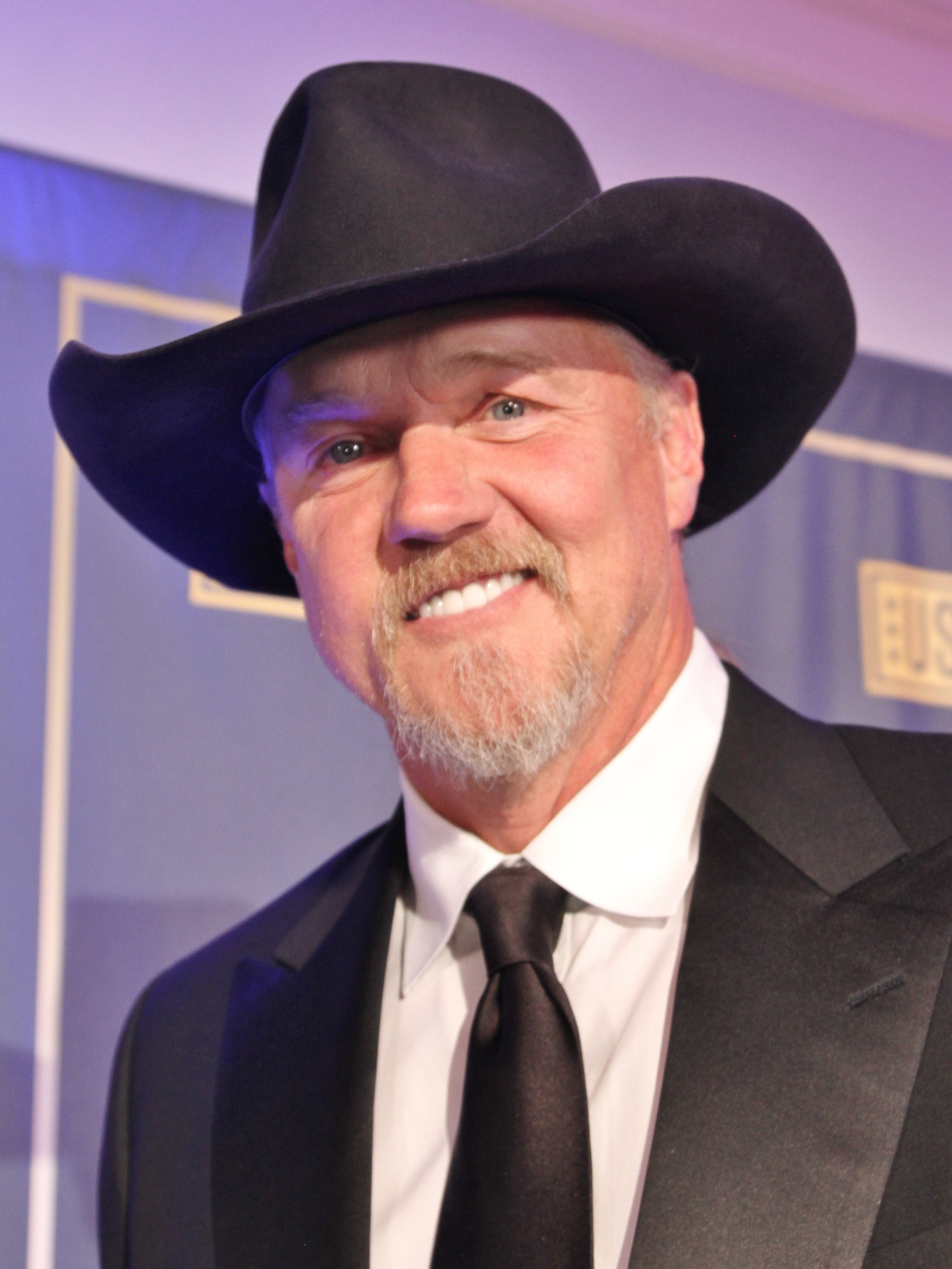
- Adkins in 2016

Background information
- Born: Tracy Darrell Adkins; January 13, 1962 (age 64); Sarepta, Louisiana, U.S.
- Origin: Springhill, Louisiana, U.S.
- Genre: Country
- Occupations: Singer; actor
- Instruments: Vocals; guitar
- Years active: 1996–present
- Labels: Capitol Nashville; Show Dog-Universal; Wheelhouse; Verge
- Website: traceadkins.com

Tracy Darrell Adkins (born January 13, 1962) known professionally as Trace Adkins, is an American country music singer and actor. Adkins made his debut in 1996 with the album Dreamin' Out Loud, released on Capitol Records Nashville. Since then, he has released 10 more studio albums and two greatest hits compilations. In addition, Adkins has charted more than 20 singles on the Billboard country music charts, including the number-one hits "(This Ain't) No Thinkin' Thing", "Ladies Love Country Boys", and "You're Gonna Miss This", which peaked in 1997, 2007, and 2008, respectively.

"I Left Something Turned on at Home" went to number one on Canada's country chart. At least six of his studio albums have received gold or platinum certification in the United States; his highest-selling to date is 2005's Songs About Me, which has been certified double multiplatinum for shipping two million copies. Adkins is widely known for his distinctive bass-baritone singing and speaking voice.

He has also made several appearances on television, including as a panelist on the game shows Hollywood Squares and Pyramid, as a 2008 finalist and as the 2013 winner on The Celebrity Apprentice, as the voice for recurring character Elvin on King of the Hill, and the main role of Albie Roman on Monarch, as well as in television commercial voice-overs for KFC and Firestone.

Also, Adkins has written an autobiography titled A Personal Stand: Observations and Opinions from a Free-Thinking Roughneck, which was released in late 2007. He has appeared in numerous films, including The Lincoln Lawyer, Moms' Night Out, Old Henry and I Can Only Imagine.

== Early life and education ==
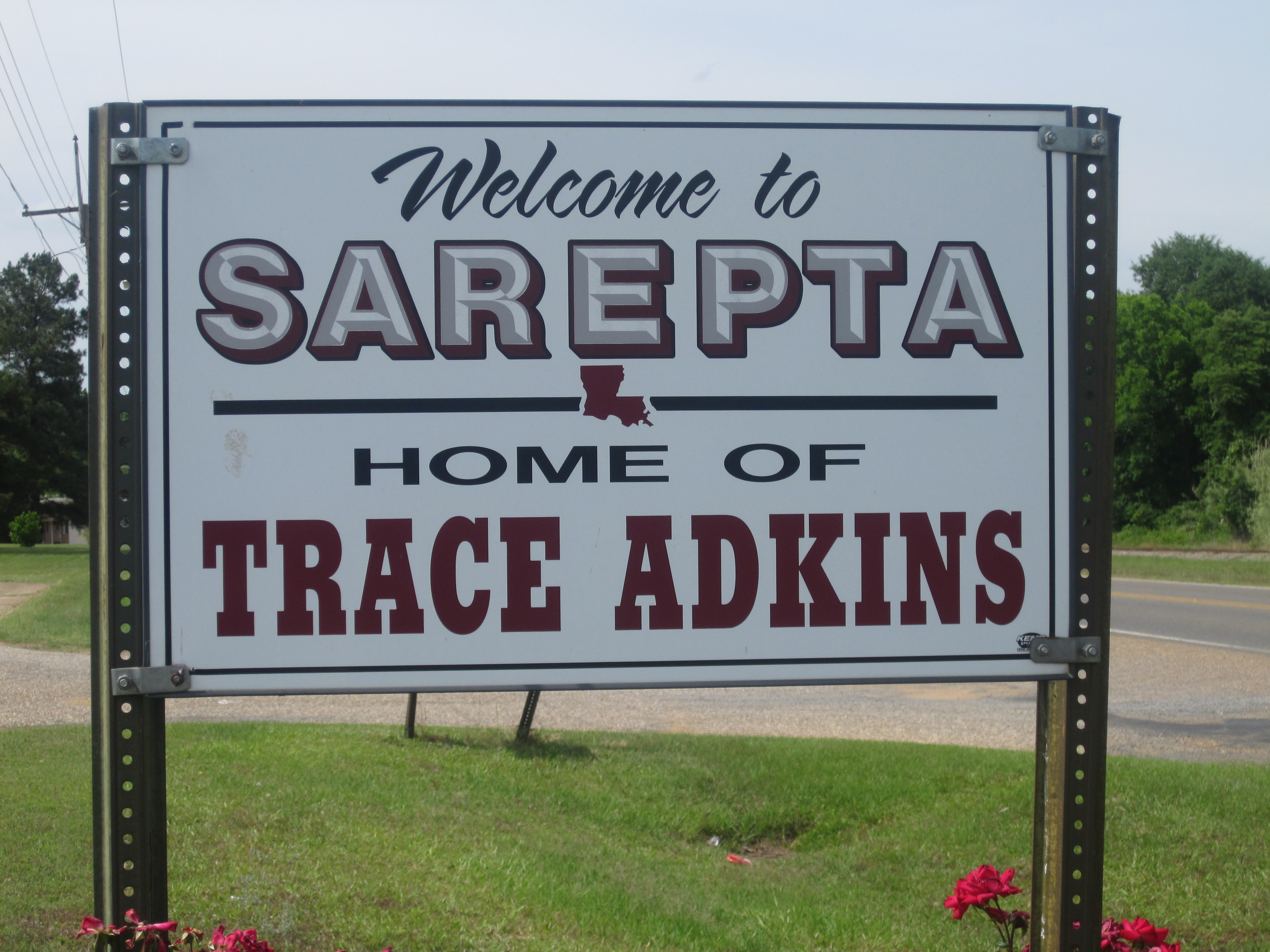
Sarepta, Louisiana, honors its home-town celebrity, Trace Adkins

Adkins was born in Sarepta, Louisiana, the son of Peggy Carraway and Aaron Doyle Adkins. His maternal uncle was the Christian musician James W. Carraway (1923–2008). His musical interest came at an early age when he was 10, and his father bought him a guitar and hired someone to give him lessons.

At Sarepta High School, since defunct, Adkins joined a gospel music group called the New Commitments. He was also a member of the FFA. Later, Adkins attended Louisiana Tech University in Ruston. A walk-on offensive lineman on their football team, Adkins left the team after his freshman season due to a knee injury, without ever playing in a game. Adkins never graduated. After leaving college, he worked on an oil rig. He also played music in a band called Bayou. Adkins also worked as a pharmacy technician before pursuing a career in music. He lost the pinky finger on his left hand in an accident using a knife to open a bucket, and asked doctors to reattach the finger at an angle so that he could continue to play guitar. Adkins moved to play in honky-tonk bars for the next few years in the Ark-La-Tex area and eventually moved to Nashville, Tennessee, in 1992. In late 1994, Adkins met Rhonda Forlaw, who was an executive at Arista Records Nashville. Forlaw had numerous music industry friends come out to hear Adkins over the next few years. Scott Hendricks of Capitol Nashville signed him "on the spot" one night while Adkins was playing at Tillie and Lucy's bar in Mount Juliet, Tennessee.

== Music career ==
=== Early career ===
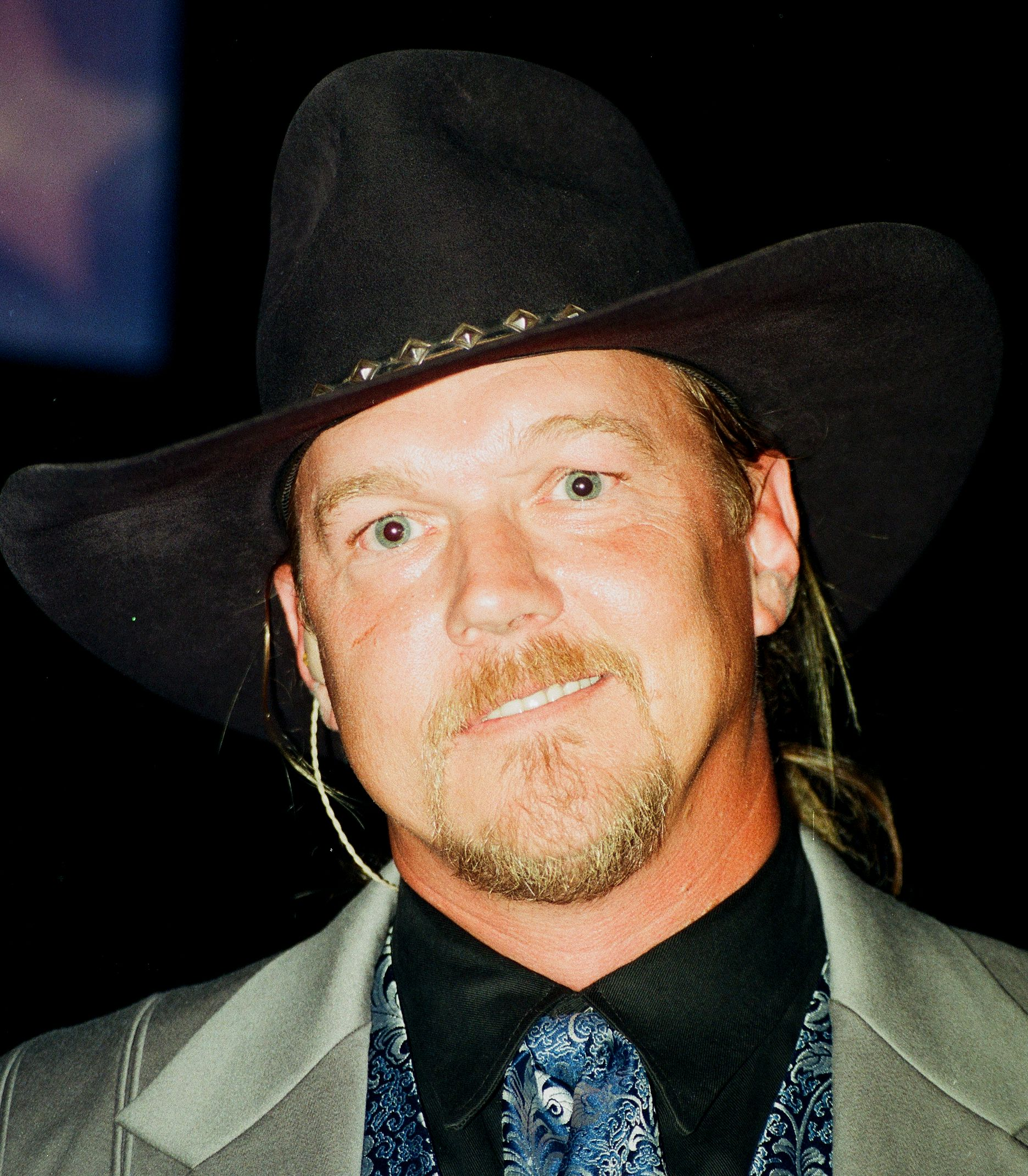
Adkins in 1997

Adkins's first single, which he wrote himself, "There's a Girl in Texas", was released in 1996, reaching the top 20 on the Billboard Hot Country Singles & Tracks charts. It was followed by the release of his debut album, Dreamin' Out Loud, later that year. The album produced several hit singles, including his first top-five single, "Every Light in the House", his first number one in "(This Ain't) No Thinkin' Thing", and another top-five hit in "I Left Something Turned on at Home". The latter single was also a number-one hit in Canada. His second album, Big Time, produced a top five in "The Rest of Mine", but subsequent singles proved less successful. Adkins was named "Top New Male Artist" by the Academy of Country Music in 1997. In 1998, Adkins appeared on the PBS music program Austin City Limits (season 23). A change in management delayed the release of Adkins's third album, but the album (titled More...) was eventually released in late 1999. Although the album's title track reached top 10, More... failed to achieve gold status. Adkins's daughter, Mackenzie, was featured in the "More" video.

=== 2001–2004 ===
In 2001, Adkins was injured in a tractor accident and had to cancel touring temporarily. Shortly after the release of his Chrome album, he entered a 28-day alcohol rehabilitation program in Nashville. Chrome was his first album to reach the top five on the country albums charts; its title track reached top 10 in late 2002.

In 2003, Adkins released two albums—a greatest hits collection and Comin' on Strong. The same year, he was inducted into the Grand Ole Opry. He also made appearances as the center square on the game show Hollywood Squares, and did voice-overs in commercials for fast-food chain KFC. Only one single, "Then They Do", was released from this greatest hits compilation. This album, which succeeded the greatest hits collection, produced two singles: the top-five single "Hot Mama" and "Rough & Ready", which peaked at number 13.

Adkins and Travis Tritt played the roles of prison convicts in a February 2004 episode of the television series Yes, Dear (Greg and Jimmy's Criminals).

=== 2005–2007 ===
In March 2005, Adkins released his album entitled Songs About Me. The title track was released as its first single in December 2004. The album's second single, "Arlington", generated controversy over its content (a first-person account of a fictional soldier who was about to be buried in Arlington National Cemetery). It was followed by "Honky Tonk Badonkadonk", which became a crossover hit, bringing Adkins into the top 40 of the Billboard Hot 100 for the first time.

Adkins's seventh studio album, Dangerous Man, was released in 2006. "Swing", the album's lead-off single, peaked at number 20, while the follow-up "Ladies Love Country Boys" became Adkins's second number-one single on the country charts and his first since "(This Ain't) No Thinkin' Thing" in 1997. Adkins's daughter, Brianna, was featured in the "Ladies Love Country Boys" video. The album's final release, "I Wanna Feel Something", proved unsuccessful on the charts; as a result, Adkins announced that he would stop supporting the single.

In August 2007, Adkins released a single entitled "I Got My Game On". Originally, the song was planned to be the lead-off to a new album, tentatively titled Game On, but Adkins decided not to release a full album, and instead released his second greatest hits compilation, American Man: Greatest Hits Volume II, for which "I Got My Game On" served as the lead-off single. The album has also produced Adkins's fastest-climbing single to date in its second single, "You're Gonna Miss This". "You're Gonna Miss This" has also become his third number-one hit on the Hot Country Songs, as well as the most successful single to date on the Billboard Hot 100 (12), Billboard Pop 100 (19), and Hot Digital Songs charts (8).

Adkins released his first book, entitled A Personal Stand: Observations and Opinions from a Free-Thinking Roughneck.

=== 2008–2009 ===
In 2008, Adkins released the single "Muddy Water," the lead single from X, which was released on November 25. The video for "Muddy Water" has an appearance by fellow Celebrity Apprentice competitor Stephen Baldwin as a man being baptized in a muddy river, and later approaching Adkins as a friend. It reached the top 30 on the country charts, peaking at number 22. "Marry for Money" and "All I Ask for Anymore" were released as the album's second and third singles, and both peaked at number 14 on the country charts.

In November 2008, Adkins made an appearance at the Macy's Thanksgiving Day Parade. He rode with his family on the Jimmy Dean/Tyson Foods float and performed his famous song "You're Gonna Miss This". In 2009, Adkins appeared in local Kansas City commercials to advertise season tickets and the 50th season of the National Football League's Kansas City Chiefs.

Adkins recorded a duet with country legend Ronnie Milsap called "My First Ride" to benefit firefighters and police officers in the U.S. and Canada. Then, after the song's release, the label said 'no' to radio stations playing it with no explanation given. Milsap led a protest at Capitol Records to "Free Trace" and allow the song to be played.

In November 2009, Adkins embarked on the Shine All Night Tour, a co-headline venture with fellow country artist Martina McBride. Also in 2009, he recorded a duet with Blake Shelton titled "Hillbilly Bone", which was released as the lead-off single from Shelton's upcoming sixth album. On October 18, 2009, Adkins made an appearance on Extreme Makeover: Home Edition to help Ty Pennington and his design team build a new home for the Marshall family.

=== 2010–2014: Move to Show Dog-Universal Music ===
In January 2010, Adkins parted ways with his long-time record label, Capitol Nashville, and subsequently signed with Show Dog-Universal Music.

Adkins's first single with the label, "This Ain't No Love Song", was released on May 17, 2010, and served as the lead-off single to his ninth studio album, Cowboy's Back In Town. It debuted at number 54 on the chart for the week of May 29, 2010. The album's second single, "Brown Chicken, Brown Cow", released to country radio on January 10, 2011.

Two men in a small Dodge pickup truck died after crashing into one of Adkins's tour buses on February 13, 2010. The truck was believed to have crossed the "no passing" line in the center of the road, which resulted in the crash. Several members of Adkins's band were aboard the bus, but were not seriously injured. Adkins himself was not on board at the time. On October 10, 2010, Adkins sang the national anthem at Dallas Cowboys Stadium.

On December 18, 2010, Adkins performed at WWE's annual extravaganza WWE Tribute to the Troops to amazing reception by the soldiers in attendance. He appeared once again in an episode of SmackDown live from Nashville, Tennessee, on May 13, 2011, as the special member of the WWE audience.

In March 2011, Adkins released "Just Fishin", which featured his youngest daughter, Trinity, in the video, which was shot at their farm. The song reached number six on Billboard. On June 4, 2011, around 3:35 pm, Adkins's home in Brentwood, Tennessee, burned down. On October 20, 2011, Adkins sang the national anthem at game two of the 2011 World Series in St. Louis.

In April 2011, Adkins revealed that he had a crush on the Baylor Lady Bears' head coach, Kim Mulkey, while the two were in college at Louisiana Tech, then dedicated his performance of "One in a Million You" to her.

Mulkey's sister arranged a phone call in December 2011 between the singer and coach, during which Kim Mulkey invited him to sing at Baylor's home game against Connecticut; Adkins, unable to attend, arranged to perform the national anthem at the Lady Bears' February 2012 home game against the Texas A&M Aggies.

In March 2012, Adkins visited the Lady Bears while on tour in Kansas City to encourage them before their NCAA Championships semifinal match; the team attended one of his concerts later that week.

In February 2012, Adkins appeared as a guest vocalist on Meat Loaf's album Hell in a Handbasket.

Adkins performed "The Star-Spangled Banner" at the West Virginia Mountaineers' home football game against the Baylor Bears on September 29, 2012; his was just the third live performance of the national anthem in the 32-year history of Mountaineer Field.

Adkins released a new album, Love Will..., on May 14, 2013. The album's first single, "Watch the World End", was released to country radio on May 13, 2013. In September 2013, he was announced to be no longer on the Showdog roster according to the official website.

Adkins released his first Christmas album, The King's Gift, on October 29, 2013.

=== 2015–present: Move to Wheelhouse Records ===
On April 6, 2015, Adkins announced he had signed with Broken Bow Records, under the Wheelhouse imprint. In August 2015, Broken Bow announced that Adkins was one of the first artists signed to the label's new imprint, Wheelhouse Records. His first single for the label was "Jesus and Jones", which was released to country radio on January 18, 2016, and peaked at number 41 on the Country Airplay chart. "Lit" was released to country radio on July 25, 2016, though it failed to chart. Both singles are on the album Something's Going On, which was released on March 31, 2017, via Wheelhouse Records, and its title track became a video.

On July 4, 2016, Adkins made a surprise appearance at his hometown Independence Day celebration in Sarepta, Louisiana. He joined on stage the Backbeat Boogie Band with several unrehearsed songs.

In 2019, Adkins appeared on Hardy's new album, Hixtape Volume 1. On the album, he appears on the song "Redneck Tendencies" with Joe Diffie. also in 2019, Adkins later reunited with Blake Shelton in "Hell Right" in Shelton's compilation album Fully Loaded: God's Country.

=== Spokesperson ===
In 2012, Adkins signed a deal with truck stop chain Pilot Flying J to become the company's new spokesman. Adkins also lent his signature voice to Firestone as part of the "Drive a Firestone" campaign to revitalize the brand in 2012. He is the spokesman for Wounded Warrior Project.

== Television career ==
Adkins was a January–March 2008 contestant on NBC's The Celebrity Apprentice. Each celebrity contestant was playing for donations to their selected charity. Adkins played for the Food Allergy and Anaphylaxis Network. Adkins chose the charity because his daughter suffers from life-threatening reactions to peanuts, milk, and eggs. Ultimately, he was the runner-up of that season, losing to Piers Morgan.

Adkins returned for the All-Stars version of The All-Star Celebrity Apprentice. He was the project manager for his team, Plan B, in the first task, which was to sell meatballs and won $670,072, a Celebrity Apprentice record for a first task, for his charity the American Red Cross. Together with Vegas illusionist Penn Jillette, Adkins made it to the finals again (becoming the first and only person in the history of the show to do so), where Adkins won and became the All-Star Celebrity Apprentice. He also broke the record for the highest amount of money raised for his charity by any one person in the history of the show, with $1,524,072 raised for the American Red Cross.

In 2019, Adkins became the host of a new series on INSP, Ultimate Cowboy Showdown. The series has run for three seasons.

== Filmography ==
=== Film ===
Year	Film	Role	Notes
1987	Square Dance	Bayou Band member	as Tracy D. Adkins
2008	Trailer Park of Terror	The Man	
2008	An American Carol	Angel of Death/Trace Adkins	
2010	Tough Trade	Scared	Television movie
2010	Lifted	Jimmy Knox	
2011	The Lincoln Lawyer	Eddie Vogel	
2012	Wyatt Earp's Revenge	Mifflin Kenedy	
2013	A Country Christmas	Sheriff Arrington	
2013	Don't Let Me Go	Driver	
2014	The Virginian	The Virginian	Direct-to-video
2014	Moms' Night Out	Bones	
2014	Palominas	Judge Guilt Roads	
2016	Traded	Ty Stover	
2016	Deepwater Horizon	Massive Man	
2016	Stagecoach: The Texas Jack Story	Texas Jack	
2017	Hickok	Phil Poe	
2018	I Can Only Imagine	Scott Brickell	
2019	The Outsider	Marshal Walker	
2019	Bennett's War	Cal Bennett	
2019	Badland	"The General" Corbin Dandridge	
2021	Apache Junction	Captain Hensley	
2021	Old Henry	Uncle Al	
2021	13 Minutes	Rick	
2022	Maneater	Harlan	
2022	Desperate Riders	Thorn	
2023	Among Wolves	Michael	
2025	Day of Reckoning	Big Buck	
2026	I Can Only Imagine 2	Scott Brickell	

=== Television ===
Year	Show	Role	Notes
2003	King of the Hill	Big John	Episode: "Livin' on Reds, Vitamin C and Propane" (voice)
2003-2004	Hollywood Squares	Himself	5 episodes Season 5 May 19–23, 2003, 5 episodes Season 6 Apr 5–9, 2004
2004	Yes, Dear	Curtis	Episode: "Greg and Jimmy's Criminals"
2004-2005	King of the Hill	Elvin Mackleston	3 episodes (voice)
2005	Higglytown Heroes	Cowboy Hero	Episode: "Higgly Hoedown" (voice)
2005	Blue Collar TV	Himself	Episode: "Battle of the Sexes"
2005	My Name is Earl	Himself	Episode: "Pilot"
2007-2009	Extreme Makeover: Home Edition	Himself	2 episodes
2008	The Young and the Restless	Himself	Episode: "#1.8885"
2008	The Celebrity Apprentice	Himself / Contestant	Runner-up
2009	The Late Late Show with Craig Ferguson	Himself	Episode: "1/21/2009 Trace Adkins, Perez Hilton"
2010	Ace of Cakes	Himself	Episode: "A Four Letter Word for Pastry"
2012	American Dad!	Transvestite	Episode: "The Unbrave One" (voice)
2013	All-Star Celebrity Apprentice	Himself / Contestant	Winner
2013	To Appomattox	John Gregg	4 episodes
2015	The Night Shift	Smalls	Episode: "Moving On"
2015	Moonbeam City	Sizzle Conrad	Episode: "Glitzotrene: One Town's Seduction"
2018	The Voice	Himself/Advisor	Season 14 of Team Blake
2019–present	Ultimate Cowboy Showdown	Host	3 seasons broadcast; 4th one in production
2022	Monarch	Albie Roman	Main cast
2023	Barmageddon	Himself	Episode: "Mike Vrabel vs. Trace Adkins"

== Personal life ==
Adkins has two daughters, Tarah and Sarah, with his first wife, Barbara Lewis, and three daughters with his third wife, the former Rhonda Forlaw: Mackenzie, Brianna, and Trinity. Adkins endorsed Mitt Romney in the 2012 United States presidential election and performed at the 2012 Republican National Convention in Tampa, Florida. He performed the national anthem at Tennessee governor Bill Haslam's second inauguration as governor of Tennessee in 2015 and a year later during presidential candidate Donald Trump's nomination at the 2016 Republican National Convention.

At age 17, Adkins was in an automobile accident in which his 1955 Chevrolet pickup truck hit a school bus head-on. He broke some ribs, punctured both lungs and his nose was partially torn off. Adkins was forced to give up college football after a severe knee injury at Louisiana Tech. He has also experienced a number of serious injuries as an adult, including being shot by his second ex-wife Julie Curtis. In February 1994, Trace was married to his second wife Julie Lauren Curtis and was involved in a serious domestic incident. The confrontation occurred after an argument about Adkins's excessive drinking. During the altercation, Julie Curtis pointed a .38-caliber revolver at him. Adkins attempted to disarm her, reportedly trying to scare her into giving up the gun, but she fired, and the bullet passed through his left lung, heart, and right lung, nearly killing him. Adkins was rushed to the hospital via helicopter and underwent emergency open-heart surgery. Doctors were able to save his life, though he required extensive medical treatment, including draining his lung and patching the hole in his heart. Despite the severity of the incident, Adkins did not press charges against Curtis, believing she was not intentionally trying to kill him. The shooting ultimately led to the end of their marriage, and they divorced later that year. Julie Lauren Curtis later stepped away from the public eye and lived a private life until her death in 2021 at the age of 59. In 1989, Adkins, along with nine coworkers, were stranded on an offshore oil rig in the Gulf of Mexico during Hurricane Chantal.

In 2001, Adkins entered a 28-day alcohol rehabilitation facility. After relapsing in early 2014, Adkins checked into rehabilitation for alcoholism after getting into an altercation on a cruise ship. In March 2014, Rhonda filed for divorce citing irreconcilable differences. Rhonda and Trace then dismissed and expunged the divorce petition via T.C.A. Section 36-4-127 (Expunction of Divorce Records upon Reconciliation of Parties) due to an attempted reconciliation. Less than a month later, Trace filed for divorce. Since this time, the matter has been pending, with the parties awaiting finalization of their divorce. On August 24, 2023, the Tennessee Court of Appeals finalized said divorce. The case has now been remanded to the lower court.

On October 12, 2019, Adkins married Canadian actress Victoria Pratt in New Orleans, Louisiana.

== Discography ==
=== Studio albums ===
- 1996: Dreamin' Out Loud
- 1997: Big Time
- 1999: More...
- 2001: Chrome
- 2003: Comin' On Strong
- 2005: Songs About Me
- 2006: Dangerous Man
- 2008: X
- 2010: Cowboy's Back in Town
- 2011: Proud to Be Here
- 2013: Love Will...
- 2017: Something's Going On
- 2021: The Way I Wanna Go

=== Compilation albums ===
- 2003: Greatest Hits Collection, Vol. 1
- 2007: American Man: Greatest Hits Volume II
- 2010: The Definitive Greatest Hits: 'Til the Last Shot's Fired
- 2012: 10 Great Songs
- 2013: Icon
- 2014: 10 Great Songs: 20th Century Masters: The Millennium Collection

=== Billboard number-one hits ===
- "(This Ain't) No Thinkin' Thing" (1 week, 1997)
- "Ladies Love Country Boys" (2 weeks, 2006–2007)
- "You're Gonna Miss This" (3 weeks, 2007–2008)
- "Hillbilly Bone" Featuring Blake Shelton (1 week, 2009–2010)

== Awards ==
Year	Award	Result
1997	ACM Top New Male Vocalist	Won
2008	CMT Male Video of the Year - "I Got My Game On"	Won
2008	Grammy - Best Male Country Vocal Performance - "You're Gonna Miss This"	Nominated
2008	Grammy - Best Country Song - "You're Gonna Miss This" (Ashley Gorley & Lee Thomas Miller)	Nominated
2009	ACM Single of the Year - "You're Gonna Miss This"	Won
2009	Grammy - Best Male Country Vocal Performance - "All I Ask For Anymore"	Nominated
2009	Grammy - Best Country Song - "All I Ask For Anymore" (Casey Beathard & Tim James)	Nominated
2010	ACM Vocal Event of the Year - "Hillbilly Bone" with Blake Shelton	Won
2010	CMT Award - Collaborative Video of the Year - "Hillbilly Bone" with Blake Shelton	Won

== See also ==
- Owney (dog)
