= Fry You Like Fish @ The Jam =

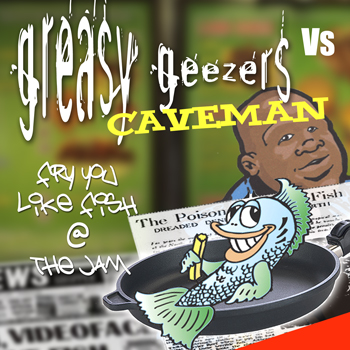
- Single Release Cover Artwork

Single by Greasy Geezers featuring Caveman
- Released: 3 October 2011
- Genre: Electro, pop, hip hop
- Length: 3:20 (Radio edit)
- Label: I-innovate (UK)
- Songwriters: MCM, Ernest Kyei (Videoface), Micheal Adelakun (Videoface), Najero Okenabirhie

Greasy Geezers Related Releases singles chronology
"Conceptual Love" (2010)	"Fry You Like Fish @ The Jam" (2011)	"Greasy Geezers Revival Jubilee" (2012)

"Fry You Like Fish @ The Jam" is an electro commercial dance single from the dance production unit Greasy Geezers. The song was released on 3 October 2011 as part of a digital EP under the same name.

== Background ==
The single is an adaptation of a UK Jazz Hip-Hop release performed by Caveman named "Fry You Like Fish". This relationship coined the artist name ‘"Greasy Geezers vs. Caveman"’. The initial ‘Fry You Like Fish’ single was released in 1990 over 20 years prior to the dance single. Renowned UK Hip Hop Radio presenter Tim Westwood was a pivotal promoter for the caveman group through the early 1990s.

The 2011 dance song incorporated lyrics by the former Caveman front man MCM (Mark Layman) whose vocals were taken from recording sessions from the 2011 MCM album ‘The Gospel: The Missing Gems for MCM Caveman’. The dance release was considered part of a hip-hop golden age 'old to new' project created by indie label I-innovate (UK) concerned with remakes of hip-hop/dance tracks from the 1980s and 1990s.

== Music video ==
The audiovisual supporting the release was initially based on a comedic storyline written by producer Najero Okenabirhie later updated by director James Ward. The video was filmed in the South London traditional chip shop ‘Benny’s’ owned by actor Ben Stylianou who at the time of the release was a presenter for The DIY show on the QVC TV channel (BSkyB). A special comedic performance was provided by X-factor UK, 2010 artist Bada Badoo as the boyfriend of actress Gabriella Navarro who under a spell cast by a goldfish transforms into a mermaid. The music video illustrated the dance single vocal hook "'lose the negative, get the positive'" through invert and positive visuals representing the spell enforced by the goldfish. The screenplay was influenced by the 1980s film 'Splash'. The video also introduced child actor Christian The ‘Dragonfish’ and music producers ‘Videoface’. Scene illustrations using Greasy Geezer artwork were inspired by 1920s intertitles seen in the Hollywood silent movie era.

== Cover artwork ==
The single cover artwork contains graffiti based retro fonts and imagery similar to the Greasy Geezers logo. The cover depicts a fish in a frying pan within a chip shop. The picture background was actually taken from the chip shop used in the music video supporting the single release.

== Pre-release reaction ==
The single gained features on some urban publications and popular magazines in the UK and Canada. Specialist electro dance publications also supported the single. Prior to the release date the single received airplay on regional radio dance shows in the UK including Radio Verulam 92.6 (Hertfordshire). The radio edit was played on leading UK south-east pirate radio stations as well as European radio Koelncampus 100.0 fm (Germany). The song also gained airplay stateside on the Time2grind Radio Show (Streets106.fm / New Jersey) and was picked up internationally in South–African music press including BPM magazine.

The release was supported with online comedic animation based short-films presented by Greasy Geezers with music producers Videoface.

== Single release track listing ==
Based on iTunes track listing
No.	Title	Length
1.	"Fry You Like Fish @ the Jam" (Radio Edit)"	3:20
2.	"Fry You Like Fish @ the Jam" (Brezzi Radio Edit)"	3:22
3.	"Fry You Like Fish @ the Jam" (Extended Fry Up Mix)"	6:22
4.	"Fry You Like Fish @ the Jam" (Mcm Acapella Special)"	3:18
5.	"Fry You Like Fish @ the Jam" (Instrumental)"	4:22
6.	"Fry You Like Fish @ the Jam" (Club Mix)"	7:22
7.	"Greasy Geezers vs. Videoface (Comedy Battle) - Part 3"	9:49
8.	"A Fish Called Brezzi (Instrumental)"	7:22
Total length:		45:18

== Credits and personnel ==
- MCM (Mark Layman) – Songwriter and Vocals
- Ernest Kyei (Videoface) – Songwriter, Producer, Mixing, Mastering (2nd Stage), Keyboards and Programming
- Micheal Adelakun (Videoface) - Songwriter, Producer and Programming
- Najero Okenabirhie – I-innovate (UK) - Songwriter and Executive Producer
- Jeff Mortimer (JM-Mastering) - Mastering (1st Stage)
