= Tell Me Why =

Tell Me Why may refer to:

== Books ==
- Tell Me Why (magazine), a British children's magazine relaunched as World of Wonder
- Tell Me Why, a 2009 book by Eric Walters

== Music ==
=== Albums ===
- Tell Me Why (Archie Roach album), 2019
- Tell Me Why (Bobby Vinton album), 1964, or the title song
- Tell Me Why (Jann Browne album), 1990, or the title song
- Tell Me Why (Wynonna Judd album) 1993, or the title song
- Tell Me Why, a 2002 EP and its title song by Pocket Venus

=== Songs ===
- "Tell Me Why" (1951 song), song written by Al Alberts and Marty Gold, popularized by The Four Aces and by Eddie Fisher
- "Tell Me Why" (1956 song), song written by Titus Turner, popularized by Marie Knight, and later by Elvis Presley
- "Tell Me Why" (Beatles song), 1964
- "Tell Me Why" (Declan Galbraith song), 2002
- "Tell Me Why" (Earl Thomas Conley song), 1981
- "Tell Me Why" (Echobelly song)
- "Tell Me Why" (Exposé song), 1989
- "Tell Me Why" (Genesis song), 1991
- "Tell Me Why" (Jann Browne song), 1990
- "Tell Me Why" (John Holt song), 1974. Covered by Musical Youth in 1983
- "Tell Me Why" (The Kid Laroi song), 2020
- "Tell Me Why" (M.I.A. song), 2010
- "Tell Me Why" (Monica Anghel and Marcel Pavel song), 2002
- "Tell Me Why" (Neil Young song), 1970
- "Tell Me Why" (Prezioso & Marvin song), 1999
- "Tell Me Why" (Spice Girls song), 2000
- "Tell Me Why" (Supermode song), 2006
- "Tell Me Why" (Wah Wah Collective song), 2013
- "Tell Me Why" (Wynonna Judd song), 1993
- "Tell Me Why (The Riddle)", a 2000 song by Paul van Dyk and Saint Etienne
- "Tell Me Why", by the Bee Gees from 2 Years On
- "Tell Me Why", by Berlin from Pleasure Victim
- "Tell Me Why", by Eddie Cochran from Singin' to My Baby, adapted from
  - "Tell Me Why", written by Mitchell Parish, Michael Edwards, and Sigmund Spaeth, adapted from
  - "Tell Me Why", composed by Roy L. Burtch, lyrics by Fred Mower, c. 1899
- "Tell Me Why", by Gorky Park from Moscow Calling
- "Tell Me Why", by John Cale from Walking on Locusts
- "Tell Me Why", by Jonas Brothers from the TV series Jonas
- "Tell Me Why", by Musical Youth
- "Tell Me Why", by Norman Fox & The Rob-Roys, and covered in 1961 by Dion and the Belmonts
- "Tell Me Why", by the Penpals from the Berserk soundtrack
- "Tell Me Why", by P.O.D. from When Angels & Serpents Dance
- "Tell Me Why", by Taylor Swift from Fearless
- "Tell Me Why", by Three Days Grace from Human
- "Tell Me Why", by Will Smith featuring Mary J. Blige from Smith's album Lost and Found
- "Tell Me Why", from the musical A Man of No Importance

== Others ==
- Tell Me Why (video game), a video game by Dontnod Entertainment

== See also ==
- Tell Me (disambiguation)
