= Tell Me =

Tell Me may refer to:

- Tell Me..., a 1979 album by Jimmy Knepper
- Tell me (advertisement), a 2005 Chinese-language newspaper ad calling for universal suffrage in Hong Kong
- Tell Me (TV series), a 2019 South Korean quiz show
- Tellme Networks, a defunct American telecommunications company owned by Microsoft
- Dis-moi, a 1980 documentary film by Chantal Akerman
- Tell Me, a 2005 short film by Shandi Mitchell
- Tell Me, a 2008 short film starring Sean Paul Lockhart

== Songs ==
- "Tell Me!" (August and Telma song), representing Iceland at Eurovision 2000
- "Tell Me" (Billie Myers song), 1998
- "Tell Me" (Bobby Valentino song), 2005
- "Tell Me" (Diddy song), 2006
- "Tell Me" (Dru Hill song), 1996
- "Tell Me" (Groove Theory song), 1995
- "Tell Me" (hide song), 1994
- "Tell Me" (Jake Owen song), 2010
- "Tell Me" (Mel B song), 2000
- "Tell Me" (Rolling Stones song), 1964
- "Tell Me" (Sandy Mölling song), 2004
- "Tell Me" (Smilez and Southstar song), 2002
- "Tell Me" (Sonny Fodera and Clementine Douglas song), 2025
- "Tell Me" (White Lion song), 1988
- "Tell Me" (Wonder Girls song), 2007
- "Tell Me (I'll Be Around)", by Shades, 1996
- "Drops of Jupiter (Tell Me)", by Train, 2001
- "Tell Me", by 2hollis from Star, 2025
- "Tell Me", by Adelitas Way from Notorious
- "Tell Me", by Aerosmith from Music from Another Dimension!, 2012
- "Tell Me", by Belinda Carlisle from Real, 1993
- "Tell Me", by Big Tymers from How You Luv That Vol. 2
- "Tell Me", by Bing Crosby from Bing with a Beat
- "Tell Me", by Bob Dylan from The Bootleg Series Volumes 1–3 (Rare & Unreleased) 1961–1991
- "Tell Me", by Boston from Greatest Hits, 1997
- "Tell Me", by Broderick Jones, which represented Kansas in the American Song Contest
- "Tell Me", by Carly Rae Jepsen from Tug Of War, 2008
- "Tell Me", by Case from Personal Conversation
- "Tell Me", by Chaz Jankel from Chazablanca
- "Tell Me", by Cliff Richard from Me and My Shadows
- "Tell Me", by Clyde McPhatter
- "Tell Me", by Corey Hart from Corey Hart
- "Tell Me", by Corinne Bailey Rae from The Heart Speaks in Whispers
- "Tell Me", by Destiny's Child from Destiny's Child
- "Tell Me", by Dick and Dee Dee
- "Tell Me", by Dropping Daylight from Brace Yourself, 2006
- "Tell Me", by Galaxie 500 from On Fire
- "Tell Me", by Gerardo from Dos
- "Tell Me", by Goldfinger from Open Your Eyes
- "Tell Me", by Gotthard from Firebirth
- "Tell Me", by The Grass Roots from Where Were You When I Needed You
- "Tell Me", by Hanna-McEuen from Hanna-McEuen
- "Tell Me", by Howlin' Wolf from Howlin' Wolf
- "Tell Me", by Infinite from Top Seed
- "Tell Me", by Inna from Inna
- "Tell Me", by Joey Albert
- "Tell Me", by Kaskade from Redux EP 002
- "Tell Me", by Laleh from Laleh
- "Tell Me", by Lasgo from Far Away
- "Tell Me", by Lil' Flip from I Need Mine
- "Tell Me", by Lionel Richie from Can't Slow Down: 20th Anniversary Deluxe Edition
- "Tell Me", by Lost Frequencies
- "Tell Me", by Mark 'Oh
- "Tell Me", by Marshmello from Joytime II
- "Tell Me", by Nick Kamen
- "Tell Me", by Pat Benatar from Go
- "Tell Me", by Pseudo Echo from Love an Adventure
- "Tell Me", by Roam from Backbone
- "Tell Me", by S.E.S. from Love, 1999
- "Tell Me", by Sara Evans from Real Fine Place, 2005
- "Tell Me", by Terry Kath
- "Tell Me", by Tiësto (as Clear View) from In Search of Sunrise 6: Ibiza
- "Tell Me", by Toni Braxton from More Than a Woman
- "Tell Me", by Total from Total
- "Tell Me", by Usher from Hard II Love, 2016
- "Tell Me", by Why Don't We
- "Tell Me", by Wretch 32 from FR32
- "Tell Me", written by Arthur Korb and Milton Yakus
- "Tell Me (P.A.C.)", by Story of the Year from The Black Swan

== See also ==
- "Dime" (Ivy Queen song) (Spanish for "Tell Me"), a song by Ivy Queen
- Tell Me How (disambiguation)
- Tell Me Why (disambiguation)
