= Julie Roberts (album) =

Studio album by Julie Roberts
- Released: May 25, 2004
- Studio: Cartee Day Studios, Doghouse Studio and Tin Ear Studios (Nashville, Tennessee)
- Genre: Country
- Length: 42:23
- Label: Mercury Nashville
- Producer: Brent Rowan

Julie Roberts chronology
| Julie Roberts (2004) | Men & Mascara (2006) |

Singles from Julie Roberts
- 1. "Break Down Here" Released: February 23, 2004; 2. "The Chance" Released: October 11, 2004; 3. "Wake Up Older" Released: January 2005

Professional ratings
Review scores
| Source | Rating |
|---|---|
| Allmusic | 4/5 stars |

Julie Roberts is the debut studio album by American country music artist Julie Roberts. Released in 2004 on Mercury Nashville Records, the album produced three singles for Roberts on the Billboard country charts. "Break Down Here" was the only one of these singles to reach Top 40, peaking at 18. The second and third singles, "The Chance" and "Wake Up Older", reached No. 47 and No. 46, respectively. The album has been certified gold by the Recording Industry Association of America (RIAA).

"Break Down Here" was previously recorded by Trace Adkins as "I'd Sure Hate to Break Down Here" on his 2003 album Comin' On Strong, while "No Way Out" was previously released as a single by Suzy Bogguss from her 1996 album Give Me Some Wheels. Additionally, Jann Browne previously released "You Ain't Down Home" as a single from her 1990 album Tell Me Why.

== Track listing ==
Julie Roberts track listing
| No. | Title | Writer(s) | Length |
|---|---|---|---|
| 1. | "You Ain't Down Home" | Jamie O'Hara | 3:16 |
| 2. | "Break Down Here" | Jess Brown; Patrick Jason Matthews | 4:06 |
| 3. | "Pot of Gold" | Frank Rogers; Chris Stapleton | 3:23 |
| 4. | "Unlove Me" | Matthews; Paul Overstreet | 3:13 |
| 5. | "Just 'Cause We Can" | Rogers; Stapleton | 4:15 |
| 6. | "Wake Up Older" | Lisa Carver | 3:07 |
| 7. | "If You Had Called Yesterday" | Cory Batten; Kent Blazy; Wendell Mobley | 3:53 |
| 8. | "No Way Out" | Marcus Hummon; Darrell Scott | 3:14 |
| 9. | "I Can't Get Over You" | Julie Miller | 4:28 |
| 10. | "Rain on a Tin Roof" | Stapleton; Trent Willmon | 4:35 |
| 11. | "The Chance" | Deanna Bryant; Liz Hengber | 4:47 |
| Total length: | | | 42:23 |

== Personnel ==
As listed in liner notes.

- Julie Roberts – lead vocals
- Gordon Mote – keyboards
- Tim Lauer – pump organ (2), accordion (3), keyboards (7, 9)
- Brent Rowan – electric guitars, backing vocals (8), hand claps (8)
- Bryan Sutton – acoustic guitars, mandocello (2, 3)
- Al Perkins – steel guitar (4, 9)
- David Hungate – bass guitar
- Shannon Forrest – drums
- Eric Darken – percussion (5, 8)
- Wes Hightower – backing vocals (1, 3–10)
- Delbert McClinton – backing vocals (2)
- Vince Gill – backing vocals (4, 11)
- Pat McLaughlin – backing vocals (8)

=== Production ===
- Brent Rowan – producer, additional recording
- Gary Paczosa – recording, mixing, additional recording
- David Bryant – recording assistant
- Steve Crowder – recording assistant
- Chip Matthews – additional recording
- Thomas Johnson – mix assistant
- Robert Hadley – mastering
- Doug Sax – mastering
- The Mastering Lab (Hollywood, California) – mastering location
- Karen Naff – art direction, design
- Robert Sebree – photography
- Cherie Combs – hair stylist, make-up
- Janine Israel – wardrobe stylist

== Chart performance ==
=== Weekly charts ===
| Chart (2004) | Peak position |
|---|---|
| US Billboard 200 | 51 |
| US Top Country Albums (Billboard) | 9 |

=== Year-end charts ===
| Chart (2004) | Position |
|---|---|
| US Top Country Albums (Billboard) | 45 |
| Chart (2005) | Position |
| US Top Country Albums (Billboard) | 60 |

=== Singles ===
| Year | Single | Peak chart positions | |
| Year | Single | US Country | US |
|---|---|---|---|
| 2004 | "Break Down Here" | 18 | 81 |
| 2004 | "The Chance" | 47 | — |
| 2005 | "Wake Up Older" | 46 | — |
"—" denotes releases that did not chart

== Certifications ==
| Region | Certification |
|---|---|
| United States (RIAA) | Gold |
