= Men & Mascara =

Studio album by Julie Roberts
- Released: June 27, 2006
- Studio: Ocean Way Nashville; Essential Sound (Nashville, TN); Sound Kitchen (Franklin, TN)
- Genre: Country
- Length: 44:47
- Label: Mercury Nashville
- Producer: Byron Gallimore; James Stroud

Julie Roberts chronology
Julie Roberts (2004)	Men & Mascara (2006)	Alive (2011)

Singles from Men & Mascara
- 1. "Men & Mascara" Released: March 27, 2006; 2. "Girl Next Door" Released: June 26, 2006

Professional ratings
Review scores
Source	Rating
Allmusic	4/5 stars

Men & Mascara is the second studio album by American country music artist Julie Roberts, released on June 27, 2006, via Mercury Nashville. It was her last album for the label.

Roberts broke through in 2004 with her eponymous debut album, which spawned the top-20 hit "Break Down Here". This success led the record to be certified Gold by the RIAA. For this record, Roberts worked with Byron Gallimore and James Stroud. This was also the first album in which she has a writer's credit, co-writing four of the album's 12 tracks.

Despite early success at country radio, the album's two singles, "Men & Mascara" and "Girl Next Door" (a cover of the 2005 song by rock band Saving Jane) both failed to enter the US Hot Country Songs chart. Even with that, the album generally received acclaim from music critics and actually outpeaked her debut studio album, hitting number four on the US Top Country Albums chart.

"Too Damn Young" was later recorded by musician Luke Bryan on his 2011 studio album Tailgates & Tanlines.

== Singles ==
"Men & Mascara" was serviced to country radio on March 27, 2006, as the lead single from the project, marking Roberts' first single since "Wake Up Older" was released in January 2005. The song completely failed to enter Billboard's Hot Country Songs, although it did enter the Radio & Records Country Indicator chart, rising only to a minuscule peak of number 46 on the chart the week of May 12, 2006. A cover of Saving Jane's 2005 hit "Girl Next Door" would be released on June 26, 2006, as the second and final single from the album. Mercury Records VP John Ettinger described the track as having "tempo and a big hook." Like the previous single, this song also failed to enter the Hot Country Songs chart. Presumably because of the failure of these two songs, no other singles from Men & Mascara were released.

== Commercial performance ==
Men & Mascara entered the Billboard Top Country Albums chart the week of July 15, 2006, at number four, with 31,000 copies sold first week, giving Roberts her highest-charting album to date. It also debuted at number 25 on the Billboard 200. It spent 8 weeks on the Billboard 200, its final being on September 2, 2006, at number 187. The album would spend 13 weeks on Top Country Albums, its last week being on October 7, 2006, at number 58.

== Track listing ==
All tracks produced by Byron Gallimore except "Girl Next Door", produced by James Stroud

Men & Mascara track listing
No.	Title	Writer(s)	Length
1.	"Paint and Pillows"	Arlis Albritton; Casey Kessel; Robin Lee Bruce	3:48
2.	"Smile"	Danny Wells; Tony Mullins; Julie Roberts	4:04
3.	"Too Damn Young"	Albritton; Koesel	3:27
4.	"Men & Mascara"	Chris Lindsey; Hillary Lindsey; Marv Green; Aimee Mayo	3:25
5.	"First to Never Know"	Wells; Mullins; Roberts	3:24
6.	"Chasin' Whiskey"	Albritton; Cliff Cody	3:50
7.	"A Bridge That's Burning"	Wells; Mullins; Roberts	4:01
8.	"Girl Next Door"	Marti Dodson; Pat Buzzard; Kris Misevski; Dak Goodman; Jeremy Martin	2:59
9.	"Lonely Alone"	Jim Brown; Don Sampson	3:38
10.	"That Ain't a Crime"	Chris Stapleton; Carson Chamberlain	3:30
11.	"Mama Don't Cry"	Rivers Rutherford; H. Lindsey	3:53
12.	"All I Want Is You"	Roberts; Roxie Dean; Mickey Jack Cones	4:49
Total length:			44:47

== Personnel ==
- Julie Roberts – lead vocals
- Steve Nathan – Wurlitzer electric piano (1–7, 9–12), synthesizers (1–7, 9–12), organ (1–7, 9–12), acoustic piano (8), keyboards (8)
- Tom Bukovac – electric guitars (1–7, 9–12)
- B. James Lowry – acoustic guitars (1–7, 9–12), resonator guitar (1–7, 9–12)
- Mark Casstevens – acoustic guitars (8), banjo (8)
- Jeff King – electric guitars (8)
- Paul Franklin – dobro (1–7, 9–12), slide guitar (1–7, 9–12), steel guitar
- Aubrey Haynie – mandolin (1–7, 9–12), fiddle (1–7, 9–12)
- Glenn Worf – bass guitar (1, 6, 10, 11)
- Mike Brignardello – bass guitar (2–5, 7, 9, 10, 12)
- David Hungate – bass guitar (8)
- Lonnie Wilson – drums (1–7, 9–12), loops (1–7, 9–12), percussion (1–7, 9–12)
- Paul Leim – drums (8)
- Lisa Cochran – backing vocals (1, 6, 10, 11)
- Russell Terrell – backing vocals (1–3, 5–7, 9–11)
- Lisa Gregg – backing vocals (2, 3, 5, 9, 12)
- Hillary Lindsey – backing vocals (4)
- Crystal Taliefero – backing vocals (7)
- Chip Davis – backing vocals (8)
- Marty Slayton – backing vocals (8)
- Greg Barnhill – backing vocals (12)

=== Production ===
- Brian Wright – A&R
- Bryan Gallimore – producer (1–7, 9–12), mixing (1–7, 9–12)
- James Stroud – producer (8)
- Julian King – recording (1–7, 9–12)
- Chuck Ainlay – recording (8), mixing (8)
- David Bryant – recording assistant (1–7, 9–12)
- Bryan Graban – recording assistant (1–7, 9–12)
- Steve Beers – recording assistant (8), mix assistant (8)
- Matt Coles – recording assistant (8), mix assistant (8)
- Jesse Chrisman – additional engineer (1–7, 9–12)
- Sara Lesher – additional engineer (1–7, 9–12)
- Erik Lutkins – additional engineer (1–7, 9–12)
- Adam Ayan – mastering at Gateway Mastering (Portland, Maine)
- Ann Callis – production coordinator (1–7, 9–12)
- Tammy Luker – production assistant (8)
- Doug Rich – production assistant (8)
- Karen Naff – art direction, design
- Danny Clinch – photography
- Earl Cox – hair stylist
- Susan McCarthy – make-up
- Claudia Fowler – wardrobe stylist
- Ron Shapiro – management

== Charts ==
Chart (2006)	Peak position
US Billboard 200	25
US Top Country Albums (Billboard)	4
