= Suzie McNeil =

Canadian singer and songwriter (born 1976)

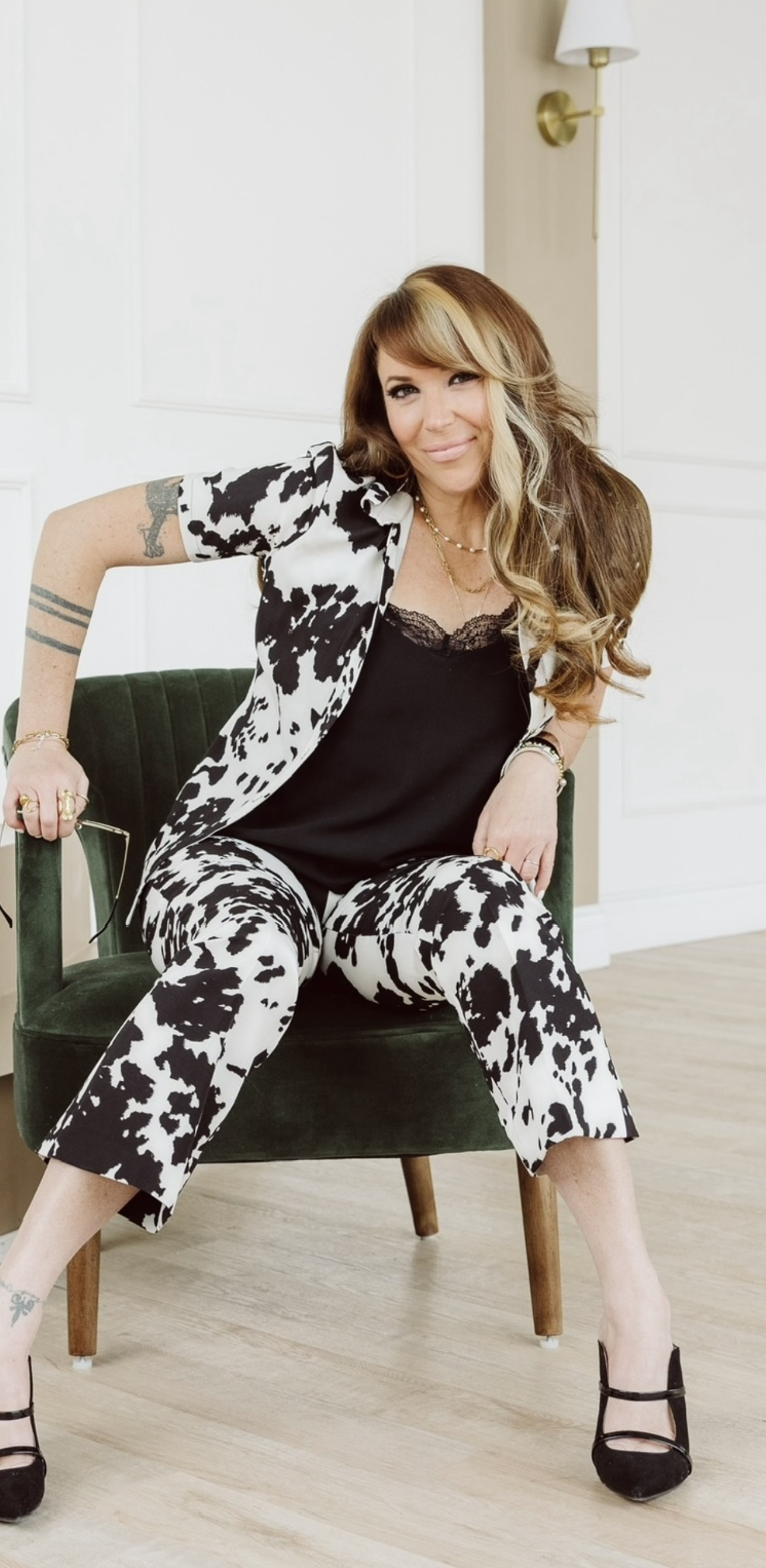
- McNeil in 2026

Background information
- Born: Susan Jane McNeil; October 15, 1976 (age 49); Mississauga, Ontario, Canada
- Genres: Pop rock
- Occupations: Singer, songwriter, television singing competition judge
- Instruments: Vocals, Guitar, Piano, Keyboards, Harmonica, Accordion
- Years active: 2005–present
- Labels: Curve; Universal Music Canada; 604
- Website: suziemcneil.com

Susan Jane "Suzie" McNeil is a Canadian pop rock singer and songwriter. After garnering attention as a contestant on Rock Star: INXS in 2005, McNeil began pursuing a musical career and released her debut album, Broken & Beautiful, on April 10, 2007. Its second single, "Believe" was re-recorded with the National Arts Centre Orchestra in support of Canada's Own the Podium campaign, and served as the official anthem of the Canadian team for the 2010 Winter Olympics. McNeil performed alongside Theory of a Deadman and Andrée Watters at the halftime show during the 96th Grey Cup. Her second studio album, Rock-n-Roller (2008), spawned the successful single "Supergirl", a cover of the Saving Jane song. In 2011, McNeil signed with Canadian label 604 Records and enjoyed mainstream success with the songs "Drama Queen" and "Merry Go Round". They preceded the release of her third studio album, Dear Love, which came out on August 7, 2012.

In 2014, after a two-year hiatus from her solo career, McNeil teamed up with Elisha Hoffman, Rebecca Lynn Howard, and Marti Frederiksen to form the country rock quartet Loving Mary. They have recorded an EP released in 2015, and have reportedly written enough songs for a full-length album to follow shortly thereafter.

== Biography ==
=== Personal life ===
McNeil dated bandmate, Canadian musician Sean Cotton, while competing on Rockstar INXS. They were exclusive for several years before she moved to pursue her musical career. McNeil briefly dated stage actor Scott Walters in 2007 after the pair met working on We Will Rock You; they got engaged that summer, but ended up separating. On October 14, 2013, McNeil became engaged to musician Andrew McTaggart while in Las Vegas celebrating her birthday. The pair moved to Nashville, Tennessee in early 2014 and married on June 7, 2014. McNeil had a son named Findlay born November 17, 2017.

== Career ==
=== 2002—2007: Career beginnings and Broken and Beautiful ===
McNeil began performing on the late 1990s by working as a backing vocalists for a number of Canadian artists including Jeff Healey, Ronnie Hawkins, and Glass Tiger's Alan Frew. In 1999 she was hired to perform as part of ABBA-Mania, an ABBA cover band where she performed the parts originated by Agnetha Fältskog.

In 2004, McNeil recorded the "Arctic Cove" and "Sky Screamer" jingles for Marineland as a one-time, lump-sum project. Following a Toronto Star exposé published in 2012 that detailed employee allegations of animal neglect, McNeil tweeted, “I need to get the tag line replaced with ‘all the whales haaaaate... Marineland!’” Although McNeil requested her voice be removed from the commercials, she acknowledged in a public statement, “Because of the original contract, Marineland owns and has the right to continue using that recording, despite my feelings.”

In 2005, McNeil was a contestant on Rock Star: INXS, finishing fourth overall in the competition. In January 2006, McNeil moved to Los Angeles, to develop her music career. On January 26, 2006, she announced plans to record her first CD with Executive Producer John Kalodner and Producer Marti Frederiksen. In the summer of 2006, McNeil performed as a backup singer for Pink on her North American tour.

McNeil's single "Hung Up" gained significant radio airplay, especially in Canada. The music video was released to MuchMoreMusic on the week of February 19, 2007, and was uploaded to YouTube on March 29, 2007.

McNeil's song "Believe" was originally recorded on her debut studio album, Broken & Beautiful, released on April 10, 2007. It was featured on NBC's promo for the reality weight-loss show The Biggest Loser, as well as throughout season four of Beauty and the Geek. The song had debuted exclusively on "King Ben's Injection of Perfection" radio programme on 2RRR in Sydney, Australia, on September 9, 2006, to positive reaction. The single was also used as a fundraiser for Own the Podium for the 2010 Winter Olympics in Vancouver. The Olympic inspired video for "Believe" was recorded with the National Arts Centre Orchestra and released on September 17, 2007. The video stars Canadian Olympians Steve Omischl (freestyle skiing – aerials), Joannie Rochette (figure skating), and Clara Hughes (speed skating).

McNeil appeared on Matt Nathanson's album Some Mad Hope singing background vocals on the songs "Sooner Surrender" and "Bulletproof Weeks", and on Clay Aiken's album A Thousand Different Ways as guest vocalist on "I Want to Know What Love Is", a cover of the Foreigner song.

McNeil appeared as the character Oz in the Canadian production of "We Will Rock You" at the Canon Theater in Toronto until August 4, 2007.

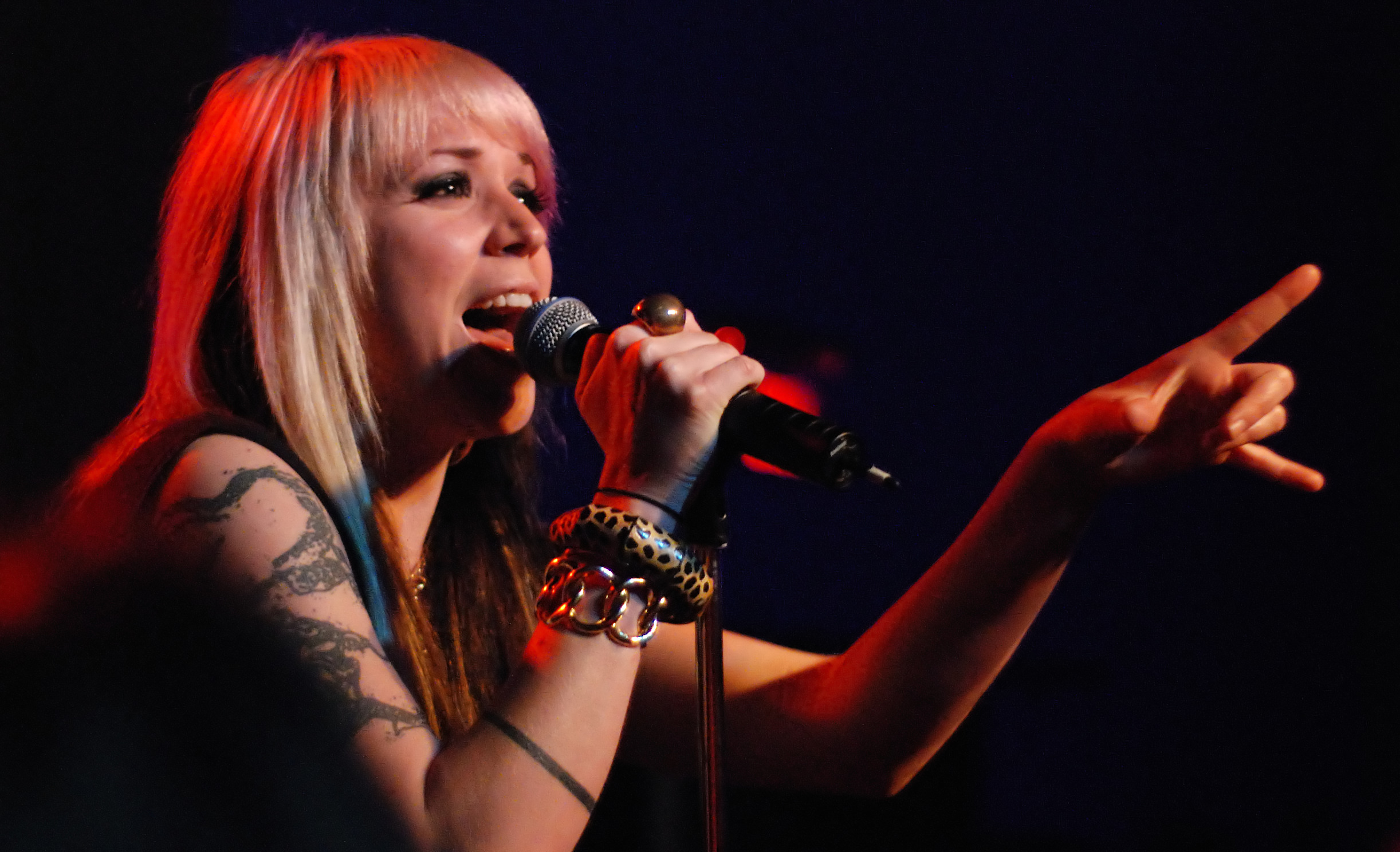
McNeil performing in December 2007

=== 2008—2010: Rock-N-Roller and Grey Cup ===
In March 2008, prior to her April tour, she held a contest for her fans across Canada to sing her hit single "Believe" and post it on her website; viewers then voted for the winner. In May 2008, McNeil released her third music video, "Lonely (Are You Coming Home?)". McNeil was one of the judges on the first four seasons of the children's Canadian reality TV show, The Next Star, on YTV, which premiered on July 18, 2008, and also recorded the theme song for the show, "Let's Go" which she performed on the show's first-season finale at Canada's Wonderland in Toronto on September 28, 2008.

On November 4, 2008, McNeil released her second solo album Rock-n-Roller which featured her latest Top 20 hit "Let's Go". Re-released as a deluxe edition in 2009, Rock n Roller: Reloaded spawned two singles, "Supergirl" and "Help Me Out". She performed during 96th Grey Cup halftime show broadcast live on November 23, 2008, along with Theory of a Deadman and Andrée Watters.

On March 28, 2009, McNeil headlined a concert held at Nathan Phillips Square in Toronto to celebrate WWF's Earth Hour.

In 2010, McNeil, an ex-smoker, appeared in commercials for Thrive lozenges a smoking cessation aid. She also appeared on Canadian Idol winner Brian Melo's second album The Truth in the duet "Story of Us" released in 2010.

=== 2011—2013: Dear Love and This Is Christmas ===
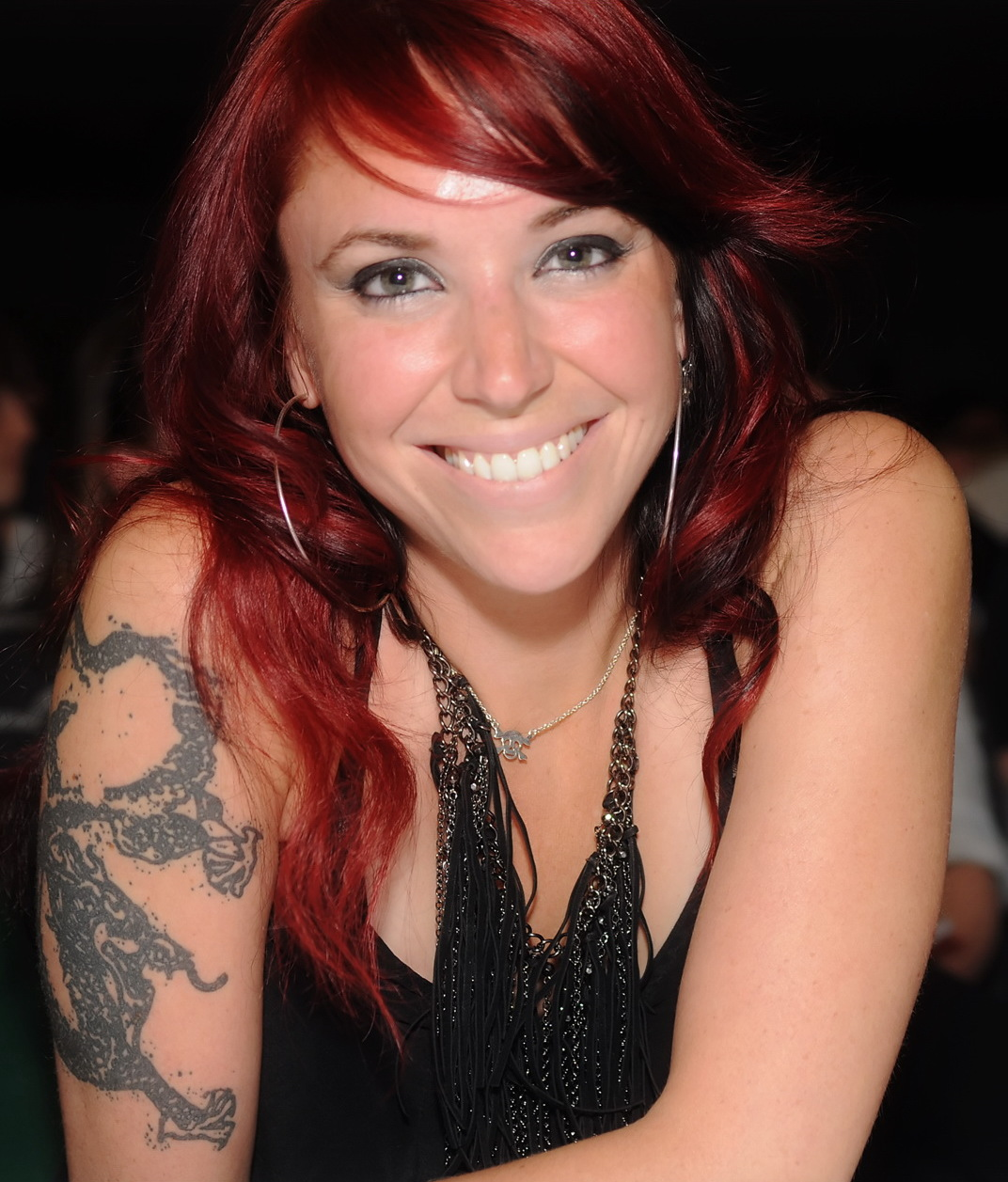
McNeil in 2012

McNeil began the Dear Love era on November 7, 2010, by releasing the first video Drama Queen Intervention 1 on her YouTube account. She released the Drama Queen lyric video on iTunes on March 15, 2011 and the official music video release on March 17 on YouTube. Nearly five months later, in July 2011, McNeil released the Merry Go Round lyric video on her YouTube account.

In February 2012 the album's third single "Tough Love" was released on radio. The single was released on iTunes On May 8. Dear Love, her third studio album was released August 7, 2012. On November 20, 2012, McNeil released a collection of Christmas songs, both covers and originals, on her album This is Christmas. During the promo tour, McNeil officially confirmed "Love Can't Save Us Now" as the official fourth single from the album Dear Love.

=== 2014—present: Fourth solo album and Loving Mary ===
In 2013, McNeil began working on a duo project with previous songwriting collaborator Marti Frederiksen, which was reportedly intended to follow in the style of American country trio Lady Antebellum. Instead, they teamed up with Grammy-winning country singer Rebecca Lynn Howard and songwriter Elisha Hoffman to form the band Loving Mary, which they envisioned as a sort of modern-day Fleetwood Mac. The group's sound has been described as a combination of Americana, country, and rock n' roll. An EP, Loving Mary – Live, was recorded and released in early 2015, while a full-length album is in the final stages of recording.

In addition to her work with the band, McNeil confirmed through her Twitter account that she is also working on a fourth solo album, which is "already written".

== Discography ==
=== Studio albums ===
Title	Details
Broken & Beautiful	Release date: April 10, 2007; Label: Curve Music
Rock-n-Roller	Release date: November 4, 2008; Label: Universal Music Canada
Dear Love	Release date: August 7, 2012; Label: 604 Records
Line 49	Release date: July 26, 2026; Label: Qster

=== EPs ===
- Live Acoustic (2010)
- This Is Christmas (2012)

=== Singles ===
Year	Single	Peak chart positions				Album
Year	Single	CAN	CAN AC	CAN CHR	CAN Hot AC	Album
2007	"Hung Up"	55	—	36	14	Broken & Beautiful
2007	"Believe"	61	20	—	12	Broken & Beautiful
2007	"Broken & Beautiful"	—	—	—	50	Broken & Beautiful
2008	"Lonely (Are You Coming Home?)"	—	—	—	—	Broken & Beautiful
2008	"Let's Go"	—	—	—	23	Rock-n-Roller (and Rock-n-Roller: Reloaded)
2009	"Supergirl"	26	—	29	3	Rock-n-Roller (and Rock-n-Roller: Reloaded)
2009	"Help Me Out"	—	—	44	13	Rock-n-Roller (and Rock-n-Roller: Reloaded)
2011	"Drama Queen"	96	—	—	23	Dear Love
2011	"Merry Go Round"	75	7	—	37	Dear Love
2012	"Tough Love"	—	23	—	34	Dear Love
2012	"Love Can't Save Us Now" (featuring Faber Drive)	—	25	—	—	Dear Love
2015	"The Best is Yet to Come"	—	34	—	—	Non-album single
"—" denotes releases that did not chart

=== Other charted songs ===
Year	Single	Peak chart positions		Album
Year	Single	CAN AC	CAN Hot AC	Album
2007	"Il Suffit D'y Croire"	49	—	Non-album song
2008	"It's Christmas Time"	26	—	A Canadian Christmas, Vol. 4
2009	"Don't Tell Me Goodbye"	—	34	Rock-n-Roller
2011	"For Christmas Time"	22	46	A 604 Records Christmas
2012	"This Is Christmas"	4	—	This Is Christmas
2012	"Santa (I'm Waiting for You)"	13	—	This Is Christmas
2012	"Silent Night"	17	—	This Is Christmas

=== Other appearances ===
Year	Title	Other artist(s)	Album	Notes
2005	"God's Top Ten"	INXS	Switch	Backing vocals
2006	"I Want to Know What Love Is"	Clay Aiken	A Thousand Different Ways	Featured artist
2006	"Anybody"	Jesse McCartney	Right Where You Want Me	Backing vocals
2007	"Bulletproof Weeks"	Matt Nathanson	Some Mad Hope	Backing vocals
2007	"Sooner Surrender"	Matt Nathanson	Some Mad Hope	Backing vocals
2009	?	Foreigner	Can't Slow Down	Backing vocals
2010	"Story of Us"	Brian Melo	The Truth	Featured artist
2011	"(It) Feels So Good"	Steven Tyler	—N/a	Backing vocals
2012	"Ain't Got No Home"	Garth Hudson	Chest Fever: A Canadian Tribute to the Band	Featured artist

== Awards and nominations ==
Year	Award	Nominated work	Result
2008	Juno Award for New Artist of the Year	Broken and Beautiful	Nominated
2008	Independent Music Award for Favourite Pop Artist	—N/a	Won
2008	Canadian Radio Music Award for Hot AC	"Hung Up"	Nominated
2008	Canadian Radio Music Award for AC	"Believe"	Nominated
