= You Ain't Down Home =

Single by Jann Browne

from the album Tell Me Why
- B-side: "I'll Never Grow Tired of You"
- Released: July 1, 1989
- Genre: Country
- Length: 3:42
- Label: Curb
- Songwriter(s): Jamie O'Hara
- Producer(s): Steve Fishell

Jann Browne singles chronology
"You Ain't Down Home" (1989)	"Tell Me Why" (1989)

"You Ain't Down Home" is a song written by Jamie O'Hara, and recorded by American country music artist Jann Browne. It was released in July 1989 as the first single from the album Tell Me Why. The song reached #19 on the Billboard Hot Country Singles & Tracks chart.

== Cover versions ==
- Julie Roberts covered the song for her 2004 self-titled album.

== Chart performance ==
Chart (1989)	Peak position
US Hot Country Songs (Billboard)	19
