= MCM – Gospel Reprise: A Few More Gems =

Gospel Reprise: A Few More Gems
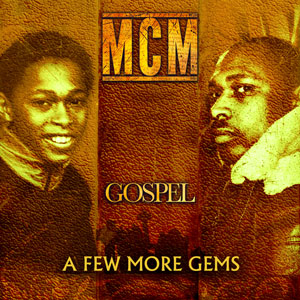
- EP Release Cover Artwork

EP by MCM
- Released: 23 April 2012
- Genre: Hip hop
- Length: 30:08 (digital release only)
- Label: I-innovate (UK)

MCM chronology
The Missing Gems of MCM Caveman (2011)	Gospel Reprise: A Few More Gems (2012)

Gospel Reprise: A Few More Gems is an EP by rapper MCM (Mark Layman), former front man for UK hip hop group Caveman. The EP was digitally released on 23 April 2012 to support the previous MCM album The Gospel: The Missing Gems of MCM Caveman (1994-2011). It features several unreleased songs from the 1990s era not found on the 2011 album.

== Background ==
Similar to the previous 2011 double album, the majority of tracks on the EP were originally recorded between 1994 and 2011. The EP also features the original complete versions of songs that were abbreviated and given intermission status on the Gospel album. These include Farther Forgive produced by DJ Nappa featuring Q Reppin known as Farther Forgive intermission on the original Gospel album and Live In Stereo featuring TY (Ben Chijioke) known on the Gospel album as TY Intro (skit). In addition, the EP consists of new instrumentals produced by MCM in 2011.

== Reception ==
The Gospel project generally received positive reviews from the hip-hop media in the UK, US and Europe.

"2-Hip (ukhh.com), MCM – The Gospel: The Missing Gems of MCM Caveman (I-innovate) May 2011"

" 'Still, it's all new material, so it couldn't be accused of sounding old to fans of Caveman. Hell, beats like "The Game" with a simple off-key piano loop and deep punchy kick drums, will have you nodding like an agreeable MP in the commons. This is no cheap student friendly imitation of how rap used to be, this is a guy with lots of experience and history repping on The Gospel as he did back on the Caveman classics from another time such as "I'm Ready". Does this have a place on your shelf? Absolutely!.".

== Track listing ==
Based on iTunes track listing
No.	Title	Length
1.	"Live in Stereo [Original Version]"" (feat. TY)	4:30
2.	"You Don't Stop" (feat. Q Reppin & Kool G)	3:43
3.	"Conscious Energy""	4:03
4.	"Father Forgive [Original Version] [Explicit]" (feat. Q Reppin & DJ Nappa)	4:29
5.	"Holy Reaction""	5:00
6.	"In the House [Explicit]"" (feat. TY & Smalley Small)	4:29
7.	"Ooh Right""	3:35
Total length:		30:08

== Credits and personnel ==
- MCM (Mark Layman) – Producer & Vocalist - Track(s) 1,3,5 & 7
- TY (Ben Chijioke) - Vocalist - Track(s) 1 & 6
- DJ Nappa - Producer - Track 3
- Q Reppin & Kool G - Vocalists - Track 2
- Smalley Small (Pete Small) - Vocalist - Track 6
- I-innovate Staff – I-innovate (UK) - Project Management
