= Tell Me Why (Wah Wah Collective song) =

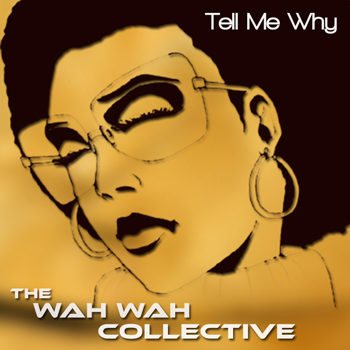

Single by The Wah Wah Collective

from the album Cry Baby Soul
- B-side: Gordo, Along The Ganges; (Vinyl Version)
- Released: New Version (November 2013); Original Version (March 2004)
- Recorded: January 2004 (Original Vocals)
- Genre: Nu jazz, neo soul
- Length: 4:06 (Radio Edit); 5:22 (Album Version)
- Label: I-innovate (UK)
- Songwriter(s): Fiona Faye
- Producer(s): George Eyo, Mel Glynn (Arranger) and Najero Okenabirhie

The Wah Wah Collective singles chronology
"Conceptual Love" (2010)	"Tell Me Why" (2013)

"Tell Me Why" is a song by British eclectic soul group The Wah Wah Collective. The original version was a vinyl only release in March 2004 on the Greasy Geezers label. A new remastered radio edit version of the song was circulated in late 2013 by I-innovate (UK) to support The Wah Wah Collective debut album Cry Baby Soul released 24 February 2014. To accompany the release of Cry Baby Soul, re-issued 12" vinyl versions of "Tell Me Why" were redistributed. The album Cry Baby Soul features the full length version.

== Background ==
Tell Me Why features Birmingham (UK) based soul, jazz vocalist Fiona Faye and was recorded within several Wah Wah jamming sessions in the early formation period of The Wah Wah Collective. Produced by Georgeyo with 'The Elusive' Najero Okenabirhie as Executive Producer.

== Critical reception ==
The 2013/14 version of Tell Me Why received a positive reception and extensive airplay on many specialist radio stations catering to the soul and funk genre throughout Europe, US and other countries. This prompted radio features and interviews for The Wah Wah Collective.

On magazine album reviews for Cry Baby Soul the song 'Tell Me Why' was highlighted as one of the most popular songs by The Wah Wah Collective.

== Track listing ==
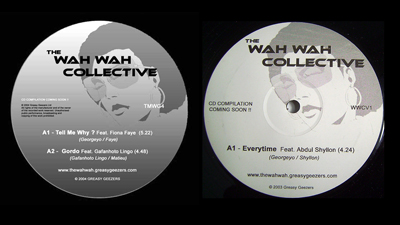
(Wah Wah Collective 12" Vinyl Labels) Tell Me Why and Everytime

=== 12" Vinyl Release ===
Side A
No.	Title	Length
1.	"Tell Me Why" (Original Version feat. Fiona Faye)	5:22
2.	"Gordo" (Original Version)	4:48

Side B
No.	Title	Length
1.	"Gordo" (Glynn Mix)	3:40
2.	"Tell Me Why" (Radio Edit)	4:06
3.	"Wah Rhapsody (Along The Ganges)" (12" Version)	1:53
Total length:		19:49

=== 2013 Digital Version ===
No.	Title	Length
1.	"Tell Me Why" (Radio Edit)	4:06

== Personnel ==
- Featured Artist: Fiona Faye (Fiona Spence-Reid)
- Software Programming: George Eyo, Najero Okenabirhie
- Keyboards: George Eyo
- Background vocals: George Eyo, Najero Okenabirhie
- Song Arrangement: George Eyo, Mel Glynn
- Executive Producer: Najero Okenabirhie
