= Broken & Beautiful =

Broken & Beautiful may refer to:

- Broken & Beautiful (Kate Alexa album), 2006
- Broken & Beautiful (Mark Schultz album), 2006
- Broken & Beautiful (Suzie McNeil album), 2007
- "Broken & Beautiful" (song), 2019, by Kelly Clarkson
