= Positive Reaction =

Positive Reaction may refer to:

- Positive Reaction (album), a 1990 album by Caveman
- Positive Reaction (song), a 1988 song by Mandy
