= Dear Love =

Dear Love may refer to:

- Dear Love (album), a 2012 album by Suzie McNeil
- Dear Love: A Beautiful Discord, a 2006 album by the Devil Wears Prada
- "Dear Love", a song from the 1965 musical Flora the Red Menace by Kander and Ebb
- Dear Ishq (lit. 'Dear Love'), a 2023 Indian soap opera
