= Supergirl (Saving Jane song) =

Single by Saving Jane

from the album SuperGirl
- Released: March 25, 2008
- Genre: Pop rock
- Length: 2:56
- Label: Toucan Cove
- Songwriter(s): Marti Dodson, Mats Valentin

Saving Jane singles chronology
| "One Girl Revolution" (2007) | "Supergirl" (2008) | "Breakin' Up is Hard to Do" (2008) |

"Supergirl" (sometimes stylized as "SuperGirl") is a song written by Marti Dodson and Mats Valentin and recorded by American rock band Saving Jane for their 2008 album of the same name. It was released as the album's lead single on March 25, 2008.

== Use in popular culture ==
During the summer of 2008, "SuperGirl" became the theme song of two prominent athletes, racecar driver Danica Patrick and Olympic Gold Medal gymnast Nastia Liukin.

== Commercial performance ==
The single entered the Billboard Pop 100, becoming the group's second entry after "Girl Next Door (2005)". On the chart dated June 21, 2008, the song debuted at number 95, becoming one of eighteen new entries that week. The track began slowly ascending the chart in June and July, entering the top 90 in its fifth week on, and eventually attaining a peak of number 85 on the chart dated August 2, 2008. It spent a total of eleven weeks in the top 100, exiting the chart at the end of August.

== Chart performance ==
| Chart (2008) | Peak position |
|---|---|
| US Pop 100 (Billboard) | 85 |
| US Pop Airplay (Billboard) | 40 |

== Suzie McNeil version ==
"Supergirl"

Single by Suzie McNeil

from the album Rock-n-Roller
- Released: March 24, 2009
- Genre: Pop rock
- Length: 2:54
- Label: Universal
- Songwriter(s): Marti Dodson, Mats Valentin
- Producer(s): Marti Frederiksen

Suzie McNeil singles chronology
| "Let's Go" (2008) | "Supergirl" (2009) | "Help Me Out" (2009) |

Music video
- "Supergirl" on YouTube

In 2009, Canadian pop rock singer Suzie McNeil recorded a cover of "Supergirl" for Rock-n-Roller: Reloaded (2009), the re-issue of her second studio album, Rock-n-Roller. It was released in Canada as the lead single for Rock-n-Roller: Reloaded (and second single from the album overall, following "Let's Go") on March 24, 2009, and internationally on August 18, 2009. "Supergirl" entered the Canadian Hot 100 at No. 80.

=== Music video ===
The video for "Supergirl" was directed by Carlos Lopez Estrada and premiered June 24, 2009 on McNeil's official YouTube channel. In it, McNeil portrays a vigilante-superheroine character who saves various men from compromising positions as well as performing with her band on a stage lit by multi-colored, nightclub-inspired lights.

=== Chart performance ===
==== Weekly charts ====
| Chart (2009) | Peak position |
|---|---|
| Canada (Canadian Hot 100) | 26 |
| Canada CHR/Top 40 (Billboard) | 29 |
| Canada Hot AC (Billboard) | 3 |

==== Year-end charts ====
| Chart (2009) | Peak position |
|---|---|
| Canadian Hot 100 (Billboard) | 97 |

=== Release history ===
| Country | Date | Format | Label |
|---|---|---|---|
| Canada | March 24, 2009 | Digital download | Universal |
| United States | August 18, 2009 | Digital download | Bit Productions |
| United Kingdom | August 18, 2009 | Digital download | Bit Productions |
