= Rock-n-Roller =

Studio album by Suzie McNeil
- Released: November 4, 2008
- Genre: Pop rock
- Length: 37:54
- Label: Universal Music Canada

Suzie McNeil chronology
Broken & Beautiful (2007)	Rock-n-Roller (2008)	Dear Love (2012)

Singles from Rock-n-Roller
- 1. "Let's Go" Released: August 5, 2008; 2. "Supergirl" Released: March 24, 2009; 3. "Help Me Out" Released: October 13, 2009

Rock-n-Roller: Reloaded

Rock-n-Roller (sometimes stylised Rock N' Roller) is the second album from Canadian singer-songwriter Suzie McNeil, released on November 4, 2008. It was reissued the following year as Rock-n-Roller: Reloaded to feature an additional song, a cover of Saving Jane's "Supergirl." Three singles released from the album, including the aforementioned "Supergirl", which became McNeil's most successful single to date when it peaked at No. 26 on the Canadian Hot 100.

== Critical reception ==
Professional ratings
Review scores
Source	Rating
Allmusic	3.5/5 stars
Metro Canada	2/5 stars

The album received mixed to positive reviews from music critics. Matthew Chisling from AllMusic labelled the album "almost as good" as Broken & Beautiful, explaining that in spite of Rock-n-Roller being generally "quite excellent", "the repetitiveness of some tracks limits their overall quality." The staff of Metro Canada gave a more negative review, describing the material as "sterile" and "so L.A." Ranking the album two stars out of five, the newspaper remarked that "this should be the kind of music that never goes out of style [...] But it only works if you have something new and special to offer."

== Track listing ==
No.	Title	Writer(s)	Length
1.	"Let's Go"	Suzie McNeil, Marti Frederiksen	3:04
2.	"I Wanna Know"	McNeil, Frederiksen	3:12
3.	"Don't Tell Me Goodbye"	McNeil, Frederiksen, Jason Paige	3:50
4.	"Rock-N-Roller"	McNeil, Frederiksen	4:04
5.	"Fast Lane"	Frederiksen, Kara DioGuardi	3:06
6.	"Believe" (New Mix)	Frederiksen, DioGuardi	3:44
7.	"For You"	McNeil, Frederiksen	3:33
8.	"Free"	McNeil, Frederiksen	3:01
9.	"Help Me Out"	Holly Knight, Charles E. Kaufman, Frederiksen	4:03
10.	"Naturally"	McNeil, Frederiksen, Paige, Russ Irwin	3:33
11.	"What Ur Getting Into"	Frederiksen, Shannon Curfman	3:00

Rock-N-Roller: Reloaded bonus track
No.	Title	Writer(s)	Length
12.	"Supergirl"	Marti Dodson, Mats Valentin	2:53

== Charts ==
=== Singles ===
Year	Single	Peak chart positions		
Year	Single	CAN	CAN CHR	CAN Hot AC
2008	"Let's Go"	—	—	—
2009	"Supergirl"	26	31	3
2009	"Help Me Out"	—	—	27
"—" denotes releases that did not chart

== Credits and personnel ==
=== General ===
Executive Producer – Bits Productions
Produced by Marti Frederiksen for Poppy Productions

Tracks 1, 3, 7, 8, 10 mixed by Brian Paturalski for Red Room Studios
Tracks 6 and 11 mixed by Marti Frederiksen
Tracks 2, 4, 5, and 8 mixed by Marti Frederiksen & Brian Paturalski

Additional production and recording on tracks 3 and 10 by Jason Paige
Additional engineering on tracks 9 and 11 by Johnny Coppollino

Mastered by David Donnelly at DNA Mastering

=== Track by track ===
- "Let's Go" – Vocals & background vocals – Suzie McNeil; Guitars, Bass, Keys, Percussion - Marti Frederiksen; Drums – Ryan Brown
- "I Wanna Know" – Vocals & background vocals – Suzie McNeil; Guitar, Bass, Keys, Percussion, BG Vocal - Marti Frederiksen; Strings – Eliza James; Sax – Alex Budman
- "Don't Tell Me Goodbye" – Vocals – Suzie McNeil; Background Vocals – Suzie McNeil, Jason Paige, Marti Frederiksen, Scott Walters; Guitar, Bass, Keys - Jason Paige; Drums – Ryan Brown
- "Fast Lane" – Vocals & background vocals – Suzie McNeil; Guitars, Bass, Keys - Marti Frederiksen; Drums – Ryan Brown
- "Believe" – Vocals – Suzie McNeil; Piano – Russ Irwin; Strings – Eliza James; Guitar – Marti Frederiksen
- "For You" – Vocals & background vocals – Suzie McNeil; Guitars, Bass, Percussion - Marti Frederiksen; Drums, Glochenspiel – Ryan Brown; Piano – Jason Paige
- "Free" – Vocals & background vocals – Suzie McNeil; Guitars, Bass, Keys, Percussion - Marti Frederiksen; Drums – Ryan Brown
- "Help Me Out" – Vocals & background vocals – Suzie McNeil; Guitars, Bass, - Marti Frederiksen; Drums – Ryan Brown; Keys – Holly Knight
- "Naturally" – Vocals – Suzie McNeil; Background Vocals – Suzie McNeil, Jason Paige; Bass – Marti Frederiksen; Guitar, Keys - Jason Paige; Drums – Ryan Brown; Strings – Eliza James; Trumpets – Gabriel Johnson
- "What Ur Getting Into" – Vocals – Suzie McNeil; Background Vocals – Suzie McNeil, Marti Frederiksen; Drums, Guitar, Bass, Keys, Percussion - Marti Frederiksen
