= Dear Love (album) =

Studio album by Suzie McNeil
- Released: July 24, 2012
- Genre: Pop rock
- Length: 38:28
- Label: 604 Records
- Producer: Marti Frederiksen; Zubin Thakkar; Josh Ramsay; Tawgs Salter

Suzie McNeil chronology
Rock-n-Roller (2008)	Dear Love (2012)

Singles from Dear Love
- 1. "Drama Queen" Released: February 11, 2011; 2. "Merry Go Round" Released: July 19, 2011; 3. "Tough Love" Released: May 8, 2012; 4. "Love Can't Save Us Now" Released: December 2012

Dear Love is the third studio album by Canadian singer-songwriter Suzie McNeil, released on July 24, 2012 through 604 Records. It has spawned four singles, including the top 10 Canada AC hit "Merry Go Round" and the Faber Drive duet "Love Can't Save Us Now". According to McNeil, the album "tells the story of [her] journey into love [and] loss," and lyrically, the songs revolve around the themes of heartbreak and recovery.

== Critical reception ==
The Calgary Herald's review gave the album three stars out of five, with critic Eric Volmers explaining that "Dear Love works because it has all of the trappings of a shameless, radio-grabbing pop album. Immaculate production, airplay-friendly hooks, semi-cool ’80s cover (The Eurythmics’ Here Comes the Rain Again) and even some celeb musical guests... is the formula here." On McNeil herself, Volmers elaborated that she "has a powerful voice and a nice way of surrounding her hooks with memorable melodies."

In a similar vein, Real Style Network's review felt that "on paper, [McNeil] has everything you need, but there is something missing on the album. It is well done, but forgettable." Despite indicating that McNeil was "playing it safe" on the album, the review praised her "versatile" vocals which "[allow] her to be sweet as sugar or edgy and tough," and deemed the song's generally "catchy, sometimes being reminiscent of a more subtle Katy Perry."

== Track listing ==
No.	Title	Writer(s)	Producer	Length
1.	"Intro"	Suzie McNeil, Zubin Thakkar		0:52
2.	"Dear Love"	Kara DioGuardi, Marti Frederiksen	Frederiksen	3:55
3.	"Heartbeat"	McNeil, Marti Dodson, Thakkar	Thakkar	3:05
4.	"Drama Queen"	McNeil, Josh Ramsay	Ramsay	2:52
5.	"Merry Go Round"	McNeil, Ryan Stewart, Thakkar	Thomas "Tawgs" Salter	3:33
6.	"Love Can't Save Us Now" (featuring Faber Drive)	Dodson, Mats Valentin	Salter	3:07
7.	"One Foot in Front of the Other"	McNeil, Justin Forsley	Salter	3:25
8.	"Interlude"	McNeil		0:16
9.	"Here Comes the Rain Again"	Annie Lennox, David A. Stewart	Salter	3:28
10.	"Tough Love" (featuring Anami Vice)	McNeil, Ramsay	Ramsay	3:35
11.	"In Luv Tonight"	McNeil, R. Stewart	Salter	3:29
12.	"Blessing in Disguise"	McNeil, Salter	Salter	3:13
13.	"Merry Go Round" (Acoustic)	McNeil, R. Stewart	Thakkar	3:11
Total length:				38:28

iTunes bonus track
No.	Title	Length
14.	"Stay"	3:23
Total length:		41:53

== Chart performance ==
=== Singles ===
Year	Single	Peak chart positions		
Year	Single	CAN	CAN AC	CAN Hot AC
2011	"Drama Queen"	96	—	23
2011	"Merry Go Round"	75	8	38
2012	"Tough Love"	—	25	38
2012	"Love Can't Save Us Now"	—	15	—

== Release history ==
Country	Date	Format	Label
Worldwide	July 24, 2012	CD	604 Records
Canada	August 7, 2012	Digital download	604 Records
United States	August 7, 2012	Digital download	604 Records
