= The Wah Wah Collective =

British music group

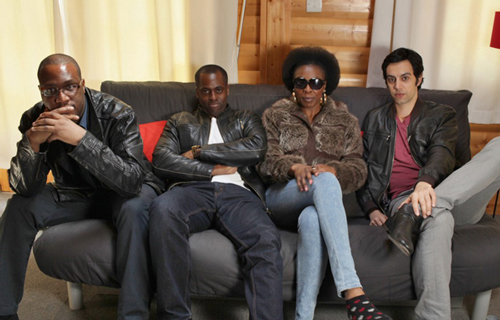
- Band Members (left to right); Najero Okenabirhie (The Elusive), George Eyo, Sanya Lerin, Mathieu Karsenti

Background information
- Origin: London, England
- Genres: Nu jazz Neo soul Alternative R&B; Alternative dance Alternative hip hop
- Years active: 2001–2005, 2009–Present
- Labels: Greasy Geezers, I-innovate (UK)
- Members: Georgeyo; Mathieu Karsenti; Najero Okenabirhie; Sanya Lerin
- Website: wahwah.let-i-innovate.com

"The Wah Wah Collective" were a British, initially a London-based neo-soul underground music group, who released vinyl-only EPs and singles in the mid 2000s. The music group gained notoriety for their mixture of neo-soul, nu-jazz, Latin grooves with alternative dance. In more recent years the band have described their music as 'Eclectic Soul'. The Wah Wah Collective founding members were George Eyo and Najero Okenabirhire (The Elusive). The Wah Wah Collective were on the Greasy Geezers imprint label distributed by Kudos Records, Discograpgh (France), Goya and Pinnacle. The Greasy Geezers label was the creation of Najero Okenabirhie who previously worked with Sanctuary Music Management. The sister arm of the Wah Wah Collective were a Latin /acoustic based group called Gafanhoto Lingo an additional project created by The Wah Wah Collective founding members. Gafanhoto Lingo were accompanied by songwriter/ guitarist Mathieu Karsenti.

== Critical reception ==
The Wah Wah Collective were warmly received by the UK underground urban media in the mid 2000s. Wah Wah releases were often reviewed by genre leading UK publications.

"Pete Mclntyre, IDJ Magazine – R&B Soul Tunes Review, March 2004"

" 'London's Wah Wah Collective under the guidance of veteran producer Georgeyo hit playdirt with this superb double-header. 'Tell Me Why' is a superb late night slinky groove featuring the feline purr of vocalist Fiona Faye; Flip-over to 'Gordo' for a breezy Cuban influenced dancer guaranteed to get you moving. Excellent.".

"Dom Servini, Straight No Chaser – Singles Review, Spring 2004"

" 'Not to be confused with the record label with the same name, The Wah Wah Collective come through with their second 12" release, and it's the best so far. Fiona Faye's vocals fit really nicely in to this downtempo jazz ditty with its tender fender rhodes and soulful strings. Perfect after-hours listening".

"Matilda Egere-Cooper, Blues & Soul Magazine – Singles Review, April 2004"

"'This is R&B jazz well done. Producer Georgeyo has built up an impressive track record over the last few years, and the track offers a snapshot of his predominantly jazz sound, with other styles sneaking in here and there. Track number two 'Gordo', provides more of an earthly vibrant percussive vibe-straight out of Cuba – and where 'Tell Me Why' whispers 'sun-down', this one is sunny Balearic beach bar music. If that's your thing. You'll dig it. (Verdict : Smooth soul vibrations for the sophisticated set)".

== Radio reception ==
Several titles from the Wah Wah Collective roster were supported with UK National Radio airplay on shows such as Rosie Kendrick (Late Lounge) (Smooth 102.2 FM), Patrick Forge (The Cosmic Jam – Kiss 100 FM) and also on US radio with pioneering groove jazz radio DJ Rafe Gomez who hosted the nationally syndicated radio show "The Groove Boutique" from 2003 through to 2008.

== The mid-2000s ==
After releasing several tiles on vinyl the music group decided to venture in to different projects. Georgeyo set up another left field group called Stark (Futuristica Music). Najero left the band and set up I-innovate Communications a video production / indie label. I-innovate (UK) who maintained ownership of the Greasy Geezers label roster and music archive. Greasy Geezers the imprint was disbanded and turned in to a dance production house under the I-innovate (UK) label.

Mathieu Karsenti former guitarist/vocalist for Gafanhoto Lingo went on to set up the production and composing company Intricuts music focusing on music compositions for TV, film, theatre and multimedia. Notable clients were the Britain's Got Talent, Series 3 (ITV, 2009) winners Diversity and BBC Children in Need.

== 2010 onwards ==
I-innovate (UK) used The Wah Wah Collective archive to resample and release a single by performer Bada Badoo from X-Factor, UK series 7 (ITV/SYCO, 2010). Conceptual Love was based on the unreleased Wah Wah Collective song 'Quartet Junkie'. A future Wah Wah Collective album was planned to be released by I-innovate (UK) showcasing unreleased material and digitally re-mastered versions of their original vinyl releases over the last ten years with additional contributions from affiliated artists.

Cry Baby Soul the long-awaited debut album by The Wah Wah Collective was released on 24 February 2014 showcasing remastered versions of previous releases alongside new recordings. The digital release was accompanied by vinyl re-issues.

== Promotion ==
From September 2012, The Wah Wah Collective released rare groove hip hop based tasters to support their forthcoming album Cry Baby Soul. The tasters supported an 'eclectic soul' theme later found on the album.

In August 2013, wah wah promo material 'You Are Somebody (Eternal Inspiration)' featured on the US/San Francisco based compilation 'Earwax ZipTape Delta' (Allied Forces Press).

In 2014, The Wah Wah Collective twitter brand @thewahmama was nominated for The 2013 Shorty Awards for Best Social Media Campaign.

== Discography ==
=== Singles and EPs ===
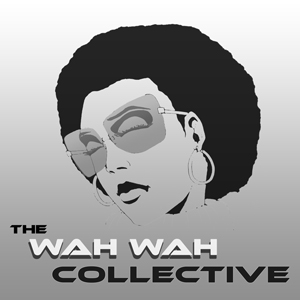
Vinyl Artwork

- "Everytime" (Greasy Geezers, vinyl re-issue 2014)
- "Prying Eyes" (Greasy Geezers, vinyl re-issue 2014)
- "Tell Me Why" (I-innovate (UK), 2004–13)
- "Gordo" (Greasy Geezers, vinyl re-issue 2014)
- "Life on Your Mind" (Gafanhoto Lingo) (Greasy Geezers, 2004)

=== Albums ===
- Cry Baby Soul (I-innovate (UK), 2014)
