= It Only Hurts When I Laugh (album) =

Studio album by Jann Browne
- Released: April 23, 1991
- Genre: Country
- Label: Curb
- Producer: Steve Fishell

Jann Browne chronology
Tell Me Why (1990)	It Only Hurts When I Laugh (1991)	Count Me In (1995)

Professional ratings
Review scores
Source	Rating
Allmusic	4.5/5 stars

It Only Hurts When I Laugh is the second album by Jann Browne. Among its highlights are a cover of Nanci Griffith's "I Wish It Would Rain," the title song "It Only Hurts When I Laugh" (penned by Kostas and Marty Stuart), "Where the Sidewalk Ends" (later recorded by George Strait for the soundtrack to his acting debut in the motion picture, Pure Country), and the old country standard "My Shoes Keep Walking Back to You."

== Track listing ==
1. "Better Love Next Time" (Gail Davies, Paul Kennerley) – 2:54
2. "I Wish It Would Rain" (Nanci Griffith) – 3:01
3. "It Only Hurts When I Laugh" (Kostas, Marty Stuart) – 2:35
4. "I Knew Enough to Fall in Love with You" (Gary Nicholson, Hank DeVito) – 3:18
5. "Blue Heart in Memphis" (Jann Browne, Pat Gallagher) – 3:38
6. "My Shoes Keep Walking Back to You" (Lee Ross, Bob Wills) – 2:55
7. "Who's Gonna Be Your Next Love" (Browne, Gallagher) – 2:42
8. "I Don't Do Floors" (Don Cook, Chick Rains) – 2:59
9. "Where the Sidewalk Ends" (Jim Lauderdale, John Leventhal) – 3:21
10. "Where Nobody Knows My Name" (John Hiatt, Jimmy Tittle) – 5:05
