= Cry Baby Soul =

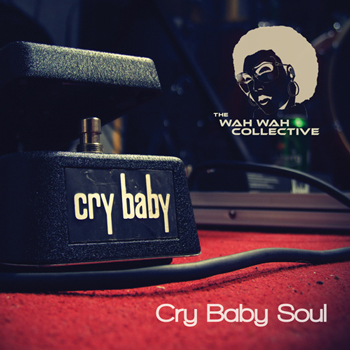

Studio album by The Wah Wah Collective
- Released: February 24, 2014
- Recorded: 2003–2013
- Studios: London; Big Game Studios, Italy
- Genres: Neo soul, acid jazz, nu jazz, Alternative R&B, electronica, Alternative dance
- Length: 63:57
- Label: I-innovate (UK)
- Producers: Georgeyo, Najero Okenabirhie, Mathieu Karsenti

Singles from Cry Baby Soul
- 1. "Tell Me Why / Gordo (12" vinyl)" Released: 2014; 2. "Everytime / Prying Eyes (12" vinyl)" Released: 2014

Cry Baby Soul is the debut studio album by British eclectic soul group The Wah Wah Collective. Released digitally on 24 February 2014 on I-innovate (UK), the multi-genre album covering neo soul, R&B, nu jazz, electronica, hip hop and breakbeat was accompanied by re-issued vinyl releases. The album featured a variety of songs often with guest vocalists. The album was the first release by The Wah Wah Collective in over 7 years and showcased an eclectic theme, a variation of different musical genres, played alongside the Fender Rhodes bass sound.

== Background ==
Cry Baby Soul features updated and re-mastered versions of their original vinyl releases alongside new material. Featured artists on the album included Fiona Faye, Natasha Stark, Abdul Shyllon, Bada Badoo and Saba Injera Soul. The Wah Wah founding members 'Georgeyo' and Najero Okenabirhie 'The Elusive' alongside Mathieu Karsenti provided author and composer credits on the album with additional post production support provided by Sanya Lerin and The Andrea Duo at Big Game Studios (Jesi, Italy).

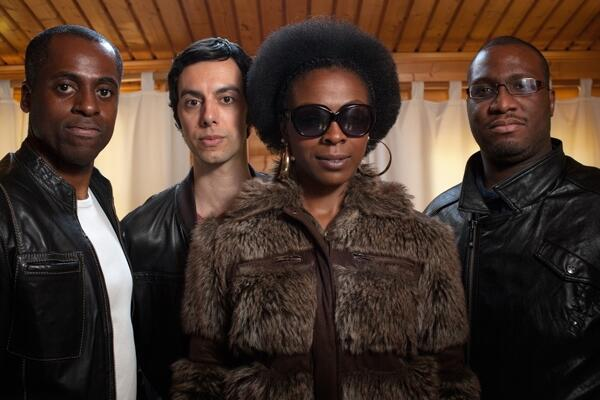
Band Members (left to right) George Eyo, Mathieu Karsenti, Sanya Lerin, Najero Okenabirhie (The Elusive)

The album title Cry Baby Soul is in reference to the Wah Wah 'Cry Baby' pedal brand as depicted on the album illustration by Rob Cheatley. Generally associated with guitar sound alteration the band utilized the wah wah pedal with Fender Rhodes bass chords throughout the album. The album was recorded in various band sessions between Summer 2003 and October 2013. Within this period band members also pursued other external music projects. On a special one-hour radio interview with DJ Dug Chant on Sound Fusion Radio band members ‘The Elusive’ and ‘Sanya Lerin’ described the album's musical style as ‘Eclectic Soul’ composed of many musical genres. In an interview with Love Music Magazine band member 'George Eyo' described the long overdue album as 'unfinished business' and 'The Elusive' stated that the growth of digital radio was a reason for completing the album as a digital release. On American Blog Talk Radio with Epiphany Castro 'The Elusive' described how the diversity of the band's background made their music suitable for different radio stations contributing to the album's theme of 'Eclectic Soul'.

== Promotion ==
Promotion for the album began in August 2012, with rare groove tasters being circulated amongst specialist radio stations, DJ's and new media.

In 2014 The Wah Wah Collective Twitter brand @thewahmama was nominated for The 2013 Shorty Awards for Best Social Media Campaign.

== Critical reception ==
Cry Baby Soul received positive reviews within specialist publications supporting dance, soul and black urban music in the UK and US.

"Soulm8 Magazine (UK), 'Cross The Track' Album Review, March 2014"

" This album is a result of pure dedication and a real love of soul music. One for the connoisseurs and those who want a sample of what proper soul is all about."

"L3 Magazine (US), Album Review - Spring 2014"

" ‘There is nothing like sitting with your friends and family at a beautiful lounge with a glass of wine in one hand, and the soothing audio of neo-soul from the Wah Wah Collective in the other hand!.. This is a must have album for lovers of Soul."

The Wah Wah Collective became featured artists on several radio stations in the UK and France. Several songs from the album such as 'Tell Me Why' and 'Gordo' received positive recognition from specialist stations in the US. Other songs from the album achieved airplay rotation on both sides of the Atlantic leading to special features and interviews on US radio shows and magazines.

== Track listing ==
No.	Title	Writer(s)	Length
1.	"Tell Me Why (Original Version) (feat. Fiona Faye)"	Fiona Faye, George Eyo, Najero Okenabirhie	5:22
2.	"Everytime (feat. Abdul Shyllon)"	Abdul Shyllon, George Eyo, Najero Okenabirhie	4:22
3.	"Show Me Your Friends, And I’ll Tell You Who You Are"	Najero Okenabirhie	2:16
4.	"Return of the Renegade"	Najero Okenabirhie, Christine Corinaldesi, Andrea Quaresima, Andrea Rossi, Lu Lu Gee	4:06
5.	"Carousel"	George Eyo	3:57
6.	"Conceptual Love (Wah Mama Mix)(feat. Baba Badoo)"	Baddar Chowdhry, Sanya Ogunlade, George Eyo, Andrea Quaresima, Andrea Rossi, Najero Okenabirhie	3:32
7.	"Sweet As Cherry"	George Eyo	2:29
8.	"Prying Eyes (pt 1&2) (feat. Angiee)"	Angiee Edozie, George Eyo, Najero Okenabirhie	7:20
9.	"Pure Love (feat. Saba injeraSoul)"	Mathieu Karsenti, Saba Tewelde	4:24
10.	"Feliz"	Mathieu Karsenti, George Eyo, Najero Okenabirhie	4:21
11.	"Gordo (Wah Mama Mix)"	Mathieu Karsenti, George Eyo, Najero Okenabirhie, Mel Glynn	3:26
12.	"Life On Your Mind"	Mathieu Karsenti, George Eyo, Najero Okenabirhie	4:22
13.	"Along The Ganges"	George Eyo, Najero Okenabirhie	3:06
14.	"Narita For Tokyo (feat. Natasha Stark)"	Natasha Stark, George Eyo, Najero Okenabirhie	3:28
15.	"Kyoto (pt 1 & 2)"	George Eyo	4:49
16.	"Conceptual Love (Original Version) (feat. Baba Badoo)"	Baddar Chowdhry, Mel Glynn, George Eyo, Najero Okenabirhie	3:29
Total length:			63:57

- Promo(s)

1. "You Are Somebody (Eternal Inspiration)" - 3:34 (featured on Earwax Ziptape Delta, by Allied Forces Press)
2. "Rock The Wah Wah (Eclectic Soul)" - 2:50

== Album Personnel ==
- Vocals: Mathieu Karsenti, Najero Okenabirhie, George Eyo
- Featured Artists: Fiona Faye, Saba Injera Soul, Abdul Shyllon, Bada Badoo, Natasha Stark
- Software Programming: George Eyo, Najero Okenabirhie
- Percussion: Mathieu Karsenti, George Eyo
- Guitar: Mathieu Karsenti
- Keyboards: George Eyo, Mathieu Karsenti
- Background vocals: Sanya Lerin, Mathieu Karsenti, George Eyo, Christine Corinaldesi, Lu Lu Gee
- Song Arrangement: George Eyo, Najero Okenabirhie
- Executive Producer: Najero Okenabirhie
- Post Production: Andrea Rossi, Andrea Quaresima, Najero Okenabirhie
