= Greasy Geezers =

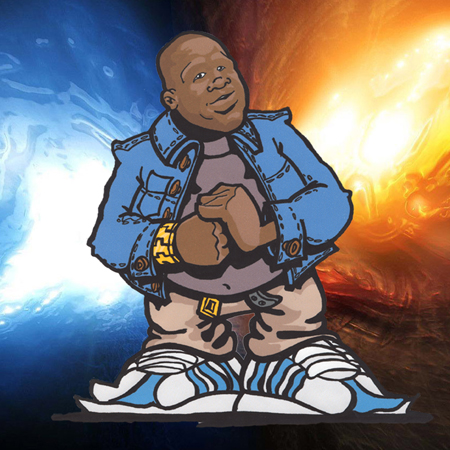
- Greasy Man Artwork / Solomon Vanguard

Background information
- Origin: London
- Genres: Dance, electro, pop, grime, comedy
- Years active: 2002–2006 (label), 2009–present (dance group)
- Labels: Greasy Geezers, I-innovate (UK)
- Members: The Greasy Man; Videoface; Bada Badoo; The Greasy Movement
- Website: greasygeezers.let-i-innovate.com

"Greasy Geezers" are a dance production unit based in East London whose production portfolio covers commercial urban/pop, electro dance, hip-hop and go-go (DC) remakes. The group is composed of producers and songwriters whose backgrounds include working with Sanctuary Music Management, Trinity Records and Sacred Records.

Greasy Geezers the name originates from the actual title of a record label established in 2002 by Najero Okenabirhie (previously working for Sanctuary Music Management on accountancy projects for Iron Maiden and Bruce Dickinson). This imprint label focused predominantly on garage releases. Most notable were releases presented by DJ Iron 'Some Good Garage EP'. As the garage scene waned the label diversified and changed their roster becoming a nu-jazz down tempo entity. Greasy Geezers adapted to the new market with releases by neo-soul and Latin house acts such as the Wah Wah Collective and Gafanhoto Lingo. The soulful diversification proved successful and the Wah Wah Collective gained notoriety in leading UK soul magazines with releases on playlists at Kiss FM (Patrick Forge), BBC Radio 1 (Giles Peterson), Smooth FM (Rosie Kendrick) and in the US with Rafe Gomez, dj/host of the nationally syndicated jazz mix show "The Groove Boutique".

== The Mid 00s ==
Greasy Geezers "The Label" was disbanded in 2008 coinciding with the liquidation of Goya and Pinnacle distribution who held all stock titles by the label. The label catalogue and copyrights were then transferred and held by new indie label I-innovate (UK) who prior to the event were a video production group.

== 2009 onwards ==
I-innovate (UK) in 2009 created the dance production unit called Greasy Geezers "The Dance Group" now composed of several dance producers including a team called Videoface previously from Trinity Records who gained notoriety in the soulful dance scene with the Norman Jay "Half is Mine" single (2005). In September 2010 The Wah Wah branch of the Greasy Geezers produced the single "Conceptual Love" by I-innovate artist Bada Badoo from X-factor (Season 7, ITV/SYCO UK).

From 2011 Greasy Geezers embarked on several dance remake projects starting with an adaptation of a 1990 UK hip hop single 'Fry You Like Fish' originally performed by Caveman. This original track is rooted in the UK hip hop scene and was originally supported by Tim Westwood. A new 2011 electro adaptation called Fry You Like Fish @ The Jam was released in October 2011. Greasy Geezers working with screen writers from I-innovate created viral online characters including 'the greasy geezer' who provides comedic short-films supporting their dance releases. The Greasy Geezers brand is the balance between entertainment and creative dance music adaptations with a secondary emphasis to provide a comedic perspective on UK urban life within the music scene.

In April 2012 Greasy Geezers released a revival garage digital ep Greasy Geezers Revival Jubilee. The ep featured various artists with the main song Elizabeth themed around the diamond Jubilee celebrations of Queen Elizabeth II.

== Discography ==
=== Greasy Geezers 'The Label' – Vinyl Singles and EPs ===
- "Some Good Garage EP" (DJ Iron & Chino Presents, 2003)
- "Just Bounce" (Thunder & Flow, 2003)
- "Music Hitz Da Spot" (Hekcentrik, 2003)
- "Wild Wild West" (Thunder & Flow, 2004) (Promo)

=== Greasy Geezers 'The Artist' – Singles ===
- "Fry You Like Fish @ The Jam" (Feat. Caveman) (2011)
- "Greasy Geezers Revival Jubilee EP" (Feat. Various Artists) (2012)
