= Girl Next Door (Saving Jane album) =

Studio album by Saving Jane
- Released: October 11, 2005
- Recorded: 2004–2006
- Genre: Pop rock, power pop, alternative rock
- Label: Madacy, Universal

Saving Jane chronology
Something to Hold Onto (2002)	Girl Next Door (2005)	One Girl Revolution (2007)

Girl Next Door is the second album by American pop rock group Saving Jane. The album was originally released on October 11, 2005 through Madacy Entertainment. On April 11, 2006, the album was remastered with a louder & rockier sound and re-released through Universal Records. The title track went on to sell over 100,000 copies and became the most successful single for the group.

== Track listing ==
=== Original Version ===
1. "Girl Next Door"
2. "Happy"
3. "Who's Cryin' Now?"
4. "Autumn & Me"
5. "Change You"
6. "Reasons Why"
7. "Come Down to Me"
8. "Don't Stop"
9. "Imperfection"

=== Artist Choice Version ===
1. Girl Next Door
2. Who's Cryin' Now
3. The Pretender (Cover. Original by Jackson Browne)
4. Grace (Bonus Track)
5. Imperfection
6. Happy
7. Don't Stop
8. Come Down to Me
9. Ordinary
10. Reasons Why
11. Sleep On It
12. Mary
13. Autumn & Me
14. You Say (Acoustic)
15. Girl Next Door (CBus Artist Choice Version) (Bonus Track)
16. Girl Next Door (Organic Artist Choice Version) (Bonus Track)

=== Re-release Version ===
1. "Who's Cryin' Now?"
2. "Happy"
3. "Girl Next Door"
4. "Imperfection"
5. "Reasons Why"
6. "Ordinary"
7. "Sleep On It"
8. "Don't Stop"
9. "The Pretender"
10. "Mary"
11. "Come Down to Me"
12. "Autumn & Me"
13. "You Say" (hidden track)
14. "Girl Next Door" (Acoustic) (iTunes Bonus Track)

== Charts ==
Chart (2006)	Peak position
U.S. Billboard 200	133
U.S. Billboard Heatseekers	2
