= Believe (Suzie McNeil song) =

Single by Suzie McNeil

from the album Broken & Beautiful
- Released: September 2006 (Original recording); September 17, 2007 (Olympic Inspired version)
- Recorded: 2004–2005
- Genre: Pop rock, symphonic rock
- Length: 3:41
- Label: Curve / Universal
- Songwriters: Kara DioGuardi, Marti Frederiksen
- Producer: Marti Frederiksen

Suzie McNeil singles chronology
"Hung Up" (2007)	"Believe" (2006)	"Broken & Beautiful" (2007)

Music video
- "Believe" (Olympic Inspired) on YouTube

"Believe" is a song written by Kara DioGuardi and Marti Frederiksen and famously recorded by Canadian singer-songwriter Suzie McNeil for her debut studio album, Broken & Beautiful (2007). It was first released to digital retailers in September 2006, while "Hung Up" was serviced to radio as the official lead single. The song was re-recorded with the National Arts Centre Orchestra in support of Canada's Own the Podium campaign, and served as the official anthem of the Canadian team for the 2010 Winter Olympics. The "Olympic Inspired" version of the song, released September 17, 2007, served as the album's second single. An alternate version is also included on McNeil's second album, Rock-n-Roller (2008).

A moderate commercial success, "Believe" entered the Canadian Hot 100 at number 81, and peaked at number 61. The song was more well-received critically, being highlighted as a standout track from the album by critics including AllMusic's Matthew Chisling, and is one of the songs for which McNeil is best known.

== Critical reception ==
Matthew Chisling of AllMusic as the "true highlight" of Broken & Beautiful, noting that it is "an emotionally powerful ballad anthem" and a "true display of McNeil's talents as a pop vocalist."

== Usage in media ==
"Believe" was used as a theme for American reality television program The Biggest Loser. It has also been featured on the television shows Beauty and the Geek, The Hills, and Oprah Winfrey's The Big Give.

== Music video ==
The video for the Olympic Inspired version of "Believe" was released September 17, 2007 in partnership with Bell Media. It showcases Canadian Olympic athletes Steve Omischl (freestyle skiing – aerials), Joannie Rochette (figure skating), and Clara Hughes (speed skating) training for their respective sports.

== Credits and personnel ==
Credits are adapted from liner notes of Broken & Beautiful and Rock-n-Roller.

- Suzie McNeil – lead vocals, background vocals
- Marti Frederiksen – producer, writer, programming, mixing, acoustic guitar, electric guitar
- Kara DioGuardi – writer
- Brian Paturalski – mixing, engineering, guitar, strings
- PK Pandey – engineering
- Russ Irwin – Hammond organ, piano
- Eliza James – strings
- Dave Pierce – conductor, orchestral arrangement
- John Shipp – engineering
- Dave Donnelly – mastering

== Chart performance ==
"Believe" entered the Billboard Canadian Hot 100 at number 81 for the week ending August 11, 2007.

Chart (2007)	Peak position
Canada Hot 100 (Billboard)	61
Canada AC (Billboard)	20
Canada Hot AC (Billboard)	12

== Awards and nominations ==
Year	Award	Result
2008	Canadian Radio Music Award for AC	Nominated
