= Greasy Geezers Revival Jubilee =

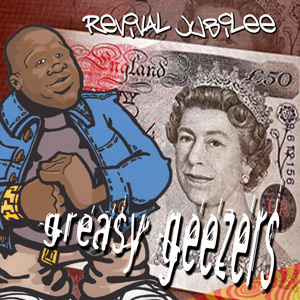
- Release Cover Artwork

Single by Greasy Geezers featuring Various Artists
- Released: 16 April 2012
- Genre: Electro, pop, hip hop, UK Garage
- Length: 19:22 (Various Artists)
- Label: I-innovate (UK)
- Songwriter(s): Chino, Skalza, Smoove, Hekcentrik, Mel Glynn, Gareth Glynn, Thunder & Flow

Greasy Geezers Related Releases singles chronology
"'Fry You Like Fish @ The Jam'" (2011)	"Greasy Geezers Revival Jubilee" (2012)

"Greasy Geezer’s Revival Jubilee" is a dance revival UK Garage, Electro re-release from the dance production unit ‘Greasy Geezers’. The ep was released 16 April 2012 on I-innovate (UK) and featured various artists.

== Background ==
The ep was the 2012 digital version of a vinyl UK Garage ep compilation released several years earlier by Greasy Geezers. The inspiration for the revival release was the featured track Elizabeth (Queen’s Heads) which coincided with UK events surrounding the Diamond Jubilee of Queen Elizabeth II. Originally the vinyl edition was presented by UK Urban promoter DJ Iron (Ian Moore) and South London based producer Chino.

The main track of the ep Elizabeth was originally produced by Chino featuring MC Skalza who were performers in the early-00’s on the London UK Garage circuit at venues such as REX, Ceasar’s and Ocean.

The digital release also features material by East London based vocalists Thunder and Flow and the production unit Hekcentrik.

== Artwork and music video ==
Reminiscent of previous releases by Greasy Geezers the artwork and music video showcases a lighthearted graffiti based cartoon style. The ep cover depicts the theme of the release with Queen Elizabeth II as a metaphor for money. The term Queens Heads is a reference to the Queens face on British pound notes. The audiovisual supporting the release is a humorous animated montage. Artwork and audiovisuals were provided by I-innovate Communications.

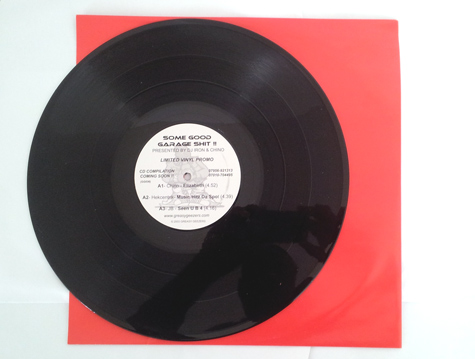
Original 12-inch vinyl edition released on the 'Greasy Geezers' label

== Reaction ==
The digital version was featured on urban music magazine sites. The songs from the initial vinyl release of the ep several years earlier received airplay on UK national radio. A featured song on the release Pins and Needles reached radio playlists on CK Flash (Choice FM), Flavour (107.1 FM), DJ EZ (Kiss FM) and Roach Rider, Martin Larner (Kiss FM) and DJ Rick-o-chet (106 FM).

The song ‘Elizabeth’ (Queen’s Headz) taken from the ep received airplay on UK regional radio coinciding with the Queen's Diamond Jubilee summer celebrations. Notable stations included DeJa Vu FM, UrbanKronix FM and Rinse FM.

== Single Release Track listing ==
Based on iTunes track listing
No.	Title	Length
1.	"Elizabeth (Queen’s Headz)"" (feat. MC Skalza)	4:43
2.	"Pins & Needles" (Radio Edit)" (feat. MC Smoove)	4:08
3.	"Just Bounce"" (feat. Thunder & Flow)	3:39
4.	"Rise" (Unreleased, Freestyle)" (feat. MC Skalza)	4:52
5.	"What U Do" (Outro)" (feat. Radical Chambers)	2:00
Total length:		19:22

== Credits and personnel ==
- Chino (Ola Bakry) – Producer - Track(s) 1,2 & 4
- MC Skalza - Songwriter - Track(s) 1 & 4
- MC Smoove - Songwriter - Track 2
- Passion - Vocailst - Track 1
- Hekcentrik (Niyi Towolawi) – Songwriter & Producer - Track 4
- Mel Glynn & Gareth Glynn - Producer(s) - Track 3
- Thunder (Mathias Elliot) & John (Flow) - Songwriters - Track 3
- Najero Okenabirhie – I-innovate (UK) - Executive Producer
- Darren 'Early Bird' Wethen – Compilation Arrangement
