= Julie Roberts =

American country music singer (born 1979)

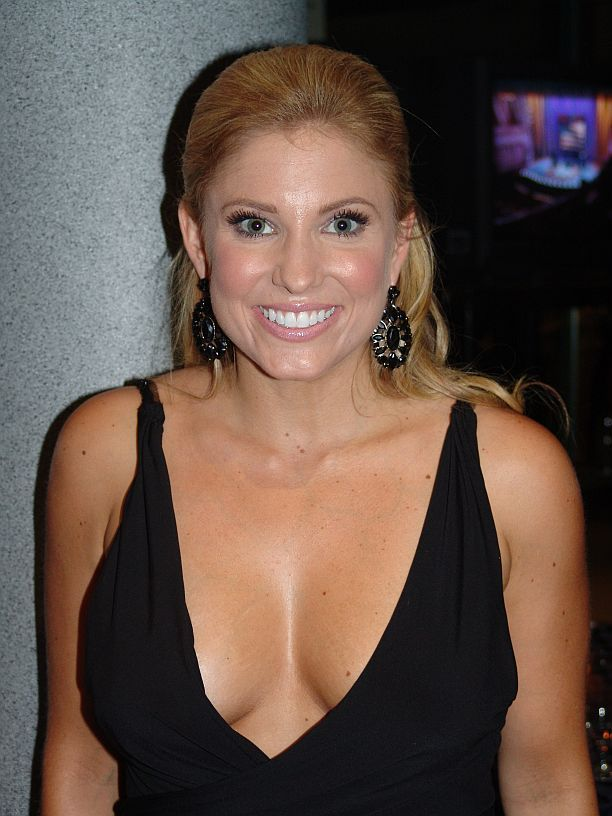
- Roberts in 2005

Background information
- Born: February 1, 1979 (age 47)
- Origin: Lancaster, South Carolina, U.S.
- Genres: Country
- Occupation: Singer-songwriter
- Years active: 2003–present
- Labels: Mercury Nashville, Sun
- Website: Official website

Julie Roberts (born February 1, 1979) is an American country music singer. Signed to Mercury Nashville in 2003, Roberts made her debut with the single "Break Down Here" in February 2004, a Top 20 hit on the Billboard Hot Country Singles & Tracks (now Hot Country Songs) charts and the first track from her self-titled debut album. A second album for Mercury, Men & Mascara, followed in 2006. This album produced two non-charting singles in its title track and a cover of Saving Jane's "Girl Next Door".

In 2013, she took part in the Blind Auditions of fourth season of the reality television show The Voice but failed to qualify. Her comeback album Good Wine & Bad Decision charted on both US Country Albums chart and the US Indie Albums charts.

Roberts has multiple sclerosis.

== Biography ==
Julie Roberts was born in Lancaster, South Carolina, United States, in 1979. The daughter of an engineer and accountant, she began her life performing in pre-school plays. She also was in school choirs and performed in a rendition of "My Fair Lady" at a singing summer camp. Roberts began performing country music as a child. When she was in junior high and high school, she toured with her family, playing at festivals in North Carolina, South Carolina and Georgia. She also performed at area nursing homes (where she developed an appreciation for blues music); and worked at Carowinds (a theme park in Charlotte, North Carolina) and Dollywood. She also worked with 60- and 70-year-old men performing at nursing homes. Her influences include Dolly Parton, Barbara Mandrell and Tanya Tucker.

She first attended USC Lancaster in her hometown from 1997 to 1999 before graduating from Belmont University in Nashville, Tennessee, with a degree in business administration. Roberts performed in local clubs and restaurants until graduation, she began working for Mercury Nashville Records, later becoming assistant to label head Luke Lewis. During her tenure there, she recorded a demo tape with producer Brent Rowan during her off-time. Rowan eventually played the tape for Lewis, who was favorably impressed by the recording.

=== Country music career ===
Roberts was signed to Universal Music Group Nashville's Mercury Nashville division. Her debut single, "Break Down Here", was released on February 24, 2004. The song had previously been recorded by Trace Adkins under the title "I'd Sure Hate to Break Down Here". Roberts released her self-titled debut album on May 25, 2004. It charted within the Top 10 of the Billboard Top Country Albums chart, peaking at No. 9. "Break Down Here" became a Top 20 single on the Hot Country Songs chart, however, she never charted within the Top 40 after that. The two follow-up singles, "The Chance" and "Wake Up Older", peaked at No. 47 and No. 46 on the country charts, respectively. The album was then certified Gold by the Recording Industry Association of America on December 13, 2004.

In 2006, she released her fourth single, "Men & Mascara", which would in-turn be the title track to her second album. Men & Mascara was released on June 27, 2006. Although not charting a single from this album, it managed to chart even higher than her debut album. It reached No. 4 on the Top Country Albums and No. 25 on the all-genre Billboard 200. Included on the album is a cover version of Saving Jane's "Girl Next Door", however, it failed to chart along with the album's title track.

Roberts and Mercury Records parted ways at the beginning of May 2010. She released her third album "Alive" on June 7 as an independent artist, with the first single being "NASCAR Party".

In 2011, Roberts revealed that she was diagnosed with multiple sclerosis.

Sun Records signed Roberts to a recording contract in mid-2013. Her album Good Wine & Bad Decisions was the first full release for the label in 40 years.

Roberts will release the album Ain’t in No Hurry on October 28, 2022.

=== Charities ===
Roberts made a donation of $124,250 to St. Jude's Children's Research Hospital after she, along with contestant Peter Buccellato, won the $100,000 prize in the bonus round on the game show Wheel of Fortune on an episode that aired in February 2007.

== The Voice (2013) ==
In 2013, Julie Roberts took part in the Blind Auditions of fourth season of the reality television show The Voice. In the third Blind Audition episode broadcast on NBC on April 1, 2013, she sang a cover of Blake Shelton's version of the Dave Barnes song "God Gave Me You". None of the four judges, Adam Levine, Shakira, Usher or Blake Shelton pressed their "I Want You" buttons to turn their chairs and she did not qualify to the following rounds. Shelton immediately recognized the contestant and introduced her by name to the other judges.

== Discography ==
=== Studio albums ===
| Title | Album details | Peak chart positions | | | Certifications (sales threshold) |
| Title | Album details | US Country | US | US Indie | Certifications (sales threshold) |
|---|---|---|---|---|---|
| Julie Roberts | Release date: May 25, 2004; Label: Mercury Nashville; Formats: CD, music download | 9 | 51 | — | US: Gold |
| Men & Mascara | Release date: June 27, 2006; Label: Mercury Nashville; Formats: CD, music download | 4 | 25 | — | |
| Alive | Release date: June 7, 2011; Label: Ain't Skeerd Records; Formats: CD, music download | — | — | — | |
| Good Wine & Bad Decisions | Release date: October 29, 2013; Label: Sun Records; Formats: CD, music download | 36 | — | 47 | |
| Ain't in No Hurry | Release date: October 28, 2022; Label: ONErpm Nashville; Formats: CD, music download | — | — | — | |
"—" denotes releases that did not chart

=== Extended plays ===
| Title | Album details |
|---|---|
| Who Needs Mistletoe | Release date: November 1, 2011; Label: Ain't Skeerd Records; Formats: CD, music download |
| Sweet Carolina | Release date: April 30, 2012; Label: Ain't Skeerd Records; Formats: music download |
| Naked Series | Release date: 2012; Label: Ain't Skeerd Records; Formats: music download |
| Covered | Release date: September 17, 2012; Label: Ain't Skeerd Records; Formats: music download |

=== Singles ===
| Year | Single | Peak chart positions | | Album |
| Year | Single | US Country | US | Album |
|---|---|---|---|---|
| 2004 | "Break Down Here" | 18 | 81 | Julie Roberts |
| 2004 | "The Chance" | 47 | — | Julie Roberts |
| 2005 | "Wake Up Older" | 46 | — | Julie Roberts |
| 2006 | "Men & Mascara" | — | — | Men & Mascara |
| 2006 | "Girl Next Door" | — | — | Men & Mascara |
| 2011 | "NASCAR Party" | — | — | Alive |
| 2012 | "The Star-Spangled Banner" | — | — | Non-album song |
| 2019 | "I Couldn't Make You Love Me" | — | — | TBD |
"—" denotes releases that did not chart

=== Music videos ===
| Year | Video | Director |
|---|---|---|
| 2004 | "Break Down Here" | Steven Goldmann |
| 2004 | "The Chance" | Michael McNamara |
| 2005 | "Wake Up Older" | Steven Goldmann |
| 2006 | "Men & Mascara" | Peter Zavadil |
| 2011 | "NASCAR Party" | Camp Riley |
| 2012 | "Whiskey and You" | Zac Adams |
| 2012 | "Sweet Carolina" | Fabio Frey |
| 2013 | "He Made A Woman Out Of Me" | |
