= Jann Browne =

American country singer

- Born: Jana Lynn Stebner; March 14, 1954 (age 72)
- Origin: Anderson, Indiana, United States
- Genres: Country
- Occupation: Singer
- Instrument: Vocals
- Years active: 1989-present
- Labels: Curb, Cross 3, Plan B
- Formerly of: Asleep at the Wheel
- Website: www.jannbrowne.com

Jann Browne (born Jana Lynn Stebner; March 14, 1954) is an American country music singer. She moved to Southern California in 1978 where she performed in a number of Orange County country bars. From 1981 through 1983, before her solo career, she was a vocalist with the Western swing group Asleep at the Wheel. She has recorded four studio albums, and has charted three singles on the Hot Country Songs charts. Her highest single is the 1990s "Tell Me Why" at No. 18. She was named "Female Entertainer of the Year", and her song "Louisville" was named "Song of the Year", by the California Country Music Association. In 1990, she was nominated for Top New Female Vocalist at the Academy of Country Music Awards, along with Daniele Alexander and Mary Chapin Carpenter, but lost to Carpenter.

== Discography ==
=== Albums ===
Title	Album details	Peak positions
Title	Album details	US Country
Tell Me Why	Release date: February 12, 1990; Label: Curb Records	46
It Only Hurts When I Laugh	Release date: April 23, 1991; Label: Curb Records	—
Count Me In	Release date: September 12, 1995; Label: Cross Three Records	—
Missed Me by a Mile	Release date: October 30, 2001; Label: Plan B Records	—
Buckin' Around	Release date: March 6, 2007; Label: Plan B Records	—
"—" denotes releases that did not chart

=== Singles ===
Year	Single	Peak positions	Album
Year	Single	US Country	Album
1989	"You Ain't Down Home"	19	Tell Me Why
1989	"Tell Me Why"	18	Tell Me Why
1990	"Mexican Wind"	—^{A}	Tell Me Why
1990	"Louisville"	75	Tell Me Why
1991	"Better Love Next Time"	—	It Only Hurts When I Laugh
1991	"It Only Hurts When I Laugh"	—	It Only Hurts When I Laugh
"—" denotes releases that did not chart

Notes:

- ^{A} "Mexican Wind" did not chart on Hot Country Songs, but peaked at No. 2 on Hot Country Radio Breakouts.

=== Music videos ===
Year	Video
1990	"Tell Me Why"
1990	"Mexican Wind"
1991	"Better Love Next Time"

== Awards and nominations ==
Year	Organization	Award	Nominee/Work	Result
1990	Academy of Country Music Awards	Top New Female Vocalist	Jann Browne	Nominated
