= Break Down Here =

Single by Julie Roberts

from the album Julie Roberts
- B-side: "No Way Out"
- Released: February 23, 2004
- Recorded: 2003
- Genre: Country
- Length: 4:06
- Label: Mercury Nashville
- Songwriters: Jess Brown; Patrick Jason Matthews
- Producer: Brent Rowan

Julie Roberts singles chronology
"Break Down Here" (2004)	"The Chance" (2004)

"Break Down Here" is the debut single by American country music artist Julie Roberts. The song was written by Jess Brown and Patrick Jason Matthews, with Brent Rowan providing production on the song. The song was initially recorded by Trace Adkins in 2003, but his version was not released as a single. Mercury Nashville released the song to country radio on February 23, 2004, as the lead single to her eponymous debut studio album (2004).

The single reached number 18 on the US Hot Country Songs chart, becoming Roberts' sole top-forty hit on the chart.

== History ==
The song's B-side, included on the vinyl and CD single, was a cover of Suzy Bogguss's "No Way Out", from her 1996 album Give Me Some Wheels.

The song was originally recorded as "I'd Sure Hate to Break Down Here" by country singer Trace Adkins on his 2003 album Comin' On Strong. However, his version of the song was not released as a single.

== Content ==
"Break Down Here" is a mid-tempo ballad centered on the narrator, who is driving by herself on the freeway, escaping a failed relationship with all of her belongings in the back of the vehicle. Realizing that her car is beginning to make a noise and that she is far from an exit, she states that she would "sure hate to break down here". The phrase has a double meaning: she does not want the vehicle to break down, and she does not want to break down and cry ("I've made it this far without crying a single tear").

== Music video ==
A music video was released for the song, directed by Steven Goldmann. Roberts is driving through a desolate country road with her ex-lover passed out in the shotgun seat. During the course of the video, she tosses mementos from her now finished relationship out the window, and eventually her ex-lover disappears, having been revealed to be a hallucination. Shots of Roberts singing in her stopped car while the rain is pouring outside and her car breaking down are interspersed throughout the video.

The video was added to GAC-TV's playlists during the week of February 29, 2004.

== Critical reception ==
Kelefa Sanneh of The New York Times described the song favorably, calling it "one of the year's best country ballads" and "an aching but resolute lament".

== Commercial performance ==
"Break Down Here" debuted on the US Billboard Hot Country Songs chart on February 21, 2004, at number 60. The single entered the top-forty the week of April 10, 2004, becoming Roberts' first and only top-forty song. The song would reach its peak position of number 18 on the chart on September 11, 2004, spending 32 weeks in total on the chart.

The song shot straight to number one on the Top Country Singles Sales chart the week of April 17, 2004, making Roberts the first female artist to debut atop the chart since LeAnn Rimes did so in the August 5, 2000 issue with "I Need You".

== Personnel ==
The following musicians performed on this track:

- Shannon Forrest – drums
- David Hungate – bass guitar
- Tim Lauer – pump organ
- Pat McLaughlin – background vocals
- Gordon Mote – keyboards
- Julie Roberts – lead vocals
- Brent Rowan – electric guitar
- Bryan Sutton – acoustic guitar, mandocello

== Charts ==
=== Weekly charts ===
Weekly chart performance for "Break Down Here"
Chart (2004)	Peak position
Canada Country (Radio & Records)	25
US Billboard Hot 100	81
US Hot Country Songs (Billboard)	18
US Top Country Singles Sales (Billboard)	1
US Country Top 50 (Radio & Records)	17

=== Year-end charts ===
Year-end chart performance for "Break Down Here"
Chart (2004)	Position
US Country Songs (Billboard)	61
US Top Country Singles Sales (Billboard)	4
US Country (Radio & Records)	68
