= MCM – The Gospel: The Missing Gems of MCM Caveman =

The Gospel The Missing Gems of MCM Caveman
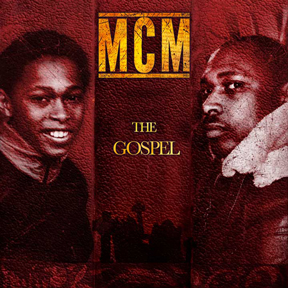

Studio album by MCM
- Released: May 30, 2011
- Recorded: 1994–2011
- Genre: Hip hop
- Length: 1hr 53min (digital release only)
- Label: I-innovate (UK)

MCM chronology
The Whole 9 yards (1992)	The Gospel; The Missing Gems of MCM Caveman (2011)	Gospel Reprise: A Few More Gems (2012)

Professional ratings
Review scores
Source	Rating
Ryan Proctor O2TN	(Good)
UKHH.COM	(Good)
L3 Magazine	(Good)

The Gospel: The Missing Gems of MCM Caveman is the first solo studio album release by veteran UK Hip-Hop artist MCM, real name Mark Layman. MCM originally was the front man for 1990s UK Hip-Hop group Caveman. It contains recordings from 1994 to 2011.

== Background ==
In the 1990s Caveman gained notoriety for becoming one of the few UK rap acts of that era to have been picked up by a US record label (Profile Records, 1990). Caveman was considered one of the pioneer UK Hip Hop acts of the Golden Age (arguably between the late 1980s to the mid-90s). In the Mid-90s MCM pursued a solo career maintaining the musical authenticity of Caveman.

The Gospel album creation process actually began in 1994 with the initial album project originally called "The Gospel According to Mark". The 90's version of the gospel album had twelve full length tracks. The 2011 Gospel album represented the journey between 1994 and 2011, covering all the unreleased tracks that were due to be released on MCM projects through the 1990s and 00s. Through the 1990s, MCM put the Gospel album on hold to pursue collaboration ventures with other artists and producers. Songs from some of those projects are included in the 2011 version.

In 2010, MCM recorded over a dozen new songs making the new gospel album a 33 track double-album project, now released by indie label I-Innovate (UK). This included a hip-hop remake of one of Caveman's most popular songs 'Fry You like Fish'. The album utilizes predominately Jazz and fusion samples and is considered an inter-linking glance at the journey of UK hip hop from the mid-90s up until the album release June 2011. This concept is symbolized by the album cover designed by Christopher Gibbs which depicts a childhood picture of MCM (left-side) becoming the grown man (right-side).

== Promotion ==
The album promotion by I-innovate (UK) was based around a graveyard concept which MCM used to symbolize the state of authenticity in hip-hop in 2011.

In April 2012 a complementary ep Gospel Reprise: A Few More Gems was released digitally by I-innovate (UK). The ep featured full length versions of the intermission songs 'Farther Forgive Intermission' and 'Ty intro (skit)' found on the Gospel Album.

== Reaction ==
The Gospel project generally received positive reviews from the hip-hop media in the UK, US and Europe.

" Ryan Proctor, Old To The New (UK) - Album Review – MCM, April 2011"

"The Gospel" is a mammoth collection of full-length joints and instrumental interludes spanning the last seventeen years. There are some who will consider "The Gospel" to be a comeback of sorts for MCM, but in essence, the likeable emcee from Bucks never left, as evidenced by the wealth of quality unreleased material included here. MCM's love of soulful breaks and samples ties "The Gospel" together, and it's this passion for all things funky that informs all the tracks included here, both old and new. "The Gospel" showcases an artist whose creative direction has never been influenced by the trends of the time, with MCM's love of true-school Hip-Hop evident throughout. ".

" Olivia Lewis, L3 Magazine (Canada/US) (August 2011) Album Reviews"

Delivering fresh lyrical tales built to refresh hip hop lovers soul, MCM gives us the gospel. The UK native narrates what it is to truly represent the art form. Single handedly assisting listeners, on their quest for the real. Consisting of 33 tracks, listeners easily get stuck in a time warp when they hear the MC DJ tacks like 'I Got Soul', 'Early Days' and 'Lyrical Lecture' take a glimpse in to the MC's soul. Staying true to the roots of Hip Hop. MCM infuses overtones reggae such as the baseline in the tune 'Bugged Out' 'In an arena where Rap rules, ode to Hip Hop stays alive with MCM'.".

== Track listing ==
Based on iTunes track listing
No.	Title	Producer(s)	Length
1.	"Ty Intro" (feat. Ty)	MCM	1:12
2.	"Fry You Like Fish (The Gospel Version)'"	Rinse Dog	3:44
3.	"Jay Dee Tribute" (feat. Magical)	MCM	4:32
4.	"Still Got It"	MCM	3:59
5.	"Brazilia Beat"	MCM	0:21
6.	"Came Into My Life" (feat. MJ)	DJ Nappa	3:52
7.	"Conscious Skit (I Am A Man)"	MCM	1:28
8.	"Blow Ur Mind"	Maverick	3:32
9.	"Lost Souls In The Wilderness"	MCM	3:24
10.	"You Can't Fade Me"	DJ Devastate	4:25
11.	"Father Forgive Intermission" (feat. Q-Reppin)	DJ Nappa	3:03
12.	"Time Will Tell"	MCM	4:35
13.	"Bugged Out Sh_t"	MCM	0:40
14.	"Back Again"	Si Spex	4:15
15.	"Early Days"	MCM	5:32
16.	"Sailing Beat"	MCM	0:54
17.	"The Game" (feat. Q-Reppin)	MCM	3:44
18.	"On The Spot" (feat. Da Verse, TKO)	MCM	3:14
19.	"Lyrical Lecture" (feat. DJ Bizzness)	DJ Bizzness	3:02
20.	"Stand Firm"	DJ Devastate	4:10
21.	"Love Has" (feat. C-Lone)	MCM	4:27
22.	"Flying High Beat"	MCM	0:47
23.	"Can You Feel It"	MCM	3:22
24.	"Hush"	Marco	3:02
25.	"MJ Beat"	MCM	3:02
26.	"The Strength"	Mr Brown	4:12
27.	"Party Over Here"	DJ Nappa	4:08
28.	"Straight On Up"	The Creators	5:37
29.	"Spontaneous"	MCM	4:22
30.	"Powermoves"	MCM	5:26
31.	"Got To Be Beat"	MCM	0:52
32.	"I Got Soul (Remix)"	MCM	5:26
33.	"For The Musical Receivers"	MCM	6:07
Total length:			1:53:27
