= Tell Me Why (Jann Browne song) =

Single by Jann Browne

from the album Tell Me Why
- B-side: "There Ain't No Train"
- Released: November 25, 1989
- Genre: Country
- Length: 2:55
- Label: Curb
- Songwriter(s): Gail Davies, Harry Stinson
- Producer(s): Steve Fishell

Jann Browne singles chronology
"You Ain't Down Home" (1989)	"Tell Me Why" (1989)	"Louisville" (1990)

"Tell Me Why" is a song written by Gail Davies and Harry Stinson, and recorded by American country music artist Jann Browne. It was released in November 1989 as the second single and title track from the album Tell Me Why. The song reached number 18 on the Billboard Hot Country Singles & Tracks chart.

== Chart performance ==
Chart (1989–1990)	Peak position
US Hot Country Songs (Billboard)	18
