= Tell Me How =

Tell Me How may refer to

- "Tell Me How", song by Buddy Holly from The "Chirping" Crickets
- "Tell Me How", song by Chad Brock from III
- "Tell Me How", song by Paramore from After Laughter
