= Girl Next Door (Saving Jane song) =

2005 single by Saving Jane

Single by Saving Jane

from the album Girl Next Door
- Released: August 15, 2005
- Genre: Pop rock
- Length: 3:25
- Label: Universal
- Songwriters: Marti Dodson; Pat Buzzard; Kris Misevski; Dak Goodman; Jeremy Martin
- Producers: Mark Liggett; Brian Lovely; Jerry Lane

Saving Jane singles chronology
"Girl Next Door" (2005)	"Happy" (2006)

"Girl Next Door" is a song by American pop rock band Saving Jane, released as the first single from the band's second studio album of the same name (2005) on August 15, 2005. The song was a top-40 success on several US Billboard charts, peaking at number 31 on the Hot 100.

== Music video ==
A music video for "Girl Next Door" was released in February 2006. It was recorded over one weekend in Los Angeles despite harsh weather; a spokesperson of Saving Jane's label said the video used the rain effectively, and that it had stopped before the filming of important scenes. The video featured on MTV's Total Request Live.

It stars two girls, one jealous of the other. When the second chorus kicks in, the girl uses her powers to hit the jealous one. They both appear in separate scenes, thanks to a pink double-screen. The lead singer is performing in a classroom, and with her band at a concert. The video ends with the girls in two limos. The jealous one somehow cuts into the other girl's screen, and steals a tiara from her. She tries to get it back, but bangs her head on the side of her screen instead.

== Other versions ==
A version of "Girl Next Door" was included in the 2006 video game expansion The Sims 2: Pets, written in the fictional language Simlish. Country singer Julie Roberts recorded a version of the song for her 2006 studio album, Men & Mascara, after the lead single failed to chart. A Kidz Bop version was released in 2006.

== Track listing ==
Canadian CD single

1. "Girl Next Door" (radio edit) – 3:28
2. "Girl Next Door" (original mix) – 3:15
3. "Girl Next Door" (AAA mix) – 3:10

== Charts ==
Chart (2006)	Peak position
US Billboard Hot 100	31
US Adult Pop Airplay (Billboard)	23
US Pop 100 (Billboard)	27
US Pop Airplay (Billboard)	21
