= Positive Reaction (album) =

Studio album by Caveman
- Released: 1991
- Recorded: 1990–1991
- Genre: Hip hop
- Label: Profile Records
- Producer: The Principle

Caveman chronology
Positive Reaction (1991)	The Whole Nine Yards... And Then Some (1992)

Professional ratings
Review scores
Source	Rating
RapReviews	9/10
Sounds	3/5 stars

Positive Reaction is the debut album by UK hip hop group Caveman. The album, featuring jazz-influenced hip hop, spent two weeks on the albums chart and contains the single "I'm Ready".

== Track listing ==
1. "Troglodyte History" 1:35
2. "Victory (Remix)" 5:04
3. "Positive Reaction" 4:35
4. "Cool (Cos I Don't Get Upset)" 4:32
5. "Pages And Pages" 5:29
6. "Fry You Like Fish (Jazz Remix)" 4:29
7. "I'm Ready" 4:01
8. "Caught Up" 5:26
9. "You Can't Take It" 5:23
10. "Desmond" 3:56
11. "The Dope Department" 5:10
12. "Back To Cause Mayhem" 3:23
13. "Victory" 5:26
14. "Introduction to a Caveman" 5:26

== Charts ==
Chart (1991)	Peak position
UK Albums Chart	43

=== Singles ===
Year	Song	UK Singles Chart
1991	"I'm Ready"	64
