= Broken & Beautiful (Suzie McNeil album) =

Studio album by Suzie McNeil
- Released: April 10, 2007
- Genre: Pop rock
- Length: 36:44
- Label: Curve Music; Universal Music Canada
- Producer: Marti Frederiksen

Suzie McNeil chronology
| Broken & Beautiful (2007) | Rock-n-Roller (2008) |

Singles from Broken & Beautiful
- 1. "Hung Up" Released: 2007; 2. "Believe" Released: September 17, 2007; 3. "Broken & Beautiful" Released: 2007; 4. "Lonely (Are You Coming Home?)" Released: 2008

Broken & Beautiful is the debut album from Canadian pop rock artist Suzie McNeil, released on April 10, 2007, through Curve Music. It was preceded by the release of radio hit "Hung Up" and features the popular single "Believe", which served as an official anthem for the Canadian Olympic team in the 2010 Winter Olympics.

== Critical reception ==
Professional ratings
Review scores
| Source | Rating |
|---|---|
| AllMusic | 4/5 stars |

Matthew Chisling of AllMusic stated that the record was a strong effort where "...every single track individually is strong, and the best moments on the album are stronger than anything Kelly Clarkson ever recorded. With any luck, Broken and Beautiful will be a commercial success and McNeil will become the household name she deserves to be."

== Track listing ==
| No. | Title | Writer(s) | Length |
|---|---|---|---|
| 1. | "Lonely (Are You Coming Home?)" | Kara DioGuardi, Marti Frederiksen | 4:28 |
| 2. | "Believe" | DioGuardi, Frederiksen | 3:41 |
| 3. | "Hung Up" | Frederiksen, Suzie McNeil, Mikal Reid | 2:52 |
| 4. | "So In Love" | Frederiksen, Alecia Moore | 4:04 |
| 5. | "Skin" | Frederiksen, Richie Supa, Jodi Marr | 3:13 |
| 6. | "Too Low" | Frederiksen, Andy Frampton, Steve Kipner | 3:28 |
| 7. | "Broken & Beautiful" | Michelle Lewis, Johan Aberg, Sigurd Rosnes | 3:39 |
| 8. | "Poison" | John Rzeznik, Gregg Wattenberg, Frederiksen, McNeil | 4:06 |
| 9. | "Where Were You?" | Frederiksen, McNeil, Sean Cotton | 3:40 |
| 10. | "The One" | DioGuardi, Frederiksen | 3:23 |

== Personnel ==
Adapted from the Broken & Beautiful liner notes.

- Marti Frederiksen – producer, mixing, engineering ("Hung Up" and "Skin")
- Brian Paturalski – mixing, engineering
- PK Pandey and John Shipp – engineering ("Believe")
- Dave Donnelly – mastering
- Kimberlee Miller – photography
- Joanne Howard – graphic design

== Awards and nominations ==
| Year | Award | Nominated work | Result |
|---|---|---|---|
| 2008 | Juno Award for New Artist of the Year | Broken and Beautiful | Nominated |
| 2008 | Canadian Radio Music Award for Hot AC | "Hung Up" | Nominated |
| 2008 | Canadian Radio Music Award for AC | "Believe" | Nominated |

== Charts ==
=== Singles ===
| Year | Single | Peak pos. |
| Year | Single | CAN |
|---|---|---|
| 2007 | "Hung Up" | 55 |
| 2007 | "Believe" | 61 |
| 2007 | "Broken & Beautiful" | — |
| 2008 | "Lonely (Are You Coming Home?)" | — |
"—" denotes releases that did not chart
