= Tell Me (White Lion song) =

1988 single by White Lion

Single by White Lion

from the album Pride
- A-side: "Tell Me"
- B-side: "All Join Our Hands"
- Released: June 1988
- Recorded: 1987
- Genre: Glam metal
- Length: 4:28
- Label: Atlantic
- Songwriter(s): Mike Tramp/Vito Bratta

White Lion singles chronology
"Wait" (1987)	"Tell Me" (1988)	"When the Children Cry" (1988)

"Tell Me" is a song by American/Danish glam metal band White Lion. The song was released in 1988 and is the second single from their 1987 album Pride. It peaked at number 25 on the Mainstream Rock chart and number 58 on the Billboard Hot 100.

== Background and release ==
"Tell Me" features a music video and together along with "Wait" and "When the Children Cry" made Pride a massive success.

Mike Tramp has said,

"It just proves that the album is timeless. Those songs will live on forever."

"Tell Me" is a snapshot of the late 1980s sound. The production had that "stadium" sound with a lot of echo which featured in the video.

== Compilations ==
The song along with the rest of Pride was featured on White Lion's 2020 compilation album, "'All You Need Is Rock 'N' Roll - The Complete Albums 1985-1991'".

== Track listing ==
1. "Tell Me" – 4:28
2. "All Join Our Hands" – 4:11

== Personnel ==
- Mike Tramp – lead vocals
- Vito Bratta – lead guitar
- James Lomenzo – bass guitar
- Greg D'Angelo – drums

== Charts ==
Chart (1988)	Peak position
US Billboard Hot 100	58
US Album Rock Tracks (Billboard)	25
