= Tell Me Why (Jann Browne album) =

Studio album by Jann Browne
- Released: February 20, 1990
- Recorded: 1989
- Genre: Country
- Label: Curb
- Producer: Steve Fishell

Jann Browne chronology
Tell Me Why (1990)	It Only Hurts When I Laugh (1991)

Singles from Tell Me Why
- 1. "You Ain't Down Home" Released: July 1, 1989; 2. "Tell Me Why" Released: November 25, 1989; 3. "Mexican Wind" Released: July 9, 1990; 4. "Louisville" Released: September 1990

Professional ratings
Review scores
Source	Rating
Allmusic	4.5/5 stars

Tell Me Why is the début studio album by American country music artist Jann Browne. Three singles from the album rose to positions on the Billboard Country Singles charts: "You Ain't Down Home" at #19, "Tell Me Why" at #18, and "Louisville" at #75. Also featured on the album is a cover of The Davis Sisters' "I Forgot More Than You'll Ever Know," a duet with veteran rockabilly artist Wanda Jackson. Emmylou Harris provides backing vocals on "Mexican Wind." The album rose to #46 on the Billboard Country Albums chart.

== Track listing ==
No.	Title	Writer(s)	Length
1.	"Tell Me Why"	Gail Davies, Harry Stinson	2:54
2.	"Ain't No Train"	Jann Browne, Pat Gallagher	3:26
3.	"'Til a Tear Becomes a Rose"	Bill Rice, Sharon Vaughn	3:50
4.	"Louisville"	Browne, Gallagher	3:11
5.	"Mexican Wind"	Browne, Gallagher, Roger Stebner	3:53
6.	"Losing You"	Paul Kennerley	3:20
7.	"You Ain't Down Home"	Jamie O'Hara	3:41
8.	"The One You Slip Around With"	Harlan Howard, Fuzzy Owen	2:29
9.	"I Forgot More Than You'll Ever Know" (duet with Wanda Jackson)	Cecil Null	3:16
10.	"Lovebird"	Steve Spurgin	4:13

== Personnel ==
- Byron Berline - fiddle, mandolin
- Michael Bowden - bass
- Jann Browne - vocals, background vocals
- Bill Bryson - bass
- James Burton - guitar
- Sam Bush - mandolin
- John Cowan - bass
- Iris DeMent - harp, harmony vocals
- Steve Fishell - resonator guitar, steel guitar, lap steel guitar, pedal steel, Weissenborn
- Béla Fleck - banjo
- Rosie Flores - background vocals
- Pat Flynn - acoustic guitar
- Glen D. Hardin - piano
- Emmylou Harris - harmony vocals
- Wanda Jackson - vocals
- John Jorgenson - mandolin, Spanish guitar
- Albert Lee - electric guitar, acoustic guitar
- Richard MacDonald - bass, acoustic guitar
- John Molo - drums
- Weldon Myrick - steel guitar, pedal steel
- Harry Stinson - background vocals
- Billy Thomas - drums, percussion, background vocals
- Wanda Vick - fiddle, acoustic guitar
- Don Whaley - bass, background vocals

== Cover Version ==
In 2002 Dwight Yoakam covered "Louisville" for his box set 'Reprise Please Baby.'

== Chart performance ==
Chart (1990)	Peak position
U.S. Billboard Top Country Albums	46
