= Conceptual Love =

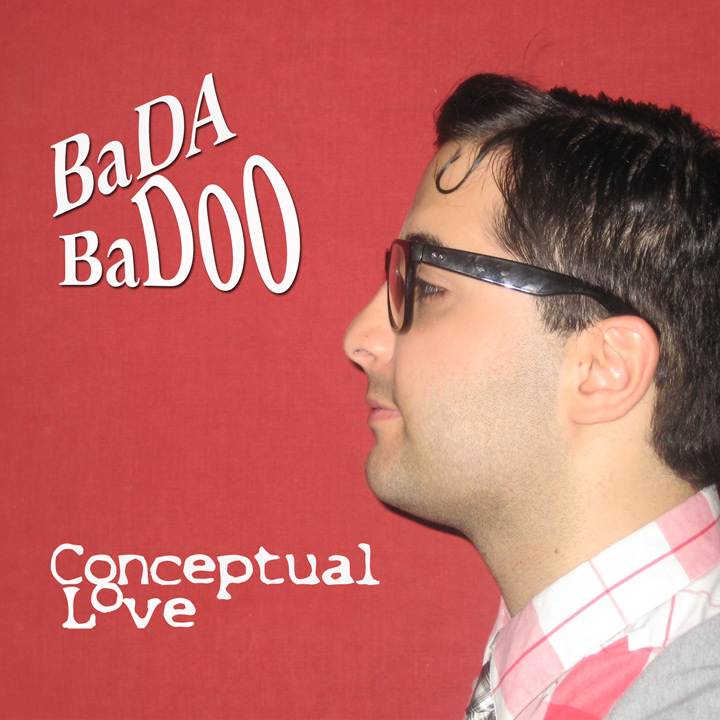
- Bada Badoo - Conceptual Love Single Artwork

Single by Bada Badoo
- Released: 27 September 2010
- Genre: R&B, Pop
- Length: 3:29 (UK Radio Edit)
- Label: I-innovate (UK)
- Songwriter(s): Baddar Chowdhry
- Producer(s): George Eyo, Mel Glynn, Najero Okenabirhie

"Conceptual Love" was the debut single by singer Bada Badoo and was the first official single release by any featured performer from X-Factor, UK series 7 (ITV/SYCO, 2010). Bada Badoo, real name Baddar Chowdhry gained notoriety for his initial stage performance on the X-Factor (UK) TV Series. Bada Badoo entered the competition at the Cardiff, Wales auditions and reached the latter stages of Boot camp. With a geek persona his televised performance of the Tom Jones version of ‘I Who Have Nothing’ coined a Cheryl Cole soundbyte ‘Don’t Judge a book by its cover’. The geek persona was later carried forward in to the promotion campaign for the Conceptual Love Single released by I-innovate (UK).

The original music composition for Conceptual Love was based on a song by R&B/Soul group The Wah Wah Collective called ‘Quartet Junkie’. This original recording was taken by I-innovate (UK), indie label of the Wah Wah Collective and restructured by the Greasy Geezers production unit for the Bada Badoo release.

== Critical reception ==
The single release date Monday, 27 September 2010 coincided with the last televised appearance of Bada Badoo on the X-Factor TV series. Saturday, 25 September (ITV/SYCO, 2010). Conceptual Love gained regional radio airplay in the UK and was supported with radio interviews at various stations including Real Radio 105-106fm (Wales) and The Martin Lowes Show 2BR Radio 99.8fm (Lancashire).

"themusiccritic.co.uk" gave the song a positive single review stating:

" Conceptual Love is a chilled slice of radio friendly R'n'B with some serious pop overtones, and a video that has its tongue firmly in its cheek, that provides the perfect vehicle for Bada's soulful and pure voice, and you know what he may just have a hit on his hands. There is a place in UK music at the moment for a truly great soul voice and if he can live up to the early promise of this single, then he will certainly have a career that lasts a lot longer than that of Leon Jackson, Shayne Ward or Steve Brookstein".

== Music video ==
The Conceptual Love single was promoted online through comedic video skits by I-innovate (UK) emphasizing the geek character of Bada Badoo. This was later supported with an Official Music Video directed by James Ward. The video was filmed on location in a Victorian library branding Bada Badoo the ‘Geek with Soul’. The music video was produced by Najero Okenabirhie for I-innovate Communications who are the video production side of the I-innovate (UK) label.

== Credits and Personnel ==
- "Lead Vocals" — Bada Badoo
- "Lyrics" — Bada Badoo
- "Producer" — George Eyo, Mel Glynn, Najero Okenabirhie
- "Record label" — I-innovate (UK)
- "Album" — The Conceptual Love single was released on the 'Cry Baby Soul' studio album by The Wah Wah Collective.
