= Caveman (group) =

British hip hop group

- Origin: High Wycombe, England
- Genres: British hip hop
- Years active: 1990–1992
- Labels: Profile
- Past members: MCM; The Principal; Diamond J

Caveman was a British hip hop group originally from High Wycombe, England, consisting of MCM, the Principal, and Diamond J. They were the first British hip hop group to be signed to a major U.S. record label, Profile Records.

== History ==
The group's first releases were the twelve inch single "Victory" (Profile, 1990) and "Fry You Like Fish" (Profile, 1990), and the I'm Ready EP (Profile, 1990). This established their jazz-based style of hip hop, influenced by U.S. artists such as Gang Starr. The song "I'm Ready", however, was based on Jimi Hendrix's, "Crosstown Traffic" and showed early on a liking for the harder style that they adopted for later releases. "I'm Ready" was a popular song, and still regularly turns up on hip hop compilation albums today.

Their debut album, Positive Reaction was released by Profile in 1990. The following year, the group released The Victory EP (Profile, 1991) and then took a break from recording. They returned with The Whole Nine Yards...And Then Some in 1992.

Shortly after the release of the album, the group decided to go their separate ways. MCM had a short-lived solo career, releasing some twelve inches and guesting on other artists' tracks - such as Dodge City Productions' "Understand This" from their Steppin' Up and Out (4th & Broadway, 1993) album. The Principal went on to produce other artist's tracks, such as a remix of Run-D.M.C.'s "Ooh, What'cha Gonna Do?" from their Down with the King (Profile, 1993) album. Diamond J went on to provide scratches for Maxim's Hell's Kitchen (XL Recordings, 2000) album.

Almost 20 years after the last Caveman album, front man MCM incorporated the name Caveman on his first solo studio album The Gospel: The Missing Gems of MCM Caveman (I-innovate UK, 2011). The double album included several unreleased tracks from the 1990s.

== Discography ==
=== Chart singles ===
- "I'm Ready" (1991) - UK No. 65

=== Chart albums ===
- Positive Reaction (1991) - UK No. 43
- The Whole Nine Yards And Then Some (1992)
