= Saving Jane =

American rock band

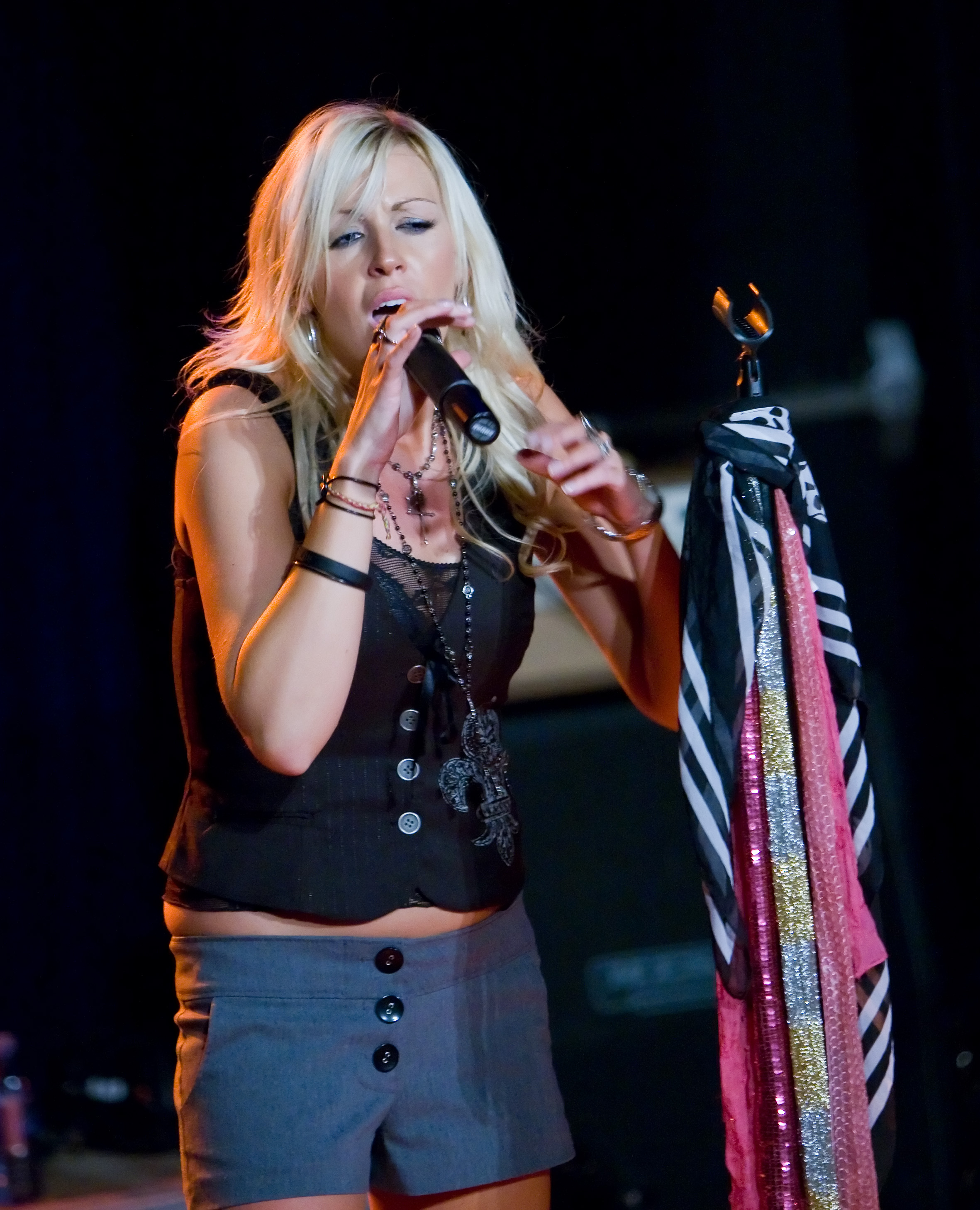
- Marti Dodson in September 2008

Background information
- Origin: Columbus, Ohio, United States
- Genres: Rock, alternative rock
- Years active: 2001–2010 (as Saving Jane); 2010–2013 (as Union Rose)
- Labels: Toucan Cove, Universal
- Members: Marti Dodson; Pat Buzzard; Dak Goodman; Eric Flores; Brandon Hagan
- Past members: Kris Misevski; Joe Cochran; Mike Unger; Jeremy Martin

Saving Jane is an American pop rock band from Columbus, Ohio, led by singer Marti Dodson. The band is known for its song "Girl Next Door".

== History ==
Saving Jane's full-length debut, Girl Next Door, was issued in October 2005 on Toucan Cove. The album's title track received major radio airplay following this release. This gained the attention of major record labels, and a contract with Republic/Universal Records, which helped them to make their debut on the Billboard charts. The single "Girl Next Door" peaked at No. 31 on the Billboard Hot 100. The video debuted on MTV's Total Request Live's countdown on April 24, 2006, at No. 9. The single "Come Down to Me" was released in late August and went on to sell over 100,000 copies.

On August 7, 2007, Saving Jane's follow up album One Girl Revolution was released.

A new song, "Butterflies" was released on iTunes in 2009. In early 2010, Saving Jane's new EP, Vampire Diaries was released on iTunes.

On October 25, 2010, the single "Worst of Me" was released onto iTunes, which was part of the album, "Psycho Ex-Girlfriend" that was due for release in Spring 2011. However, the album was ultimately shelved.

== Discography ==
=== Studio albums ===
Year	Album details	Peak chart positions	
Year	Album details	US	US Heat
2002	Something to Hold Onto: Release date: December 16, 2002; Label: self-released	—	—
2005	Girl Next Door: Release date: October 11, 2005; Label: Universal Records	133	2
2007	One Girl Revolution: Release date: August 7, 2007; Label: Universal Records	—	—
2008	SuperGirl: Release date: June 9, 2008; Label: Toucan Cove	—	—
"—" denotes releases that did not chart

=== Compilation albums ===
Year	Album details
2011	The Singles: Released: 2011; Label: Toucan Cove; Formats: Download

=== Extended plays ===
Year	Album details
2009	Butterflies: Released: 2009; Label: -; Formats: Download
2010	Vampire Diaries (EP): Released: January 2010; Label: -; Formats: Download

=== Singles ===
Year	Title	Album	Chart positions		
Year	Title	Album	U.S. Hot 100	U.S. Pop 100	U.S. Pop Airplay
2006	"Girl Next Door"	Girl Next Door	31	27	20
2006	"Happy"	Girl Next Door	-	-	—
2006	"Come Down To Me"	Girl Next Door	-	-	-
2007	"One Girl Revolution"	One Girl Revolution	-	-	—
2008	"SuperGirl"	SuperGirl	-	-	40
2008	"Breaking Up is Hard to Do"	n/a	-	-	-
2009	"Butterflies"	Butterflies (EP)	-	-	—
2010	"Worst of Me"	Psycho Ex-Girlfriend (shelved)	-	-	-
2016	"Read My Lips"	n/a	-	-	-
