= Cowboy's Back in Town =

Studio album by Trace Adkins
- Released: August 17, 2010
- Genre: Country
- Length: 38:47
- Label: Show Dog-Universal Music
- Producer: Kenny Beard (tracks 3, 6-9); Michael Knox (all other tracks)

Trace Adkins chronology
X (2008)	Cowboy's Back in Town (2010)	The Definitive Greatest Hits: 'Til the Last Shot's Fired (2010)

Singles from Cowboy's Back in Town
- 1. "Ala-Freakin-Bama" Released: December 21, 2009; 2. "This Ain't No Love Song" Released: May 17, 2010; 3. "Brown Chicken Brown Cow" Released: January 10, 2011

Cowboy's Back in Town is the ninth studio album by American country music artist Trace Adkins. It was released on August 17, 2010 by Show Dog-Universal Music. The first single "This Ain't No Love Song" was released to radio in May 2010 and debuted at number 54 on the U.S. Billboard Hot Country Songs chart for the week of May 22, 2010. Also included on the album is "Ala-Freakin-Bama," a song that charted in late 2009 and was promoted by Adkins's former label from by Capitol Records Nashville.

== Background ==
Cowboy's Back In Town is the first release for Adkins under his new record deal with Show Dog-Universal Music, after his contract with Capitol Records Nashville was fulfilled with the release of 2008's X. Adkins also commented on the recording sessions of the album, saying "Toby has said this new music has a smile on it, and maybe that's just a reflection of where I'm at right now, I have this new sense of invigoration, and making this record was a lot of fun." In an interview with Billboard Magazine, Adkins talked about the album and the title, "I feel as energized and enthusiastic as I did when I first got a record deal, I'm having fun again, so [the title] 'Cowboy's Back in Town' just made sense to me."

== Promotion ==
In promotion of the album, Adkins joined label-mate Toby Keith for his 2009 American Ride Tour. Adkins described his experience on the tour, saying "Touring with Toby last year changed my career, I got to see first hand that Toby and his organization place a premium on having fun and since that's what I got in this business for in the first place, this feels like the right place to be." He made television appearances on series such as the Today Show and The O'Reilly Factor on August 19, Fox & Friends on August 20. In addition, Adkins appeared on several late night talk shows including The Tonight Show with Jay Leno on September 14, Jimmy Kimmel Live! on September 15, Late Night with Jimmy Fallon on October 5, The Late Late Show with Craig Ferguson on October 12 and Chelsea Lately on October 19.

== Content ==
Vernell Hackett with The Boot commented on the record, saying "Trace combines his usual serious material with upbeat and slightly off-kilter tunes on the new disc." She described the track 'Don't Mind If I Don't,' as "a song using love as the perfect excuse to relax and take it easy."

== Critical reception ==
Professional ratings
Review scores
Source	Rating
Allmusic	3.5/5 stars
Associated Press	(favorable)
Billboard	(favorable)
Boston Herald	(favorable)
Country Weekly	3.5/5 stars
Entertainment Weekly	B
The New York Times	(mixed)
The Washington Post	(negative)

Upon its release, Cowboys Back in Town received generally positive reviews from most music critics. At Metacritic, which assigns a normalized rating out of 100 to reviews from mainstream critics, the album received an average score of 71, based on 4 reviews, which indicates "generally favorable reviews".

Thom Jurek with Allmusic said that Adkins was good at "offer tough[ing] utterly masculine, contemporary country-rock […] convincingly". Michael McCall with the Associated Press called the album "redneck humor and outlandish fun", he went to say that Adkins "could have drawn these songs from the comic routines of Larry the Cable Guy [...] But, this time out, Adkins is more salacious than sensitive — and makes it work for him".

Bill Brotherton with the Boston Herald commented that Adkins "has a heart. Who knew?" and thought that the "heartbreak" songs were the best. Whitney Pastorek with Entertainment Weekly gave the album a "B" rating, saying that Adkins is one of "Nashville's most likable baritones" and that the album "works best when he puts his heart into it, instead of just his hat". Ken Tucker with Country Weekly gave it three-and-a-half stars out of five, saying that it balanced the "rugged" material such as "Whoop a Man's Ass" with love songs as "Still Love You." He also thought that "Don't Mind If I Don't" was "uncharacteristically sunny" and suggested that the song could bring a new aspect to his sound.

Jon Caramanica with The New York Times compared Adkins negatively to Toby Keith, saying that Adkins "lacks the winking cheekiness and self-deprecation". He thought that "Ala-Freakin-Bama" and "Brown Chicken, Brown Cow" had a similarly "clumsy approach to sexuality" to "Honky Tonk Badonkadonk," and thought that the love songs were "mundane," but called "Hold My Beer" the album's high point. Allison Stewart with The Washington Post gave the album a negative review, saying that it was less "cartoonish" than his previous work, but said that songs, such as "Hold My Beer," were not meant to be enjoyed by female fans.

== Commercial performance ==
The album debuted at number five on the U.S. Billboard 200 selling 50,000 copies, being his first studio album since Dangerous Man in 2006 to chart in the top 10. It also became his fourth number one album on the U.S. Billboard Top Country Albums. As of the chart dated February 26, 2011, the album has sold 201,713 copies in the US.

== Track listing ==
Standard/CD/MP3 download
No.	Title	Writer(s)	Length
1.	"Brown Chicken Brown Cow"	Casey Beathard, Kenny Beard, Rivers Rutherford	3:25
2.	"Hold My Beer"	Beathard, Monty Criswell, Ed Hill	3:22
3.	"Cowboy's Back in Town"	Trace Adkins, Jeff Bates, Beard	3:25
4.	"This Ain't No Love Song"	Tony Lane, Marcel Chagnon, David Lee	3:18
5.	"Hell, I Can Do That"	Tony Martin, Lee Thomas Miller, Jim Collins	3:54
6.	"A Little Bit of Missin' You"	Mickey Jack Cones, Tim Johnson, Jim McCormick	3:36
7.	"Still Love You"	Robert Arthur, Bates, Kirk Roth	3:27
8.	"Don't Mind If I Don't" (feat. Trailer Choir)	Ashley Gorley, Luke Laird	3:34
9.	"Ala-Freakin-Bama"	Jay Speight, Scott Lynch	3:35
10.	"Break Her Fall"	Monty Criswell, Tim Mensy	3:38
11.	"Whoop a Man's Ass"	Beathard, Kendell Marvel	3:21
Total length:			38:47

Deluxe Edition
No.	Title	Writer(s)	Length
12.	"Happy Man"	Christian Kane, Brett James, David Lee Murphy	2:50
13.	"Between the Rainbows and the Rain"	Lane, James, Jess Brown	5:49
14.	"Pictures on Mantles"	Weston Harvey, Lynch, John Barner	4:08
15.	"Hillbilly Bone" (featuring Blake Shelton)	Laird, Craig Wiseman	3:43

== Personnel ==
- Trace Adkins – lead vocals
- David Angell – strings
- Adam Ayan – mastering
- Jeff Balding – engineer
- Kenny Beard – producer, production assistant, background vocals
- Steve Blackmon – assistant engineer
- Drew Bollman – mixing assistant
- Mike Brignardello – bass
- Jim "Moose" Brown – piano
- David Bryant – assistant engineer
- Pat Buchanan – electric guitar
- Perry Coleman – background vocals
- Peter Coleman – engineer
- Mickey Jack Cones – associate producer, editing, engineer, mixing, background vocals
- J. T. Corenflos – electric guitar
- Eric Darken – percussion
- David Davidson – strings
- Brandon Epps – editing
- Shelly Fairchild – background vocals
- Shawn Fichter – drums
- Tom Flora – background vocals
- Ashley Gorley – associate producer, background vocals
- Tony Harrell – clavinet, piano
- Wes Hightower – background vocals
- Jim Hoke – saxophone
- Mike Johnson – steel guitar, lap steel guitar
- Julian King – engineer
- Michael Knox – Producer, production assistant
- Jordan Lehning – engineer
- Kyle Lehning – mixing
- Sam Martin – assistant engineer
- Lee Moore – wardrobe
- Natalie Moore – art direction
- Greg Morrow – drums
- Justin Niebank – mixing
- Susannah Parrish – art direction, design
- Danny Rader – banjo, acoustic guitar
- Rich Redmond – percussion
- Sarighani Reist – strings
- Scotty Sanders – lap steel guitar, pedal steel guitar
- Adam Schoenfeld – electric guitar
- Jimmie Lee Sloas – bass
- Joe Spivey – fiddle, mandolin
- Pamela Springsteen – photography
- Russell Terrell – background vocals
- Trailer Choir – vocals on "Don't Mind If I Do"
- Biff Watson – acoustic guitar
- Kris Wilkinson – string arrangements, strings
- Debra Wingo-Williams – hair stylist, make-up
- John Willis – banjo, engineer

== Chart positions ==
=== Album ===
Chart (2010)	Peak position
U.S. Billboard Country Albums	1
U.S. Billboard 200	5

=== End of year charts ===
Chart (2010)	Year-end 2010
US Billboard Top Country Albums	45

=== Singles ===
Year	Single	Peak chart positions	
Year	Single	US Country	US
2010	"Ala-Freakin-Bama"	49	—
2010	"This Ain't No Love Song"	15	88
2011	"Brown Chicken Brown Cow"	39	—
"—" denotes releases that did not chart
