= Unconditional =

Unconditional or Unconditionally may refer to:

== Music ==
=== Albums ===
- Unconditional (Ana Popović album), 2011
- Unconditional (Clay Davidson album), 2000
- Unconditional (Kirk Whalum album), 2000
- Unconditional (Memphis May Fire album), 2014

=== Songs ===
- "Unconditional" (The Bravery song), 2005
- "Unconditional" (Clay Davidson song), 2000
- "Unconditional" (Jade Thirlwall song), 2025
- "Unconditional" (Ne-Yo song), 2012
- "Unconditional" (Peter Andre song), 2009
- "Unconditional", by Ana Popović from Unconditional, 2011
- "Unconditional", by Craig Davis from 22, 2022
- "Unconditional", by Foo Fighters from Your Favorite Toy, 2026
- "Unconditional", by Magdalena Bay from Mercurial World (Deluxe), 2021
- "Unconditional", by Sinéad Harnett, 2017
- "Unconditional", by Twlv, 2024

== Films ==
- Unconditional (2023 film), an American documentary film
- Unconditional (2012 film), a film starring Michael Ealy and Lynn Collins

== Other uses ==
- Unconditional basic income, another term for universal basic income
- Unconditional cash transfer, philanthropic programs aim to reduce poverty by providing financial welfare without any conditions upon the receivers' actions
- Unconditional love, affection without any limitations, or love without conditions
- Unconditional positive regard, the basic acceptance and support of a person regardless of what the person says or does
- Unconditional, a play by Brett C. Leonard performed by the LAByrinth Theater Company
- Unconditional (TV show), a 2026 Israeli series

== See also ==
- "Unconditionally", a 2013 song by Katy Perry
- "Unconditionally", a 1995 song by Extreme on the album Waiting for the Punchline
- "Unconditionally", a 2019 song by James Arthur on the album You
