= Rainbow Man =

Studio album by Jeff Bates
- Released: May 20, 2003
- Genre: Country
- Length: 36:44
- Label: RCA Nashville
- Producer: Kenny Beard, Scott Hendricks, David Malloy

Jeff Bates chronology
Rainbow Man (2003)	Leave the Light On (2006)

Professional ratings
Review scores
Source	Rating
Allmusic	3/5 stars
Country Standard Time	mixed
Entertainment Weekly	(A)

Rainbow Man is the debut studio album by American country music artist Jeff Bates. It was released in 2003 (see 2003 in country music) on RCA Nashville. The album includes eleven songs, all co-written by Bates, of which three were singles: "The Love Song", the title track, and "I Wanna Make You Cry". Respectively, these peaked at numbers 8, 47, and 23 on the Billboard country charts. "Long, Slow Kisses" was re-recorded for his next album, Leave the Light On, from which it was released as the lead-off single.

The album was produced by Kenny Beard and David Malloy, with additional production from Scott Hendricks on tracks 1, 4, and 6.

== Track listing ==
No.	Title	Writer(s)	Length
1.	"Country Enough"	Jeff Bates, Kenny Beard, Tim Owens	2:54
2.	"The Love Song"	Bates, Beard, Casey Beathard	4:05
3.	"Long, Slow Kisses"	Bates, Gordon Bradberry, Ben Hayslip	3:26
4.	"Lovin' Like That"	Bates, Beard, Jimmy Yeary	2:23
5.	"I Wanna Make You Cry"	Bates, Beard	3:15
6.	"Your Lovin' Talks to Me"	Bates, Byron Hill	3:21
7.	"My Mississippi"	Bates, Beard, Dave Loggins	4:28
8.	"Already Spent"	Bates, Terry Clayton	2:36
9.	"Rainbow Man"	Bates, Harley Allen	3:38
10.	"My In-Laws Are Outlaws"	Bates, Hill	3:00
11.	"The Wings of Mama's Prayers"	Bates, Clayton, Kris Bergsnes	3:33

== Personnel ==
- Jeff Bates – lead vocals
- Larry Beaird – acoustic guitar
- Mike Brignardello – bass guitar
- Mickey Jack Cones – background vocals
- Eric Darken – percussion
- Chip Davis – background vocals
- Larry Franklin – fiddle
- Paul Franklin – steel guitar
- Kevin "Swine" Grantt – bass guitar
- David Grissom – electric guitar
- Tony Harrell – keyboards, piano
- Aubrey Haynie – fiddle
- Mike Johnson – steel guitar
- Jeff King – electric guitar, slide guitar
- Troy Lancaster – electric guitar
- Michael Landau – electric guitar
- B. James Lowry – acoustic guitar
- Gordon Mote – Hammond organ, piano, synthesizer, synthesizer strings, Wurlitzer
- Jimmy Nichols – piano
- Joe Spivey – fiddle, mandolin
- Russell Terrell – background vocals
- John Willis – banjo, acoustic guitar
- Lonnie Wilson – drums, percussion
- Glenn Worf – bass guitar
- Jimmy Yeary – electric guitar
- Jonathan Yudkin – octophone, strings

== Chart performance ==
Chart (2003)	Peak position
U.S. Billboard Top Country Albums	14
U.S. Billboard 200	117
U.S. Billboard Top Heatseekers	1
