= Long, Slow Kisses =

Single by Jeff Bates

from the album Leave the Light On
- Released: 2004
- Genre: Country
- Length: 3:26 (original); 3:10 (re-recording)
- Label: RCA Nashville
- Songwriters: Jeff Bates; Gordon Bradberry; Ben Hayslip
- Producers: Kenny Beard and David Malloy (original); Kenny Beard and Blake Chancey (re-recording)

Jeff Bates singles chronology
"I Wanna Make You Cry" (2004)	"Long, Slow Kisses" (2004)	"Good People" (2005)

"Long, Slow Kisses" is a song recorded by American country music artist Jeff Bates. It was first included on his 2003 debut album Rainbow Man. Bates re-recorded the song in 2004 and released it as the first single from his second album, Leave the Light On. He co-wrote the song with Gordon Bradberry and Ben Hayslip.

== Critical reception ==
In his review of the album, Stephen Thomas Erlewine of Allmusic wrote that the song "stumbles in its attempts at seduction." Robert Loy of Country Standard Time was more positive, saying that "for such a young man, he certainly sounds as if he knows of whence he sings."

== Chart performance ==
"Long, Slow Kisses" debuted at number 56 on the U.S. Billboard Hot Country Singles & Tracks chart for the week of September 25, 2004.

Chart (2004–2005)	Peak position
US Hot Country Songs (Billboard)	17
US Billboard Bubbling Under Hot 100	5

=== Year-end charts ===
Chart (2005)	Position
US Country Songs (Billboard)	57
