= Leave the Light On (Jeff Bates album) =

Studio album by Jeff Bates
- Released: April 11, 2006
- Genre: Country
- Label: RCA Nashville
- Producer: Kenny Beard, Blake Chancey

Jeff Bates chronology
Rainbow Man (2003)	Leave the Light On (2006)	Jeff Bates (2008)

Professional ratings
Review scores
Source	Rating
Allmusic	link
Country Standard Time	favorable link

Leave the Light On is the second album by American country music artist Jeff Bates. Released on April 11, 2006 (see 2006 in country music), it includes the singles "Long, Slow Kisses" (a re-recording of a song originally found on his debut album Rainbow Man), "Good People", "No Shame" and "One Second Chance". Respectively, these reached numbers 17, 42, 45, and 59 on the Billboard country charts. Also covered here is Billy "Crash" Craddock's 1974 single "Rub It In".

== Track listing ==
1. "Long, Slow Kisses" (Jeff Bates, Gordon Bradberry, Ben Hayslip) – 3:10
2. "Rub It In" (Layng Martine, Jr.) – 3:05
3. "No Shame" (Bates, Kenny Beard, Jimmy Yeary) – 3:02
4. "Hands On Man" (Carson Chamberlain, Mark D. Sanders, Michael White) – 2:50
5. "Leave the Light On" (Beard, Yeary, Monty Criswell) – 3:28
6. "That'll Get You Ten" (Wade Kirby, Eric Church) – 3:59
7. "The Woman He Walked On" (Bob DiPiero, Mitzi Dawn Jenkins, Tony Mullins) – 3:05
8. "One Second Chance" (Arlis Albritton, Chris DuBois, Dave Turnbull) – 3:44
9. "Good People" (Tim James, Kendell Marvel) – 3:05
10. "I Can't Write That" (Bates, Beard, Billy Yates) – 3:55
11. "What I Know" (Beard, Casey Beathard) – 3:05
12. "Mama Was a Lot Like Jesus" (Rob Crosby, Kelly Shiver, Ray Stephenson) – 3:30

== Personnel ==
- Jeff Bates- acoustic guitar, electric guitar, lead vocals
- Kenny Beard- background vocals
- Joe Chemay- bass guitar
- Perry Coleman- background vocals
- Chad Cromwell- drums
- Eric Darken- percussion
- Chip Davis- background vocals
- Dan Dugmore- pedal steel guitar
- David Grissom- electric guitar
- Tony Harrell- keyboards
- Wes Hightower- background vocals
- Mike Johnson- pedal steel guitar
- Kyle Lehning- keyboards
- Liana Manis- background vocals
- Brent Mason- electric guitar
- Scott Neubert- acoustic guitar
- Billy Panda- acoustic guitar
- Joe Spivey- fiddle
- Cindy Richardson-Walker- background vocals
- Dennis Wilson- background vocals
- Casey Wood- percussion

== Chart performance ==
Chart (2006)	Peak position
U.S. Billboard Top Country Albums	12
U.S. Billboard 200	62
