= Jeff Bates (album) =

Studio album by Jeff Bates
- Released: April 8, 2008
- Genre: Country
- Label: Black River
- Producer: Kenny Beard, Jimmy Nichols

Jeff Bates chronology
Leave the Light On (2006)	Jeff Bates (2008)

Professional ratings
Review scores
Source	Rating
Country Weekly	link
Country Standard Time	link

Jeff Bates is the self-titled third album from American country music artist Jeff Bates. Released in April 2008 on the independent label Black River Entertainment, it has accounted for three non-charting singles: "Don't Hate Me for Lovin' You", "Riverbank" and "One Thing". Bates co-wrote ten of the thirteen songs on the album. Despite not producing a charting single, it peaked at #32 on Top Country Albums.

== Track listing ==
1. "I Can't Have Nothing Nice" (Jeff Bates, Ben Hayslip, Brandon Kinney) – 3:34
2. "Lonesome" (Kenny Beard, Casey Beathard, Frank Rogers) – 4:15
3. "One Thing" (Bates, Jason Matthews, Jim McCormick) – 3:21
4. "A Country Girl Can" (Bates, Hayslip, Matthews) – 3:06
5. "Riverbank" (Bates, Robert Arthur, Kirk Roth) – 3:43
6. "Chevy Don't Let Me Down" (Bates, Hayslip, Jimmy Yeary) – 3:07
7. "Don't Hate Me for Lovin' You" (Bates, Yeary, Kemi Williams, Lonnie Wilson) – 3:25
8. "My Wave" (Hayslip, Yeary) – 4:04
9. "Some Days" (Bates, Beard, Hayslip) – 2:52
10. "He Wasn't Like Us" (Bates, Hayslip, Kinney) – 3:51
11. "Dead or Alive" (Bates, Arthur, Roth) – 3:14
12. "Country Man" (Bates, Beard, Yeary) – 3:27
13. "Somebody's Falling" (Beard, Deborah Allen, Paul Overstreet) – 3:21

== Personnel ==
- Jeff Bates- lead vocals
- Eddie Bayers- drums
- Kenny Beard- background vocals
- Mike Brignardello- bass guitar
- Mickey Jack Cones- background vocals
- Aly Cutter- background vocals
- Glen Duncan- fiddle, mandolin
- Larry Franklin- fiddle
- Paul Franklin- steel guitar
- Tommy Harden- percussion
- Buddy Hyatt- piano
- Mike Johnson- steel guitar
- Wayne Killius- drums
- Jeff King- acoustic guitar, electric guitar
- Troy Lancaster- electric guitar
- Gordon Mote- keyboards, piano
- Jimmy Nichols- keyboards, Hammond organ, piano, strings, synthesizer, background vocals
- Danny Parks- acoustic guitar
- Scotty Sanders- steel guitar
- Joe Spivey- fiddle
- Bobby Terry- acoustic guitar
- Biff Watson- acoustic guitar
- Lonnie Wilson- drums

== Chart performance ==
Chart (2008)	Peak position
U.S. Billboard Top Country Albums	32
U.S. Billboard Independent Albums	37
