= 2009 AAA 400 =

Race details
- Race 28 of 36 in the 2009 NASCAR Sprint Cup Series
- The 2009 AAA 400 program cover, with artwork by Sam Bass. "Monster Mash!"
- Date: September 27, 2009
- Location: Dover International Speedway, Dover, Delaware
- Course: Permanent racing facility
- Course length: 1.0 miles (1.609 km)
- Distance: 400 laps, 400 mi (643.737 km)
- Weather: Temperatures reaching up to 75.2 °F (24.0 °C); wind speeds up to 11.1 miles per hour (17.9 km/h)
- Average speed: 118.704 miles per hour (191.036 km/h)

Pole position
Driver	Jimmie Johnson	Hendrick Motorsports
- Time: 22.878

Most laps led
Driver	Jimmie Johnson	Hendrick Motorsports
- Laps: 271

Winner
No. 48	Jimmie Johnson	Hendrick Motorsports

Television in the United States
- Network: ESPN
- Announcers: Jerry Punch, Dale Jarrett and Andy Petree
- Nielsen ratings: 3.1/6 (Final); 2.7/5 (Overnight); (5.08 million)

The 2009 AAA 400 was the twenty-eighth stock car race of the 2009 NASCAR Sprint Cup Series and the second in the ten-race season-ending Chase for the Sprint Cup. It was held on September 27, 2009, at Dover International Speedway, in Dover, Delaware before a crowd of 110,000 people. The 400-lap race was won by Jimmie Johnson of the Hendrick Motorsports team after he started from pole position. His teammate Mark Martin finished second and Roush Fenway Racing driver Matt Kenseth was third.

Martin was the pre-race Drivers' Championship leader with a 35-point margin over Johnson and Denny Hamlin in second. Johnson won the pole position with the fastest overall lap time in the qualifying session and maintained his lead on the first lap to begin the race. After a competition caution to allow for tire checks on lap 25, Ryan Newman became the leader of the race. Chase for the Sprint Cup participants Kurt Busch and Jeff Gordon were in the top ten for most of the race. Johnson reclaimed the lead, after passing Kurt Busch on the 176th lap. Johnson maintained the first position to lead the most laps of 271, and to win his fourth race of the season. There were nine cautions and six lead changes among four different drivers during the course of the race.

The race victory was Johnson's fourth of the 2009 season, as well as the forty-fourth of his career. The result kept Martin in the lead in the Drivers' Championship, ten points ahead of Johnson, and sixty-five in front of Juan Pablo Montoya. Chevrolet maintained its lead in the Manufacturers' Championship, forty-five ahead of Toyota and seventy-five in front of Ford, who bumped Dodge, with one-hundred and twenty-two points, to fourth place. The race attracted 5.08 million television viewers.

== Background ==
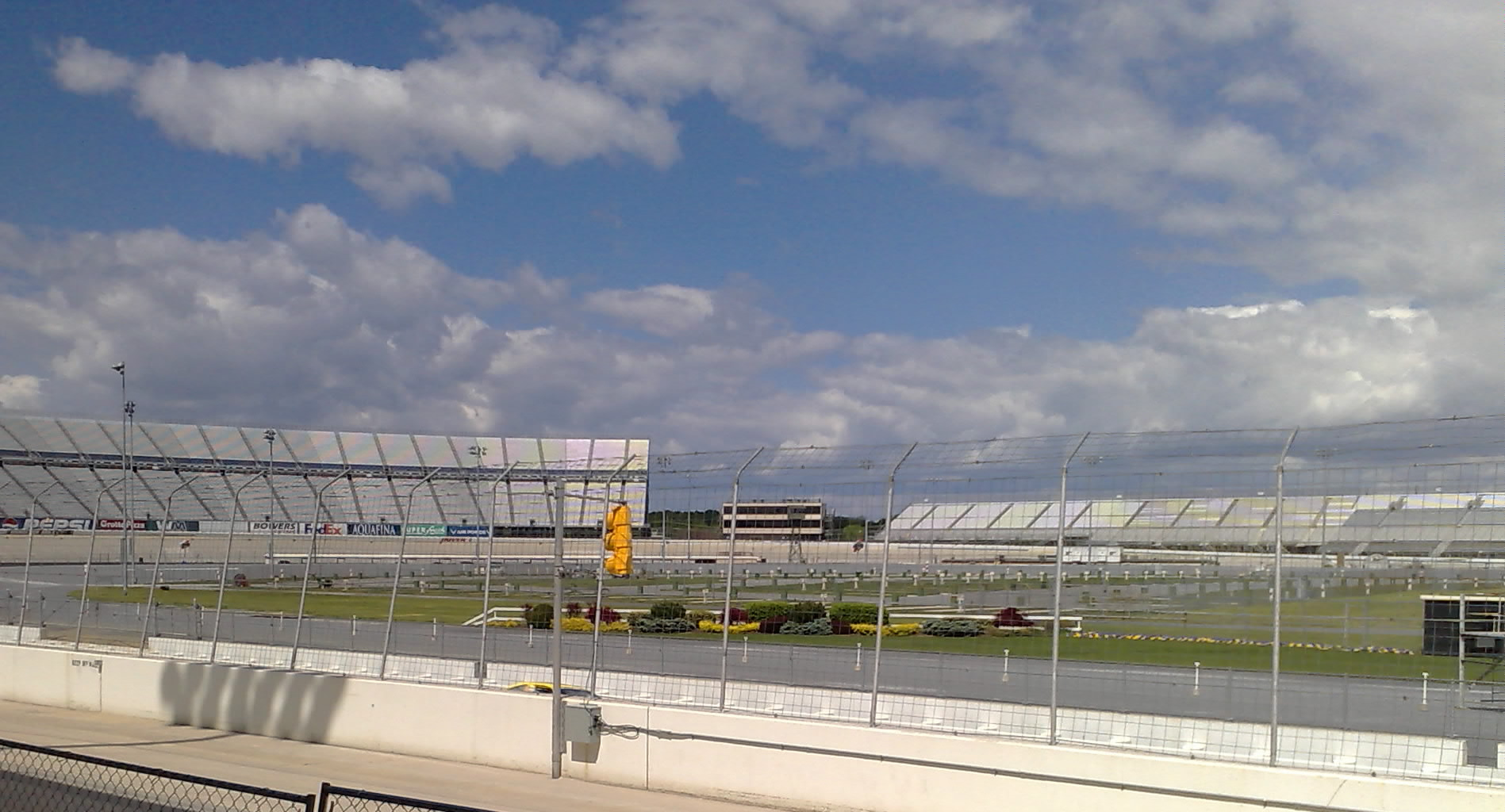
Dover International Speedway, where the race was held.

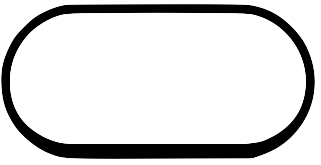
The layout of Dover International Speedway, the venue where the race was held.

The 2009 AAA 400 was the twenty-eighth of thirty-six scheduled stock car races of the 2009 NASCAR Sprint Cup Series and the second in the ten-race season-ending Chase for the Sprint Cup. It took place on September 27, 2009, in Dover, Delaware, at Dover International Speedway, a short track that holds NASCAR races. The NASCAR race makes use of the track's standard configuration, a four-turn short track oval that is 1 mile (1.6 km) long. The track's turns are banked at twenty-four degrees, and both the front stretch (the location of the finish line) and the backstretch are banked at nine degrees.

Before the race, Mark Martin led the Drivers' Championship with 5,230 points; Jimmie Johnson and Denny Hamlin were tied for second with 5,195 points each, 35 points behind Martin. Juan Pablo Montoya was fourth with 5,175 points, ten ahead of Kurt Busch and nineteen ahead of Tony Stewart in fifth and sixth respectively. Ryan Newman with 5,151 was eleven points ahead of Brian Vickers, as Greg Biffle with 5,138 points, was ten ahead of Jeff Gordon. Carl Edwards and Kasey Kahne rounded out the top twelve positions in the Chase for the Sprint Cup with 5,117 and 5,069 points respectively. In the Manufacturers' Championship, Chevrolet was leading with 199 points, thirty-nine points ahead of their rivals Toyota in second place. Dodge, with 118 points, were one point ahead of Ford in the battle for third place. Johnson was the race's defending champion.

Johnson had finished first in the Autism Speaks 400 at Dover earlier in the season, and he entered the AAA 400, an event that thought he had the opportunity to win, as optimistic. He thought that track evolution and significant to car balances would make for better racing for the event. His teammate Martin, who won the preceding Sylvania 300 at New Hampshire Motor Speedway, said he hoped to drive fast and win the race at Dover but stressed the importance of avoiding getting overexcited, "There's a lot of stuff left to happen and a lot of racing left to happen. Don't get carried away". After finishing third at New Hampshire, Montoya acknowledged he and his team's lack of experience of being in the Chase for the Sprint Cup and said that he had to perform to the best of his ability, "There's no holding back, nothing, we have to go... We are doing the best we can and hopefully we are going to be good enough to at least fight for it"

== Practice and qualifying ==
Three practice sessions were held before the Sunday race—one on Friday, and two on Saturday. The first session lasted 90 minutes, and the second 45 minutes. The final session lasted 60 minutes. In the first practice session, Johnson was fastest by setting a lap of 22.781 seconds, placing ahead of Newman in second and Montoya in third. Biffle took fourth position and Kurt Busch placed fifth. A. J. Allmendinger, David Reutimann, Kevin Harvick, Martin and David Gilliland rounded out the top ten fastest drivers in the session. During the session, Bowyer broke a rocker arm, and his team changed engines as a consequence.

There were forty-four drivers entered in the qualifier on Friday afternoon; according to NASCAR's qualifying procedure, forty-three were allowed to race. Each driver ran two laps, with the starting order determined by the competitor's fastest times. Johnson clinched the 21st pole position of his career, with a lap of 22.878 seconds that he recorded at his first attempt. He was joined on the grid's front row by Montoya who held pole position until Johnson's lap. Newman qualified third, Biffle took fourth and Reutimann started fifth. Kahne, Gordon, Bowyer, Sam Hornish Jr. and Paul Menard completed the top ten positions. The driver that failed to qualify was Scott Wimmer, who set the slowest overall lap time. During qualifying, Elliott Sadler's changed his car's engine, after one failed during the session. After the qualifier Johnson said, "A pole today will make the start of the weekend much better and give us a lot of direction and momentum moving into tomorrow, It does carry you, and there is an aspect of momentum. But at the same time, you've got to go out and perform."

On Saturday morning, Kurt Busch was fastest in the second practice session with a time of 23.524 seconds, ahead of Montoya in second, and Newman in third. Johnson was fourth quickest, and Bowyer took fifth. Kyle Busch managed sixth. Stewart, Hamlin, Matt Kenseth and Gilliland followed in the top ten. Of the other drivers in the Chase, Biffle finished with the eleventh fastest time, while Kahne set the fourteenth fastest time. Kahne set the fastest time of 23.682 seconds in the final practice session, while Montoya and Joey Logano followed in second and third respectively. Martin was fourth quickest, ahead of Biffle and Johnson. Kurt Busch was seventh fastest, Jamie McMurray eighth, Gilliland ninth and Martin Truex Jr. tenth. Other chase drivers included Newman in eleventh and Hamlin in eighteenth.

=== Qualifying results ===
Grid	Car	Driver	Team	Manufacturer	Time	Speed
1	48	Jimmie Johnson	Hendrick Motorsports	Chevrolet	22.878	157.356
2	42	Juan Pablo Montoya	Earnhardt Ganassi Racing	Chevrolet	22.974	156.699
3	39	Ryan Newman	Stewart–Haas Racing	Chevrolet	23.019	156.393
4	16	Greg Biffle	Roush Fenway Racing	Ford	23.035	156.284
5	00	David Reutimann	Michael Waltrip Racing	Toyota	23.080	155.979
6	9	Kasey Kahne	Evernham Motorsports	Dodge	23.096	155.871
7	24	Jeff Gordon	Hendrick Motorsports	Chevrolet	23.110	155.777
8	33	Clint Bowyer	Richard Childress Racing	Chevrolet	23.143	155.555^{1}
9	77	Sam Hornish Jr.	Team Penske	Dodge	23.152	155.494
10	98	Paul Menard	Robert Yates Racing	Ford	23.161	155.434
11	20	Joey Logano	Joe Gibbs Racing	Toyota	23.170	155.373
12	83	Brian Vickers	Red Bull Racing Team	Toyota	23.173	155.353
13	11	Denny Hamlin	Joe Gibbs Racing	Toyota	23.197	155.193
14	5	Mark Martin	Hendrick Motorsports	Chevrolet	23.219	155.045
15	18	Kyle Busch	Joe Gibbs Racing	Toyota	23.227	154.992
16	2	Kurt Busch	Penske Championship Racing	Dodge	23.240	154.905
17	12	David Stremme	Penske Racing	Dodge	23.251	154.832
18	71	David Gilliland	TRG Motorsports	Chevrolet	23.280	154.639
19	44	A. J. Allmendinger	Richard Petty Motorsports	Dodge	23.281	154.633
20	29	Kevin Harvick	Richard Childress Racing	Chevrolet	23.285	154.606
21	6	David Ragan	Roush Fenway Racing	Ford	23.290	154.573
22	14	Tony Stewart	Stewart–Haas Racing	Chevrolet	23.296	154.533
23	17	Matt Kenseth	Roush Fenway Racing	Ford	23.304	154.480
24	88	Dale Earnhardt Jr.	Hendrick Motorsports	Chevrolet	23.315	154.407
25	26	Jamie McMurray	Roush Fenway Racing	Ford	23.333	154.288
26	43	Reed Sorenson	Richard Petty Motorsports	Dodge	23.356	154.136
27	47	Marcos Ambrose	JTG Daugherty Racing	Toyota	23.366	154.070
28	31	Jeff Burton	Richard Childress Racing	Chevrolet	23.395	153.879
29	07	Casey Mears	Richard Childress Racing	Chevrolet	23.406	153.807
30	99	Carl Edwards	Roush Fenway Racing	Ford	23.444	153.557
31	7	Robby Gordon	Robby Gordon Motorsports	Toyota	23.462	153.440
32	1	Martin Truex Jr.	Earnhardt Ganassi Racing	Chevrolet	23.470	153.387
33	78	Regan Smith	Furniture Row Racing	Chevrolet	23.497	153.211
34	19	Elliott Sadler	Richard Petty Motorsports	Dodge	23.513	153.107^{1}
35	66	Dave Blaney	Prism Motorsports	Toyota	23.518	153.074
36	09	Mike Bliss	Phoenix Racing	Dodge	23.525	153.029
37	34	John Andretti	Front Row Motorsports	Chevrolet	23.539	152.938
38	55	Michael Waltrip	Michael Waltrip Racing	Toyota	23.549	152.873
39	82	Scott Speed	Red Bull Racing Team	Toyota	23.588	152.620
40	87	Joe Nemechek	NEMCO Motorsports	Toyota	23.677	152.046
41	96	Bobby Labonte	Hall of Fame Racing	Ford	23.684	152.001
42	37	Tony Raines	Front Row Motorsports	Dodge	23.755	151.547^{1}
43	36	Michael McDowell	Prism Motorsports	Toyota	23.780	151.388
Failed to qualify
44	4	Scott Wimmer	Morgan-McClure Motorsports	Chevrolet	24.121	149.247
^{1} Moved to the back of the field for changing engines

== Race ==
The race commenced at 2:17 p.m. and was televised live in the United States on ESPN. Commentary was provided by Jerry Punch, Dale Jarrett, and Andy Petree. Around the start of the race, weather conditions were cloudy with the air temperature 71 °F (22 °C); a moderate chance of rain was forecast. Pastor Dan Schafer began pre-race ceremonies by giving the invocation. Country music group and Show Dog-Universal Music recording artists Trailer Choir performed the national anthem, and Sergeant Major John Jones of the Pennsylvania National Guard gave the command for drivers to start their engines. During the pace laps, Bowyer, Sadler and Tony Raines all had to move to the rear of the grid because of them changing their engines. NASCAR announced that a competition caution would take place on lap 25 to allow teams to check tire wear as a result of rain falling on the circuit overnight that removed most of the rubber laid down, meaning drivers would make mandatory pit stops. This also meant that teams would not be permitted to refuel their vehicles.

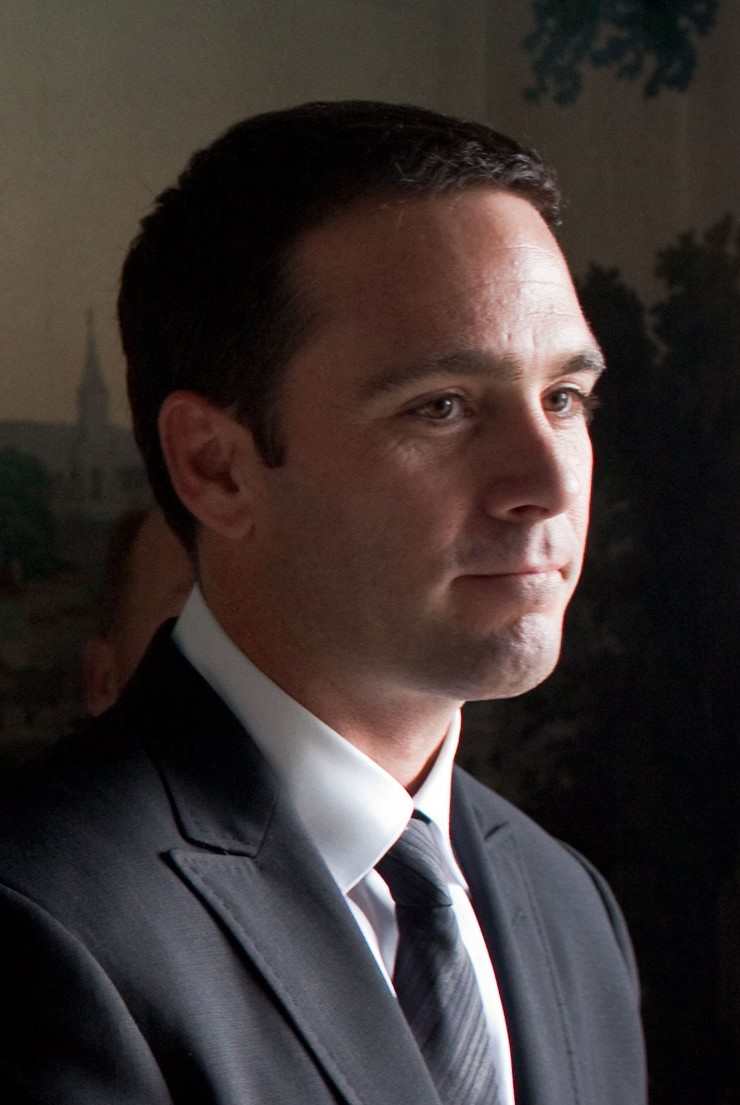
Jimmie Johnson won pole position and the race.

Johnson maintained his pole position lead into the first corner. One lap later, Newman passed Montoya for the second position. After starting the race in twelfth, Martin had lost four positions to run eighteenth by lap four. By the tenth lap, Johnson had built up a 1.2 second lead over Newman. Bowyer, who began the race at the rear of the grid, had moved up thirteen positions to twenty-ninth by lap 15. Two laps later, Raines drove to his garage. On lap 18, Kurt Busch passed Vickers for ninth, as Kahne claimed fourth position from Biffle, two laps later. On lap 27, the competition caution came out. Many competitors chose to have two tires installed to their cars during their pit stops. During the caution, all of the leaders made pit stops; Gilliland became the new leader on lap 28. After pit stops, Newman claimed the first position and held it at the restart.

On lap 31, a multi-car collision occurred in turn three as Logano slowed to avoid colliding with Bobby Labonte and Stewart hit Logano's rear-end, causing Logano to go down into the infield grass before going back up the circuit. Logano was then struck by Reed Sorenson and went into the turn three barrier, causing Logano to barrel roll sideways multiple times before resting sideways on the apron and then falling back onto its wheels. Logano was unharmed, and he exited his vehicle and boarded an ambulance. He was treated and then released from the infield care center. Stewart's car sustained damage to the right-front and right-rear quarters to his car. The accident, which collected also Truex and Robby Gordon, prompted the second caution. On the following lap, the red flag was shown to allow race officials to clear the track of debris. The race was restarted 23 minutes and 38 seconds later under caution. Newman maintained his lead at the restart, followed by Kurt Busch and Menard. Three laps later, Montoya and Gordon passed Menard for fifth and sixth respectively. On lap 43, Jeff Burton fell to ninth after being passed by Hamlin and Martin. Four laps later, Martin passed Hamlin for the thirteenth position.

By lap 50, Johnson passed Reutimann to move back into the top ten. On lap 58, Kurt Busch passed Newman to claim the lead. Three laps later, Jeff Gordon claimed fifth position off Kahne, while Menard was passed by Johnson for eighth. On lap 63, Montoya moved into the third position after passing Biffle, while Gilliland went to his garage to retire from the race. Two laps later, Kyle Busch claimed seventh position off Kahne, as Montoya passed Newman for second on lap 66. On lap 67, Gordon and Biffle passed Newman for third and fourth positions. Four laps later, Johnson claimed seventh from Kahne. On lap 80, Reutimann ran out of fuel, forcing him to make a pit stop.

On lap 83, Biffle was passed by Johnson for the fourth position. One lap later, the right-front tire on Michael Waltrip's car failed and he collided with the two barrier, causing the third caution. All of the leaders elected to make pit stops. Kurt Busch remained the leader at the restart on the 90th lap, ahead of Biffle and Kyle Busch. Kyle Busch passed Biffle for third position four laps later, while McMurray was passed by Kahne for ninth on lap 96. Three laps later, Biffle dropped to sixth after being passed by Jeff Gordon, as Montoya passed Kyle Busch for the third position on lap 113. Sixteen laps later, Kahne passed Jeff Gordon for sixth, while Stewart moved into the eighteenth position on lap 137. On the 147th lap, Kurt Busch was blocked by Labonte, allowing Johnson to claim the lead. By the 150th lap, Kyle Busch dropped three positions to sixth after being passed by Martin, Kahne and Jeff Gordon.

Green flag pit stops began on lap 152, when Hornish made a pit stop. Twelve laps later, the fourth caution came out. During the caution, which was caused by liquid on the track, all of the leaders made pit stops. Kurt Busch reclaimed the lead for the lap 169 restart. Stewart moved into the eleventh position on lap 170. Six laps later, Johnson reclaimed the lead off Kurt Busch. By the 183rd lap, Johnson opened out a 1.6 second lead over Kurt Busch. Twenty-four laps later, Kyle Busch collided with the wall in turns three and turn four, prompting the fifth caution. All of the leaders chose to make pit stops during the caution. The race resumed on lap 212, with Johnson leading from Jeff Gordon and Kurt Busch.

By the 223rd lap, Johnson had a lead of 1.6 seconds. Twenty-seven laps later, Sorenson rejoined the race track. On lap 252, Stewart passed Allmendinger for the ninth position. Seven laps later, Stewart moved into eighth after passing Newman, and passed Bowyer for seventh on the 262nd lap. On lap 273, Johnson's lead of 3.5 seconds was reduced to nothing when the pace car moved on track. During the caution, which was caused by David Stremme making contact with the wall at turn four, all of the leaders made pit stops. Johnson remained the leader at the restart on lap 278. On lap 286, Kahne was passed by Newman for ninth. By lap 290, Johnson built up a lead of two seconds. Seventeen laps later, Martin passed Kenseth for the fourth position. Johnson's lead had increased to 2.2 seconds by lap 319. Five laps later, debris was spotted on the track and the seventh caution was prompted. All of the leaders elected to make pit stops during the caution.

Johnson maintained his lead at the restart, followed by Martin and Kenseth. One lap later, Montoya moved into the second position, as Martin fell to fifth. On lap 336, Martin moved into fourth after passing Kurt Busch, and passed Kenseth for third two laps later. On lap 342, the eighth caution came out when Regan Smith spun off the fourth turn, collecting Stremme, Truex and Sadler. As light began to fade, Johnson kept the lead at the lap 348 restart. One lap later, Kenseth moved into the second position, as Stewart and Gordon moved into fourth and tenth respectively. Gordon passed Newman for ninth on the 349th lap, before falling to eleventh position after contact with Newman one lap later. Stewart was passed by Martin for the fourth position on lap 354, as Johnson had built a 2.2 second lead by lap 357. One lap later, Jeff Gordon moved into the ninth position after passing Newman.

On the 368th lap, Hornish, spun on the backstraightaway, prompting the ninth and final caution of the race. During the caution, some of the leaders made pit stops. Johnson maintained the lead on lap 373. Four laps later, Newman passed Mears for eighth, as Edwards was passed by Stewart for twelfth. On the 383rd lap, Kahne, Allemndinger and Stewart passed Newman for seventh, eighth and ninth respectively. On the following lap, Kenseth was overtaken by Martin for the second position. On the 391st lap, Kahne was passed by Allmendinger for the second position. Two laps later, Johnson's lead had increased to 2.2 seconds and held it to win the race. Martin finished second, ahead of Kenseth in third, Montoya fourth, and Kurt Busch fifth. Gordon, Allmendinger, Kahne, Stewart and Newman rounded out the top ten finishers. There were six lead changes among four different drivers over the course of the race. Johnson led three times for a total of 271 laps, more than any other driver.

=== Post-race ===
As far as sending a message, I hope it does. I hope people are worried."

— Johnson, speaking after the race.

Johnson appeared in victory lane to celebrate his fourth victory of the season in front of 110,000 people who attended the race, earning $276,076 in race winnings. Afterward, he said, "I woke up (on Sunday) morning very optimistic. By about lap two or three I knew we had a very balanced car and we'd be competitive all day long, get a solid finish.", he continued, "I see guys get so worried about what other people think, what other people say and spend a lot of time in those areas. That's not what works for me. (I) don't watch television; don't watch or read any of the trade papers or magazines. Just ignore, ignore, ignore and focus on my world and what's going on with my race car. That's what I'll do through the rest of the Chase."

Martin, who finished second, was candid about the result, "We did really well to finish second. I just don't think we were in [Johnson's] league today." In the post-race press conference, Kenseth said of his result, "We didn't qualify very good, but we were really happy with our car. When the race started, I didn't think we were quite as good as we were yesterday (in practice), but we were able to have really good pit stops." Hamlin had struggled with a poor-handling vehicle and expressed his team's disappointment with his result due to the lack of speed in his car, saying; "We definitely came out here thinking we could win the race just like any other weekend, but as soon as the green flag fell, I knew we were in trouble." Logano, who was involved in the biggest accident of the race, "The biggest thing was, I was fine the whole time, [but] I'm not really sure what happened. The spotter was clearing me low. When I got down there, they checked up going into the corner and I got tagged from behind." Stewart commented on his collision with Logano, "I've never felt sicker in my life than when we hit Joey like that. We hit him a ton. I didn't see it coming. That was the worst part."

The race result kept Martin in the lead of the Drivers' Championship with 5,400 points. Johnson, who won the race, stood in second, ten points behind Martin, and sixty-five ahead of Montoya. Kurt Busch moved into fourth position with 5,325 points. Stewart with fifth, Hamlin sixth, and Newman, Jeff Gordon, Biffle and Vickers followed in the top-ten positions. The final two positions available in the Chase for the Sprint Cup were occupied by Edwards in eleventh and Kahne in twelfth. In the Manufacturers' Championship, Chevrolet maintained their lead with 208. Toyota remained second with 163. Ford followed with 123 points, one point ahead of Dodge in fourth. 5.08 million people watched the race on television. The race took three hours, twenty-two minutes and eleven seconds to complete, and the margin of victory was 1.970 seconds.

=== Race results ===
Pos	Car	Driver	Team	Manufacturer	Laps run	Points
1	48	Jimmie Johnson	Hendrick Motorsports	Chevrolet	400	195^{2}
2	5	Mark Martin	Hendrick Motorsports	Chevrolet	400	170
3	17	Matt Kenseth	Roush Fenway Racing	Ford	400	165
4	42	Juan Pablo Montoya	Earnhardt Ganassi Racing	Chevrolet	400	160
5	2	Kurt Busch	Penske Championship Racing	Dodge	400	160^{1}
6	24	Jeff Gordon	Hendrick Motorsports	Chevrolet	400	150
7	44	A.J. Allemdinger	Richard Petty Motorsports	Dodge	400	146
8	9	Kasey Kahne	Evernham Motorsports	Dodge	400	142
9	14	Tony Stewart	Stewart–Haas Racing	Chevrolet	400	138
10	39	Ryan Newman	Stewart–Haas Racing	Chevrolet	400	139^{1}
11	99	Carl Edwards	Roush Fenway Racing	Ford	400	130
12	29	Kevin Harvick	Richard Childress Racing	Chevrolet	400	127
13	16	Greg Biffle	Roush Fenway Racing	Ford	400	124
14	47	Marcos Ambrose	JTG Daugherty Racing	Toyota	400	121
15	33	Clint Bowyer	Richard Childress Racing	Chevrolet	400	118
16	31	Jeff Burton	Richard Childress Racing	Chevrolet	400	115
17	07	Casey Mears	Richard Childress Racing	Chevrolet	400	112
18	83	Brian Vickers	Red Bull Racing Team	Toyota	400	109
19	98	Paul Menard	Robert Yates Racing	Ford	400	106
20	88	Dale Earnhardt Jr.	Hendrick Motorsports	Chevrolet	399	103
21	00	David Reutimann	Michael Waltrip Racing	Toyota	398	100
22	11	Denny Hamlin	Joe Gibbs Racing	Toyota	398	97
23	96	Bobby Labonte	Hall of Fame Racing	Ford	398	94
24	6	David Ragan	Roush Fenway Racing	Ford	396	91
25	82	Scott Speed	Red Bull Racing Team	Toyota	396	88
26	77	Sam Hornish Jr.	Team Penske	Dodge	395	85
27	34	John Andretti	Front Row Motorsports	Chevrolet	395	82
28	26	Jamie McMurray	Roush Fenway Racing	Ford	394	79
29	12	David Stremme	Penske Racing	Dodge	385	76
30	19	Elliott Sadler	Richard Petty Motorsports	Dodge	353	73
31	18	Kyle Busch	Joe Gibbs Racing	Toyota	342	70
32	78	Regan Smith	Furniture Row Racing	Chevrolet	337	67
33	1	Martin Truex Jr.	Earnhardt Ganassi Racing	Chevrolet	251	64
34	7	Robby Gordon	Robby Gordon Motorsports	Toyota	181	61
35	43	Reed Sorenson	Richard Petty Motorsports	Dodge	170	58
36	55	Michael Waltrip	Michael Waltrip Racing	Toyota	84	55
37	66	Dave Blaney	Prism Motorsports	Toyota	76	52
38	36	Michael McDowell	Prism Motorsports	Toyota	74	49
39	71	David Gilliland	TRG Motorsports	Chevrolet	60	51^{1}
40	09	Mike Bliss	Phoenix Racing	Dodge	54	43
41	87	Joe Nemechek	NEMCO Motorsports	Toyota	51	40
42	20	Joey Logano	Joe Gibbs Racing	Toyota	30	37
43	37	Tony Raines	Front Row Motorsports	Dodge	13	34
^{1} Includes five bonus points for leading a lap
^{2} Includes ten bonus points for leading the most laps

== Standings after the race ==
Drivers' Championship standings

Pos	+/–	Driver	Points
1		Mark Martin	5,400
2		Jimmie Johnson	5,390 (−10)
3	1	Juan Pablo Montoya	5,335 (−65)
4	1	Kurt Busch	5,325 (−75)
5	1	Tony Stewart	5,294 (−106)
6	3	Denny Hamlin	5,292 (−108)
7		Ryan Newman	5,290 (−110)
8	2	Jeff Gordon	5,278 (−122)
9		Greg Biffle	5,262 (−138)
10	2	Brian Vickers	5,249 (−151)
11		Carl Edwards	5,247 (−153)
12		Kasey Kahne	5,211 (−189)

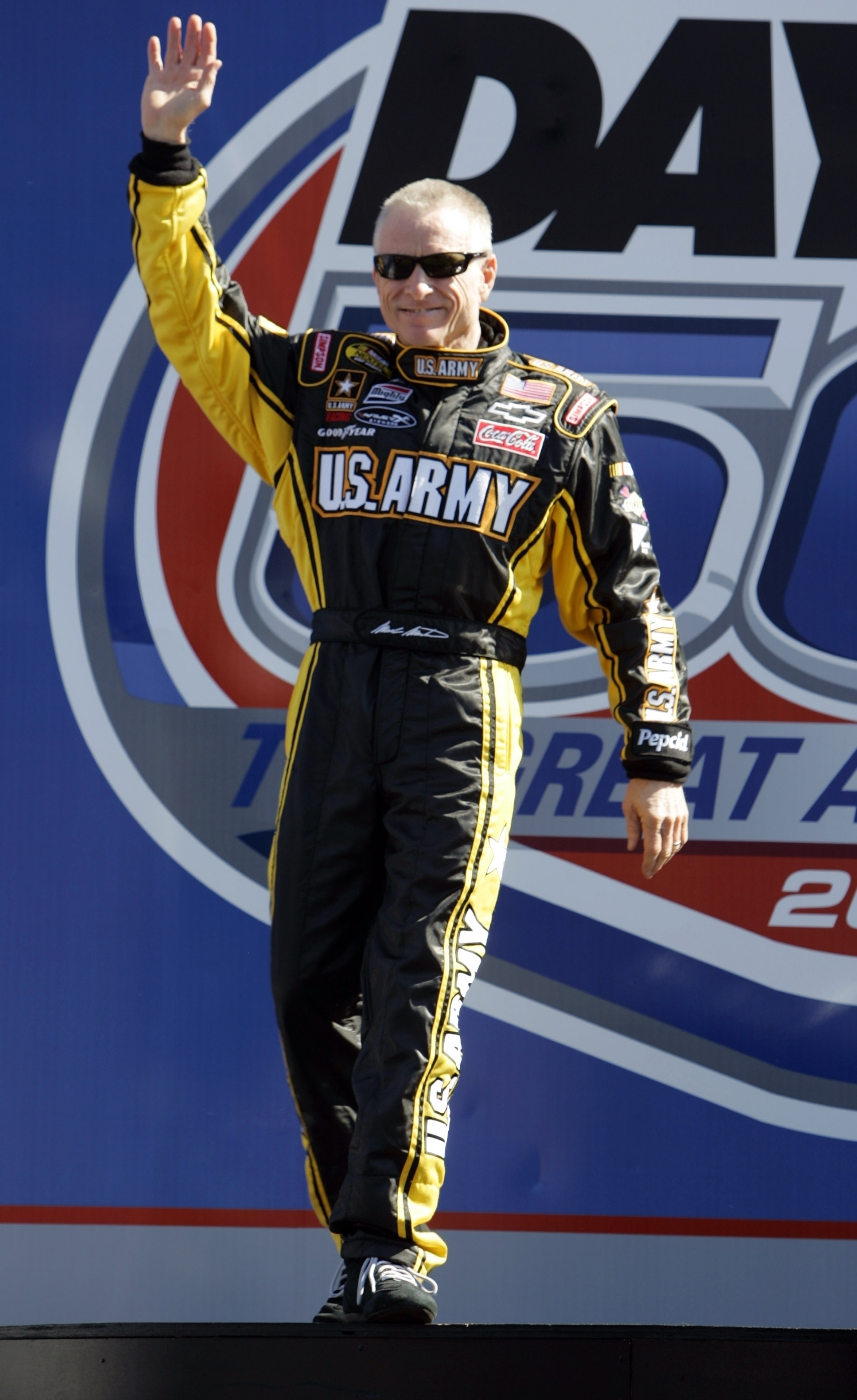
Mark Martin remained the points leader with 5,400 points, after finishing second in the race.

Manufacturers' Championship standings

Pos	+/–	Manufacturer	Points
1		Chevrolet	208
2		Toyota	163 (−45)
3	1	Ford	123 (−85)
4	1	Dodge	122 (−86)

- Note: Only the top twelve positions are included for the driver standings. These drivers qualified for the Chase for the Sprint Cup.

Previous race: 2009 Sylvania 300	Sprint Cup Series; 2009 season	Next race: 2009 Price Chopper 400
