= Deryl Dodd (album) =

Studio album by Deryl Dodd
- Released: November 24, 1998
- Genre: Country
- Length: 31:56
- Label: Columbia Nashville
- Producer: Chip Young, Blake Chancey

Deryl Dodd chronology
One Ride in Vegas (1996)	Deryl Dodd (1998)	Pearl Snaps (2002)

Deryl Dodd is the second studio album by American country music artist Deryl Dodd. It was released on November 24, 1998, via Columbia Nashville. The album includes the singles "A Bitter End", "Good Idea Tomorrow" and "John Roland Wood".

== Critical reception ==
Jana Pendragon of AllMusic praised the album for having a more neotraditional country sound than his first album.

== Track listing ==
No.	Title	Writer(s)	Length
1.	"It's Only 'Cause You're Lonely"	Clay Blaker, Jim Lauderdale	2:45
2.	"Best I Ever Had"	Stowe Dailey, Deryl Dodd, Kim Williams	3:51
3.	"Bad for Good"	Brett Beavers, Jim Beavers	2:48
4.	"A Bitter End"	Kenny Beard, Dodd	3:40
5.	"John Roland Wood"	Troy Jones	2:39
6.	"30-30"	Dodd, Bryan Kennedy	3:28
7.	"I Thought I'd Heard It All"	Dodd, Don Pfrimmer	3:30
8.	"Good Idea Tomorrow"	Dodd	3:02
9.	"On Any Given Day"	Gerald Boyd, Billy Henderson, Steven Dale Jones	3:34
10.	"Somewhere Down the Road"	Dodd, Pfrimmer	2:38

== Chart performance ==
Chart (1999)	Peak position
US Top Country Albums (Billboard)	63
