= I Wanna Make You Cry =

Single by Jeff Bates

from the album Rainbow Man
- Released: January 24, 2004
- Genre: Country
- Length: 3:15
- Label: RCA Nashville
- Songwriter(s): Jeff Bates, Kenny Beard
- Producer(s): Kenny Beard, David Malloy

Jeff Bates singles chronology
"Rainbow Man" (2003)	"I Wanna Make You Cry" (2004)	"Long, Slow Kisses" (2004)

"I Wanna Make You Cry" is a song co-written and recorded by American country music artist Jeff Bates. It was released in January 2004 as the third single from the album Rainbow Man. The song reached #23 on the Billboard Hot Country Singles & Tracks chart. The song was written by Bates and Kenny Beard.

== Chart performance ==
Chart (2004)	Peak position
US Hot Country Songs (Billboard)	23
