= That's How I Got to Memphis =

American country music standard written by Tom T. Hall

"That's How I Got to Memphis", sometimes titled "How I Got to Memphis", is a country music standard written by American country music artist Tom T. Hall. The song tells a man's story of coming to Memphis to look for a former lover. The song first appeared on Hall's 1969 album Ballad of Forty Dollars & His Other Great Songs. It has been widely covered, most notably by Bobby Bare in 1970, Deryl Dodd in 1996, Whitey Morgan and the 78's in 2015, and Charley Crockett in 2018.

== Bobby Bare version ==
"How I Got to Memphis"

Single by Bobby Bare

from the album This Is Bare Country
- B-side: "It's Freezing in El Paso"
- Released: August 1970
- Genre: Country
- Length: 2:31
- Label: Mercury
- Songwriter: Tom T. Hall
- Producer: Jerry Kennedy

Bobby Bare singles chronology
"Your Husband, My Wife" (1970)	"How I Got to Memphis" (1970)	"Come Sundown" (1970)

Bobby Bare covered the song under the name "How I Got to Memphis" on his 1970 album This Is Bare Country.

=== Critical reception ===
An uncredited review in Billboard called the song "potent Tom T. Hall material, delivered in one of Bare's finest performances."

=== Chart performance ===
Bobby Bare's version spent 16 weeks on the Hot Country Songs charts, peaking at number 3.

Chart (1970)	Peak position
US Hot Country Songs (Billboard)	3
Canadian RPM Country Tracks	22

== Deryl Dodd version ==
"That's How I Got to Memphis"

Single by Deryl Dodd

from the album One Ride in Vegas
- Released: November 9, 1996
- Genre: Country
- Length: 3:14
- Label: Columbia
- Songwriter: Tom T. Hall
- Producers: Blake Chancey, Chip Young

Deryl Dodd singles chronology
"Friends Don't Drive Friends…" (1996)	"That's How I Got to Memphis" (1996)	"Movin' Out to the Country" (1997)

In late 1996, Deryl Dodd covered the song for his debut album One Ride in Vegas. The song was the album's second single. In place of a b-side, the single release contained album snippets.

=== Critical reception ===
Don Yates of Country Standard Time called Dodd's version of the song "impassioned".

=== Chart performance ===
Dodd's version charted on Hot Country Songs for 20 weeks, peaking at number 36 in early 1997.

Chart (1996–1997)	Peak position
Canada Country Singles (RPM)	38
US Hot Country Songs (Billboard)	36

== Other versions ==
The song has been widely covered by other artists and is now considered a standard.

A French language version entitled "Sur la route de Memphis" was a hit for French rock and country artist Eddy Mitchell and was the title track for his 1977 album.

Rosanne Cash covered the song on her fourth studio album, Somewhere in the Stars, from 1982. Her father Johnny Cash has an uncredited appearance on vocals.

The song was covered by country singer Kelly Willis on Real: The Tom T. Hall Project (Sire Records, 1998).

It is also featured in the series finale of The Newsroom.

The song was covered by Barry Darnell on his Postcards From Tupelo album 1998).
