= This Ain't No Love Song =

Single by Trace Adkins

from the album Cowboy's Back in Town
- Released: May 17, 2010
- Genre: Country
- Length: 3:19
- Label: Show Dog-Universal
- Songwriters: Tony Lane; Marcel Chagnon; David Lee
- Producer: Michael Knox

Trace Adkins singles chronology
"Ala-Freakin-Bama" (2010)	"This Ain't No Love Song" (2010)	"Brown Chicken Brown Cow" (2011)

"This Ain't No Love Song" is a song written by Tony Lane, Marcel Chagnon and David Lee, and recorded by American country music artist Trace Adkins. It was released in May 2010 as the second single from his album Cowboy's Back in Town.

== Critical reception ==
Bobby Peacock of Roughstock gave the song 3.5 out of 5 stars, describing the song as "a neat little inversion and a perfect fit for his voice." He also said that Adkins "seems to overdose on the masculine swagger, he tones it down just enough without sacrificing his slightly defiant, strong nature." Peacock also said that the song should get Adkins back on track as a country artist for good. Kevin John Coyne of Country Universe gave the song a B grade saying that the Adkins sings the song well but he "doesn't sing it well enough to elevate it beyond what it already is".

== Music video ==
The music video was directed by Michael Salomon starring Adkins and Playboy Playmate Jaime Faith Edmondson and premiered on CMT on June 19, 2010.

== Chart performance ==
"This Ain't No Love Song" debuted at number 54 on the U.S. Billboard Hot Country Songs charts for the week of May 22, 2010.

Chart (2010)	Peak position
US Hot Country Songs (Billboard)	15
US Billboard Hot 100	88
