= One Ride in Vegas =

Studio album by Deryl Dodd
- Released: October 8, 1996
- Genre: Country
- Length: 34:17
- Label: Columbia Nashville
- Producer: Blake Chancey, Chip Young

Deryl Dodd chronology
One Ride in Vegas (1996)	Deryl Dodd (1998)

One Ride in Vegas is the debut studio album by American country music singer Deryl Dodd. It was released in 1996 via Columbia Records. The album includes the singles "Friends Don't Drive Friends…", "That's How I Got to Memphis", and "Movin' Out to the Country".

== Critical reception ==
Don Yates of Country Standard Time gave the album a mixed review, saying that "Friends Don't Drive Friends…" was "one of the finest honky tonk songs of the year" and that Dodd was "impassioned" on "That's How I Got to Memphis", but he criticized the rest of the album for "rely[ing] on lyrical clichés".

== Track listing ==
No.	Title	Writer(s)	Length
1.	"Friends Don't Drive Friends…"	Deryl Dodd	3:29
2.	"That's How I Got to Memphis"	Tom T. Hall	3:14
3.	"Movin' Out to the Country"	Dodd	3:55
4.	"Stayin' Is the Only Way to Go"	Dodd, Brett Beavers	3:24
5.	"Somethin' Like That"	Dodd	2:33
6.	"This Ol' World (Keeps Turning on Me)"	Shane Decker, Joe Doyle	3:44
7.	"One Ride in Vegas"	Dodd, Beavers	4:11
8.	"13 MWZ"	Dodd, Beavers	2:54
9.	"I Can Love You"	Dodd	3:23
10.	"That's Just Me"	Dodd	3:30

== Personnel ==
- Deryl Dodd- lead vocals, background vocals
- Glen Duncan- fiddle
- Pat Flynn- acoustic guitar
- Sonny Garrish- steel guitar
- Owen Hale- drums
- David Hungate- bass guitar
- Liana Manis- background vocals
- Larry Marrs- background vocals
- Brent Mason- electric guitar
- Steve Nathan- keyboards
- Harry Stinson- background vocals
- Glenn Worf- bass guitar

== Chart performance ==
Chart (1996)	Peak position
U.S. Billboard Top Country Albums	61
Canadian RPM Country Albums	14
