= I Can't Lie to Me =

2000 single by Clay Davidson

Single by Clay Davidson

from the album Unconditional
- B-side: "Doghouse Rights"
- Released: July 29, 2000
- Genre: Country
- Length: 3:21
- Label: Virgin
- Songwriters: Clay Davidson, Kenny Beard, Casey Beathard
- Producers: Scott Hendricks, Jude Cole

Clay Davidson singles chronology
"Unconditional" (2000)	"I Can't Lie to Me" (2000)	"Sometimes" (2000)

"I Can't Lie to Me" is a song co-written and recorded by American country music artist Clay Davidson. It was released in July 2000 as the second single from the album Unconditional. The song reached #26 on the Billboard Hot Country Singles & Tracks chart. The song was written by Davidson, Kenny Beard and Casey Beathard.

== Chart performance ==
Chart (2000)	Peak position
Canada Country Singles (RPM)	44 (Note: "I Can't Lie to Me" had not yet peaked when RPM ceased publication in November 2000.)
US Hot Country Songs (Billboard)	26
US Bubbling Under Hot 100 (Billboard)	17
