= A Bitter End =

Single by Deryl Dodd

from the album Deryl Dodd
- B-side: "Time on My Hands"
- Released: September 12, 1998
- Genre: Country
- Length: 3:40
- Label: Columbia
- Songwriter(s): Deryl Dodd, Kenny Beard
- Producer(s): Chip Young, Blake Chancey

Deryl Dodd singles chronology
"Time on My Hands" (1998)	"A Bitter End" (1998)	"Sundown" (1999)

"A Bitter End" is a song co-written and recorded by American country music artist Deryl Dodd. It was released in September 1998 as the first single from the album Deryl Dodd. The song reached #26 on the Billboard Hot Country Singles & Tracks chart. The song was written by Dodd and Kenny Beard.

== Critical reception ==
A review of the album in Billboard stated that the song was a "classic 'woe is lonely me' weeper."

== Chart performance ==
Chart (1998–1999)	Peak position
US Billboard Hot 100	88
US Hot Country Songs (Billboard)	26
Canadian RPM Country Tracks	44
