= Brown Chicken Brown Cow =

Single by Trace Adkins

from the album Cowboy's Back in Town
- Released: January 15, 2011
- Genre: Country
- Length: 3:25
- Label: Show Dog-Universal Music
- Songwriter(s): Kenny Beard, Casey Beathard, Rivers Rutherford
- Producer(s): Michael Knox

Trace Adkins singles chronology
"This Ain't No Love Song" (2010)	"Brown Chicken Brown Cow" (2011)	"Just Fishin'" (2011)

"Brown Chicken Brown Cow" is a song recorded by American country music artist Trace Adkins. It was released in January 2011 as the third and final single from the album Cowboy's Back in Town. The song reached #39 on the Billboard Hot Country Songs chart before, amid controversy about the song's premise, the song was pulled from country radio after two months and replaced with the much more family-friendly track "Just Fishin'."

The song was written by Kenny Beard, Casey Beathard and Rivers Rutherford. Adkins later publicly apologized for the song being released, blaming the songwriters for it. The Boot later clarified that Adkins' apology was not for releasing for the song, but rather for asking more "conservative" stations to play it.

== Content ==
The song uses an innuendo on "bow chicka bow wow" (an onomatopoeia for music in pornography) and describes the exploits of Bobby Joe and Betty, married farmers who use the loft in their barn to have sex where no one can watch them except the livestock.

== Chart performance ==
Chart (2011)	Peak position
US Hot Country Songs (Billboard)	39
