= Unconditional (Clay Davidson album) =

Studio album by Clay Davidson
- Released: April 11, 2000
- Recorded: 1999–2000
- Genre: Country; southern rock
- Length: 38:34
- Label: Virgin Nashville
- Producer: Jude Cole; Chris Farren; Scott Hendricks

Singles from Unconditional
- 1. "Unconditional" Released: February 15, 2000; 2. "I Can't Lie to Me" Released: July 29, 2000; 3. "Sometimes" Released: January 27, 2001

Professional ratings
Review scores
Source	Rating
AllMusic	3/5 stars

Unconditional is the only studio album by American country music singer-songwriter Clay Davidson. It was released on April 11, 2000, through Virgin Records Nashville. The album's lead single and title track, "Unconditional", was a Top 5 hit on the Billboard Hot Country Singles & Tracks (now Hot Country Songs) charts in 2000. "I Can't Lie to Me" and "Sometimes" were also released as singles, both charting in the Top 30 on the same chart. Jude Cole and Scott Hendricks produced the album, with additional production from Chris Farren on "What Was I Thinking Of".

== Release and promotion ==
Virgin Nashville began circulating the title track "Unconditional" to radio stations in December 1999, and it quickly became a hit, first charting in January 2000. "Unconditional" was officially released as the album's lead single in February 2000.

== Critical reception ==
William Ruhlmann of AllMusic rated the album three stars, comparing its sound to southern rock on some tracks but saying "there's nothing here that's particularly striking from a creative standpoint." Entertainment Weekly critic Alanna Nash rated it B+, comparing Davidson's vocals to Delbert McClinton and calling the album "a tender-tough charmer."

== Track listing ==
No.	Title	Writer(s)	Length
1.	"Makin' Hay"	Marcus Hummon, Jason Sellers	3:05
2.	"I Can't Lie to Me"	Casey Beathard, Kenny Beard, Clay Davidson	3:21
3.	"Unconditional"	Rivers Rutherford, Deanna Bryant, Liz Hengber	4:01
4.	"Plain Ol' Pain"	Tim Nichols, Jimmy Alan Stewart	3:07
5.	"Sometimes"	Beathard, Beard, C. Davidson	3:18
6.	"My Best Friend and Me"	C. Davidson	2:56
7.	"Doghouse Rights"	C. Davidson, Jude Cole	4:22
8.	"Come Rain or Shine"	C. Davidson, Johnny Park, David Lee	3:22
9.	"One More Day"	C. Davidson	2:59
10.	"What Was I Thinking Of"	Chris Farren, Chuck Jones	3:59
11.	"We're All Here"	C. Davidson, Frances Davidson, Mark Marchetti	4:05

== Chart performance ==
Chart (2000)	Peak position
U.S. Billboard Top Country Albums	33
U.S. Billboard Top Heatseekers	39
