= Off the Hillbilly Hook =

EP by Trailer Choir
- Released: June 9, 2009
- Genre: Country
- Label: Show Dog Nashville
- Producer: Toby Keith; Mills Logan

Trailer Choir chronology
Off the Hillbilly Hook (2009)	Tailgate (2010)

Off the Hillbilly Hook is an extended play released by the American country music group Trailer Choir. It was released on June 9, 2009 via Show Dog Nashville, now part of Show Dog-Universal Music. The album contains the singles "Off the Hillbilly Hook," "What Would You Say," "Rockin' the Beer Gut" and "Rollin' Through the Sunshine." These latter three songs all charted on Hot Country Songs between 2009 and 2010. "Rockin' the Beer Gut" also charted at number 12 on the Bubbling Under Hot 100 chart.

== Track listing ==
1. "Rockin' the Beer Gut" (Butter) – 3:06
2. "Rollin' Through the Sunshine" (Butter, Big Vinny, Isaac Rich) – 3:15
3. "In My Next 5 Beers" (Butter, Big Vinny, Rick, Thom Shepherd) – 2:42
4. "What Would You Say" (Butter, Big Vinny, David Fortney) – 3:40
5. "Last Man Standing" (Butter, Chance, John Kromer, Scott Lynch) – 3:31
6. "Off the Hillbilly Hook" (Butter, Big Vinny, Jewels Hanson) – 3:09

== Critical reception ==
Steve Leggett of AllMusic gave this EP a three-and-a-half star review, saying that it was "catchy and commercial," and Greg Yost of Country Standard Time said "it is clear that not only is this trio funny, but Trailer Choir has the songwriting, vocal and music talent to sustain a career."

== Personnel ==
- Acoustic Guitar - Ilya Toshinsky
- Backing Vocals - Weston Harvey
- Bass - David Santos
- Drums - Greg Morrow
- Electric Guitar - Jerry McPherson
- Electric Guitar - Kenny Greenburg
- Harmonica - Stacie Collins
- Keyboards- Tim Akers
- Percussion - Eric Darken

== Chart performance ==
Chart (2009)	Peak position
U.S. Billboard 200	170
U.S. Billboard Country Albums	30
U.S. Billboard Heatseekers Albums	4
