= Bunker Hill, Mississippi =

Human settlement in Mississippi, United States

- Unincorporated community
- Location within Mississippi Location within the United States
- Coordinates: 31°23′15″N 89°48′12″W
- Country: United States
- State: Mississippi
- County: Marion
- Elevation: 325 ft (99 m)
- Time zone: UTC-6 (Central (CST))
  - Summer (DST): UTC-5 (CDT)
- GNIS feature ID: 691737

Bunker Hill, (also known as Carley), is an unincorporated community in Marion County located 9.3 miles (15.0 km) miles north-northeast of Columbia on Mississippi Highway 35.

== History ==
Bunker Hill was originally known as Carley and once had a masonic lodge, school, and two stores. The community eventually became known as Bunker Hill. There are two theories as to where the name Bunker Hill originated: one theory says it is named for the large hill on which the community is located. Another story tells that after the community was chosen as the site to open a new school in Marion County, the citizens felt they had worked as hard "as the men did to win the Battle of Bunker Hill".

In 1900, Bunker Hill had a population of 32.

A post office operated under the name Carley from 1880 to 1907.

== Notable person ==
- Jeff Bates, country music singer
