= Sometimes (Clay Davidson song) =

Single by Clay Davidson

from the album Unconditional
- B-side: "We're All Here"
- Released: January 27, 2001
- Genre: Country
- Length: 3:18
- Label: Virgin
- Songwriter(s): Clay Davidson, Kenny Beard, Casey Beathard
- Producer(s): Scott Hendricks, Jude Cole

Clay Davidson singles chronology
"I Can't Lie to Me" (2000)	"Sometimes" (2001)

"Sometimes" is a song co-written and recorded by American country music artist Clay Davidson. It was released in January 2001 as the third single from the Unconditional The song reached #21 on the Billboard Hot Country Singles & Tracks chart. The song was written by Davidson, Kenny Beard and Casey Beathard.

== Chart performance ==
Chart (2001)	Peak position
US Bubbling Under Hot 100 Singles (Billboard)	12
US Hot Country Songs (Billboard)	21
