= The Love Song (Jeff Bates song) =

Single by Jeff Bates

from the album Rainbow Man
- Released: December 16, 2002
- Genre: Country
- Length: 4:05
- Label: RCA Nashville
- Songwriters: Jeff Bates; Kenny Beard; Casey Beathard
- Producers: Kenny Beard, Scott Hendricks

Jeff Bates singles chronology
"The Love Song" (2002)	"Rainbow Man" (2003)

"The Love Song" is a song co-written and recorded by American country music artist Jeff Bates. It was released in December 2002 as the lead single from his debut album Rainbow Man, released on RCA Nashville. The song was also Bates' highest-charting single on the Hot Country Singles & Tracks (now Hot Country Songs) chart, reaching a peak of #8. Bates wrote this song with Kenny Beard and Casey Beathard.

== Content ==
The song is a mid-tempo ballad accompanied by piano and a string section, with electric guitar solos preceding the second verse and bridge. In it, the male narrator recalls various instances in his life where love was involved. These include being held by his mother as a young child, playing baseball with his father, meeting his girlfriend next door, marrying her and finally, seeing the birth of their child.

== Critical reception ==
Rick Cohoon of Allmusic gave the song a favorable review, comparing Bates' vocal delivery to that of Conway Twitty. Of the lyrics, he said, that they "[appealed] to that almost universal moment when our heart does flip-flops for another and finally to the magic of bringing a child into the world."

== Chart positions ==
"The Love Song" debuted on the Hot Country Singles & Tracks charts dated for the week ending January 4, 2003. It spent thirty weeks on the charts and reached a peak of number 8.

Chart (2002–2003)	Peak position
US Hot Country Songs (Billboard)	8
US Billboard Hot 100	59

=== Year-end charts ===
Chart (2003)	Position
US Country Songs (Billboard)	29
