= Tailgate (album) =

Studio album by Trailer Choir
- Released: July 6, 2010
- Genre: Country
- Length: 32:04
- Label: Show Dog-Universal Music
- Producer: Butter; Toby Keith; Mills Logan; Mark Wright

Trailer Choir chronology
Off the Hillbilly Hook (2009)	Tailgate (2010)	That's How We Do It (2018)

Tailgate is the debut studio album by American country music group Trailer Choir. It was released on July 6, 2010 via Show Dog-Universal Music. The album includes the single "Shakin' That Tailgate," as well as the songs "Rockin' the Beer Gut" and "Rollin' Through the Sunshine," previously released as singles from the trio's 2009 EP Off the Hillbilly Hook. The tracks "Off the Hillbilly Hook," "In My Next 5 Beers" and "Last Man Standing" were previously included on that EP as well.

"Wal-Mart Flowers" was previously released by Stephen Cochran in 2009.

== Track listing ==
No.	Title	Writer(s)	Length
1.	"Shakin' That Tailgate"	Brady Seals, Butter	2:45
2.	"Rollin' Through the Sunshine (Summer Mix)"	Butter, Big Vinny, Isaac Rich	3:17
3.	"Can't Drink All Day"	Bobby Pinson, Vicky McGehee, Brian Davis	3:19
4.	"Last Man Standing"	Butter, Scott Lynch, Chance, John Kromer	3:33
5.	"Homemade Mexico"	Kyle Jacobs, Lee Brice, Joe Leathers	3:05
6.	"Wal-Mart Flowers"	Butter, Big Vinny, Thom Shepherd	3:31
7.	"In My Next 5 Beers"	Butter, Big Vinny, Rich, Shepherd	2:45
8.	"Girls Love to Go Dancin"	Butter	3:31
9.	"Rockin' the Beer Gut"	Butter	3:08
10.	"Off the Hillbilly Hook"	Butter, Big Vinny, Jewels Hanson	3:10

== Personnel ==
Trailer Choir

- Marc "Butter" Fortney - vocals
- Vencent "Big Vinny" Hickerson - vocals
- Crystal Hoyt - vocals

Additional Musicians

- Tim Akers - keyboards
- Eric Darken - percussion
- Fred Eltringham - drums
- Paul Franklin - pedal steel guitar
- Kenny Greenberg - electric guitar
- Rob Hajacos - fiddle
- Weston Harvey - background vocals
- Mark Hill - bass guitar
- Rob McNelly - electric guitar
- Jerry McPherson - electric guitar
- Greg Morrow - drums
- Michael Rhodes - bass guitar
- Mike Rojas - keyboards
- David Santos - bass guitar
- Adam Shoenfeld - electric guitar
- Brandon Tant - background vocals
- Ilya Toshinsky - acoustic guitar

== Critical reception ==
Thom Jurek of AllMusic rated the album three stars out of five, calling it "one solidly placed party anthem after another" but "strictly for contemporary country audiences." Country Weekly reviewer Jessica Phillips praised Butter and Crystal's vocals, but thought that the album lacked more serious songs to contrast the "unexceptional summer ditties." Her review gave it two-and-a-half stars out of five.

== Chart performance ==
Chart (2010)	Peak position
U.S. Billboard 200	93
U.S. Billboard Country Albums	16
