= Jeff Bates =

American singer-songwriter

- Born: Jeffery Wayne Bates; September 19, 1963 (age 63); Bunker Hill, Mississippi, United States
- Genre: Country
- Occupation: Singer-songwriter
- Instruments: Vocals, guitar
- Years active: 2002–present
- Labels: RCA Nashville, Black River, Broken Bow, Skydancer Entertainment
- Website: jeffbates.net

Jeffery Wayne Bates (born September 19, 1963) is an American country music artist. Signed to RCA Nashville in late 2002, Bates released his debut album Rainbow Man in May 2003. In 2005 he released his second album, Leave the Light On, on RCA. He left RCA in 2006. This album was followed by Jeff Bates in 2008 on the independent Black River Entertainment. Bates' two RCA albums accounted for seven chart singles on the Billboard country charts, of which three reached top 40: "The Love Song" (his highest, at No. 8), "I Wanna Make You Cry" at No. 23, and "Long, Slow Kisses" at No. 17.

== Biography ==
Jeffery Wayne Bates was born on September 19, 1963, in Bunker Hill, Mississippi, a small rural community in Marion County. He was adopted by Ed and Barbara Bates, who worked as sharecroppers, and grew up in a large family with nine other brothers and sisters. Growing up in a remote area with limited access to radio and media, Bates developed an early affinity for country and gospel music, heavily influenced by traditional artists and singing gospel songs with his mother.

== Musical career ==
=== Rainbow Man ===
Before signing to a record contract, Bates co-wrote Tracy Lawrence's 2002 single "What a Memory". Bates signed to RCA Records Nashville in 2003, releasing his debut single, "The Love Song" in December 2002. Peaking at No. 8 on the Billboard country charts, it was the first of three singles from his debut album Rainbow Man, which also produced a No. 47 in its title track and a No. 23 in "I Wanna Make You Cry". Bates co-produced the album with David Malloy, Kenny Beard, and Scott Hendricks.

=== Leave the Light On ===
His fourth single, "Long, Slow Kisses", was a re-recording of a cut from his debut album. This re-recording was the third Top 40 hit of his career, peaking at No. 17 in 2005. It was also the first of four singles from his second album, Leave the Light On. However, none of the other three singles from this album — "Good People", "No Shame" and "One Second Chance" — reached Top 40, (However, "No Shame" did reach top 40 at No. 40 for Mediabase, which is used by Bob Kingsley's "Country Top 40" show), and Bates was dropped from RCA's roster.

=== Jeff Bates ===
He signed to Black River Entertainment in 2008 and released his self-titled third album. The album's first three singles were "Don't Hate Me for Lovin' You", "Riverbank", and "One Thing". In January 2009 he released his first Christmas single "That's What Christmas Is" with Jimmy Fortune of The Statler Brothers fame singing background vocals.

=== One Day Closer ===
Jeff's second and first EP for Black River, "One Day Closer" was released February 15, 2011.

== Personal life ==
After signing a contract with Warner-Chappell Publishing, Bates developed a methamphetamine addiction in late 1999. To feed the drug habit, he sold everything he owned and then resorted to stealing, including a guitar from his friend Kenny Beard. On March 14, 2001, he was arrested for drug possession and grand theft. After rehabilitation and jail time, he was given a second chance and signed to RCA. The song "One Second Chance" was inspired by this part of his life.

In August 2006, a $3,500 guitar that was a gift to Bates from the Takamine guitar company and used in his video "One Second Chance" was stolen from Bates's garage. When Bates called the Nashville police, Det. Rick Mavity was sent to investigate. Mavity was the same officer involved in Bates's arrest in 2001. Mavity located the stolen guitar in a pawn shop and returned it to Bates.

In May 2007, Bates married his girlfriend, Kelly Vaughn, in an outdoor ceremony. A year later, he signed to Black River Music Group and released his self-titled third album.

== Discography ==
=== Studio albums ===
Title	Details	Peak chart positions			
Title	Details	US Country	US	US Heat	US Indie
Rainbow Man	Release date: May 20, 2003; Label: RCA Nashville	14	117	1	—
Leave the Light On	Release date: April 11, 2006; Label: RCA Nashville	12	62	—	—
Jeff Bates	Release date: April 8, 2008; Label: Black River	32	—	—	37
One Day Closer	Release date: February 15, 2011; Label: Black River	—	—	—	—
The Songwriter Series	Release date: 2014; Label: Skydancer Entertainment	—	—	—	—
Me & Conway	Release date: October 10, 2014; Label: Skydancer Entertainment	—	—	—	—
Once Upon A Star	Release date: November 10, 2014; Label: Skydancer Entertainment	—	—	—	—
Troublemaker	Release date: November 10, 2017; Label: Skydancer Entertainment	—	—	—	—
"—" denotes releases that did not chart

=== Singles ===
Year	Single	Peak chart positions		Album
Year	Single	US Country	US	Album
2002	"The Love Song"	8	59	Rainbow Man
2003	"Rainbow Man"	47	—	Rainbow Man
2004	"I Wanna Make You Cry"	23	—	Rainbow Man
2004	"Long, Slow Kisses"	17	105	Leave the Light On
2005	"Good People"	42	—	Leave the Light On
2006	"No Shame"	45	—	Leave the Light On
2006	"One Second Chance"	59	—	Leave the Light On
2008	"Don't Hate Me for Lovin' You"	—	—	Jeff Bates
2008	"Riverbank"	—	—	Jeff Bates
2009	"One Thing"	—	—	Jeff Bates
2011	"One Day Closer"	—	—	One Day Closer
2011	"He Wasn't Like Us"	—	—	Jeff Bates
2014	"Me & Conway"	—	—	Me & Conway
2016	"That Thing We Do"	—	—	Me & Conway
2017	"Judging Judas"	—	—	Troublemaker
2017	"Troublemaker"	—	—	Troublemaker
"—" denotes releases that did not chart

=== Music videos ===
Year	Video	Director
2004	"I Wanna Make You Cry"	Steven L. Weaver
2005	"Good People"	Roman White
2006	"One Second Chance"	Deaton Flanigen
2008	"Don't Hate Me For Lovin' You"	Ryan Smith
2009	"One Thing"	Ryan Smith
2016	"That Thing We Do"	
