= Unconditional (Clay Davidson song) =

Single by Clay Davidson

from the album Unconditional
- Released: February 2000
- Genre: Country
- Length: 4:01
- Label: Virgin
- Songwriters: Rivers Rutherford; Deanna Bryant; Liz Hengber
- Producers: Scott Hendricks, Jude Cole

Clay Davidson singles chronology
"Unconditional" (2000)	"I Can't Lie to Me" (2000)

"Unconditional" is a debut song written by Rivers Rutherford, Liz Hengber and Deanna Bryant, and recorded by American country music singer Clay Davidson. It was released in 2000 as the first single and title track from the album Unconditional. The song reached the Top 5 on the Billboard Hot Country Singles & Tracks chart, peaking at number 3. It was his most successful hit single to date.

== Charts ==
=== Weekly charts ===
Chart (2000)	Peak position
Canada Country Singles (RPM)	9
US Billboard Hot 100	49
US Hot Country Songs (Billboard)	3

=== Year-end charts ===
Chart (2000)	Position
US Country Songs (Billboard)	24
