= Trailer Choir =

American country music group

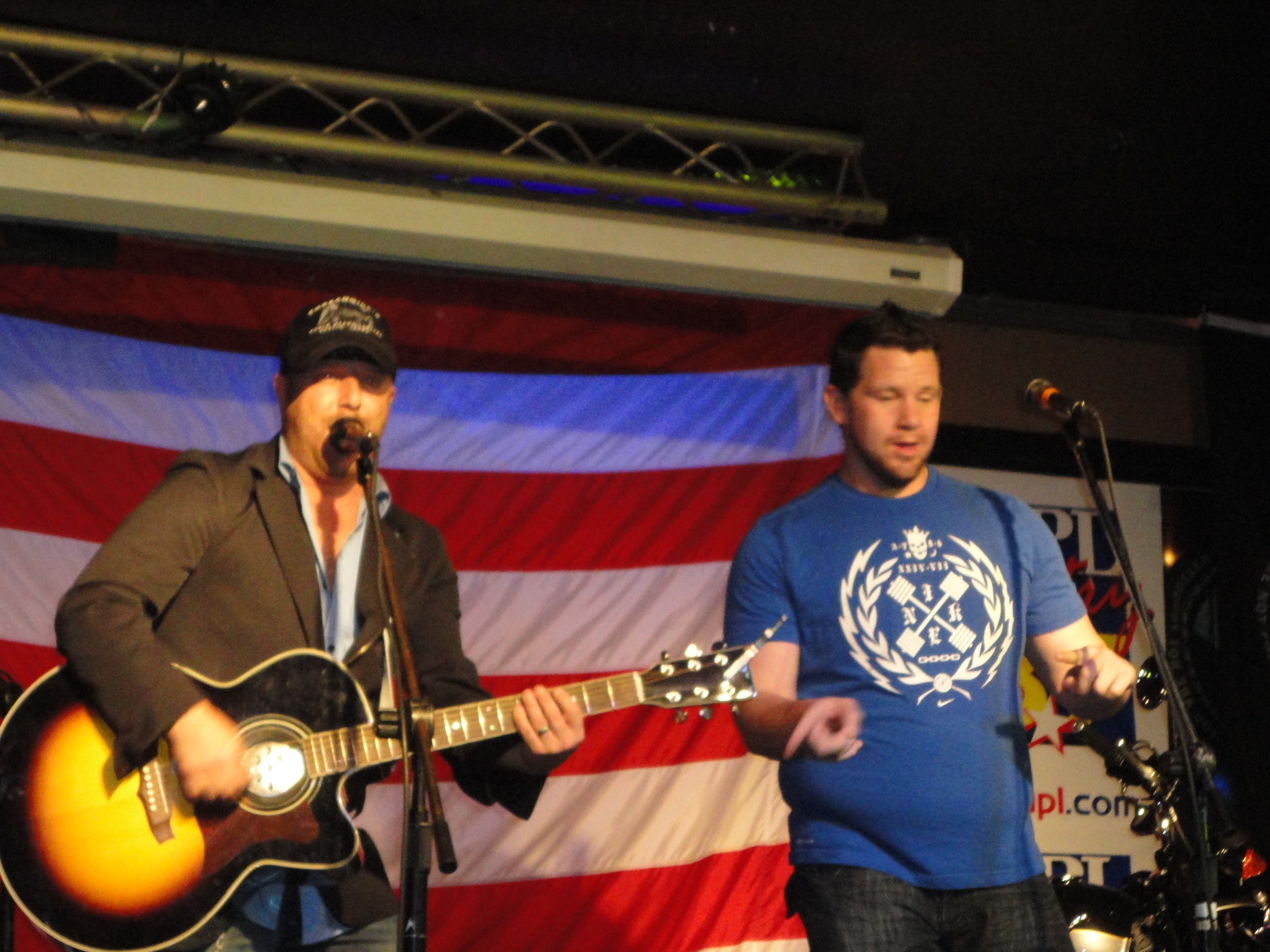
- Fortney (left) and Hickerson (right) in Portland, Oregon on May 25, 2012

Background information
- Origin: Nashville, Tennessee, U.S.
- Genre: Country
- Years active: 2004–2016
- Labels: Show Dog-Universal, Hollaville, Average Joes
- Past members: Crystal Hoyt; Marc "Butter" Fortney; Vincent "Big Vinny" Hickerson

Trailer Choir was an American country music group composed of vocalists Marc "Butter" Fortney, Crystal Hoyt, and Vincent "Big Vinny" Hickerson. The trio was signed to Show Dog Nashville, a label owned by Toby Keith, in 2007. After recording the song "Off the Hillbilly Hook" for the soundtrack to Keith's film Beer for My Horses, Trailer Choir charted the singles "What Would You Say", "Rockin' the Beer Gut" and "Rollin' Through the Sunshine" on the Billboard Hot Country Songs charts. These singles were followed by an extended play called Off the Hillbilly Hook and an album called Tailgate. Hoyt departed the group in February 2011. The remaining members took a small hiatus in 2012, but started touring again in 2013 before ending their career again in 2016.

== Background ==
Trailer Choir was founded in 2004 by Marc Fortney, known as Butter, along with Vinny Hickerson and Crystal Hoyt, who are respectively known as Big Vinny and Crystal in the group. Trailer Choir had originally started as a loose association of musicians, usually including Fortney and Hickerson, that played cover shows at fraternities and clubs in order to make some money and have some fun, rather than as an intended career path. Wanting to add original music without losing the audience led the group to writing and playing the party anthem style they are known for. They then started performing original shows during the week, while continuing to play the frat houses and clubs on the weekend.

At one performance in late 2006, a fan named Crystal Hoyt jumped on the stage and took over Hickerson's microphone, thus becoming a member of the band until she parted ways with them in early 2011. Not long after Hoyt joined them, Toby Keith showed up at one of their original performances on "The Billy Block Show" at a club called 12th & Porter. When Billy Block told them that Toby Keith was there wanting to talk with them, they at first thought he was joking.

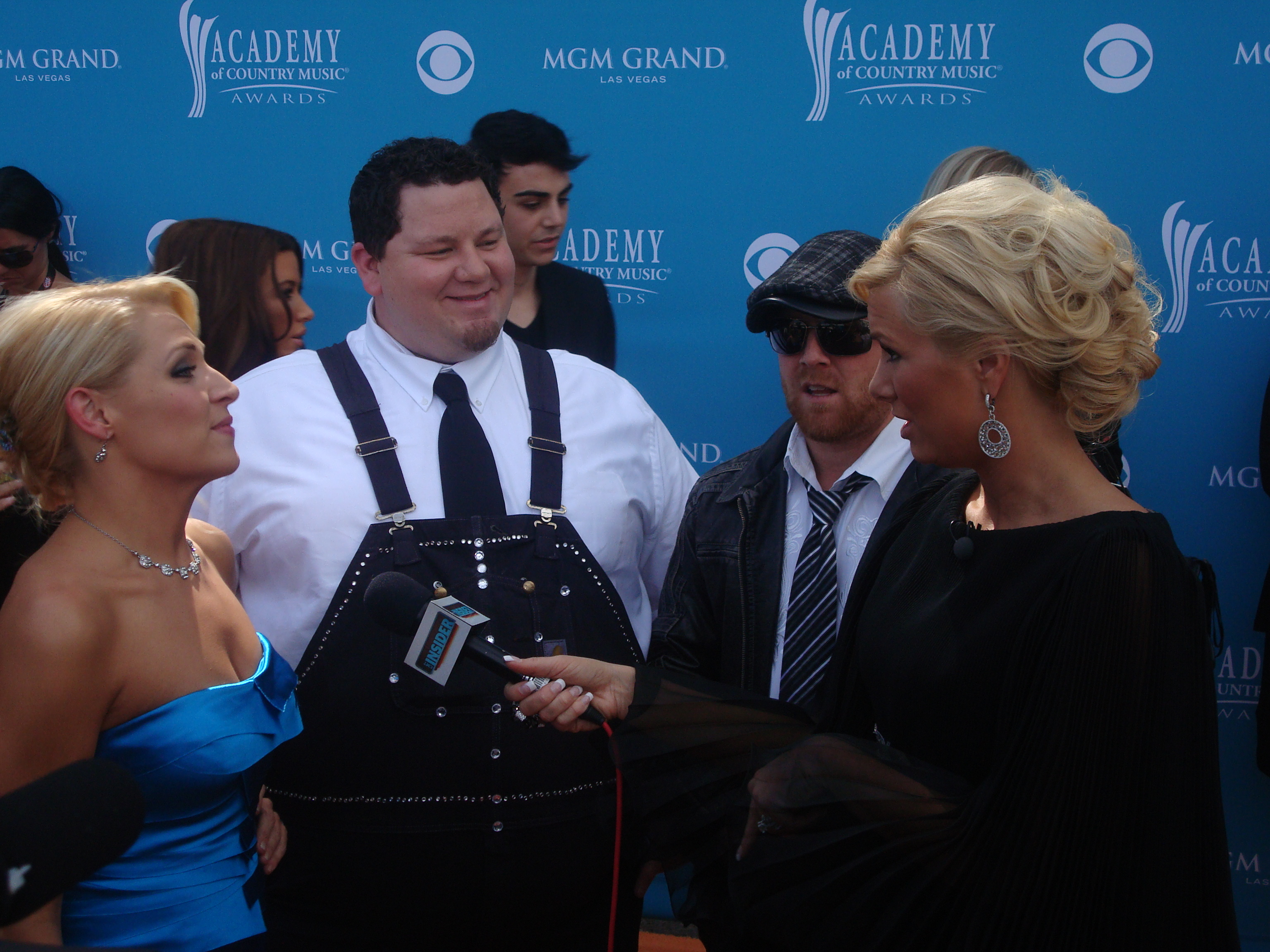
Trailer Choir being interviewed: L-R: Crystal, Big Vinny, Butter and interviewer Allison DeMarcus.

The trio signed to Show Dog Nashville, a label owned by Toby Keith, in June 2007. After Keith had them play for the staff of his record label, they were offered a deal on the spot, and after signing on a Tuesday, they were on a tour bus by Thursday as part of Keith's Big Dog Daddy tour. Keith left it up to them to make it work, so they played anywhere they could find fans, including side stages, beer stands, and parking lots. Hickerson reports averaging 50 pop worms a day.

Trailer Choir's first recording for Show Dog was the track "Off the Hillbilly Hook", which was included in the soundtrack to the 2008 film Beer for My Horses, in which Toby Keith starred. Shortly afterward, "Off the Hillbilly Hook" was released as a single and was made into a music video. Trailer Choir also released a digital EP on November 4.

In 2009, Trailer Choir issued its second single, "What Would You Say." This became the group's first chart entry, peaking at No. 43 on the Billboard Hot Country Songs charts in May 2009. On June 9, 2009, the group released a physical extended play entitled Off the Hillbilly Hook, which included all four songs from the digital EP and two more songs. After its release came the trio's third single, "Rockin' the Beer Gut", which became the group's first Top 40 hit on the country charts in mid-2009. The song's music video features Wolf from American Gladiators. In December 2009, "Rockin' the Beer Gut" re-entered the charts following a "Holla Day Version" released for the Christmas season. "Rollin' Through the Sunshine" charted at No. 50 in early 2010, shortly before the release of the band's debut album, Tailgate. The band also appears on the track "Don't Mind If I Don't" from Trace Adkins's album Cowboy's Back in Town.

Their song "Last Man Standing" has been used in promotions for the 2008 NASCAR "Chase for the Sprint Cup," and a high school football show known as "Rivalry Thursday."

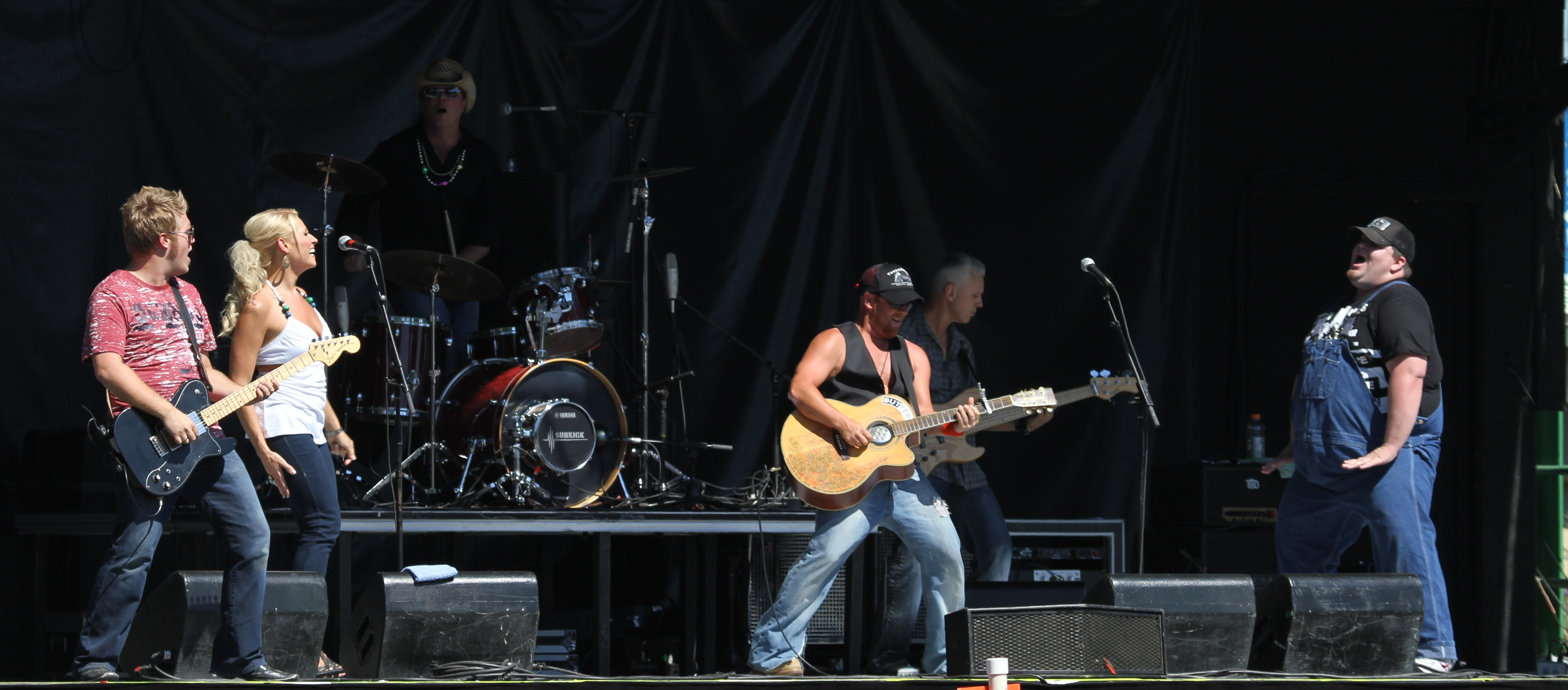
Trailer Choir performing at the New York State Fair

On February 1, 2011, Trailer Choir announced that Crystal Hoyt had left the group to pursue other interests.

In November 2011, Trailer Choir released a new single called "Love Me First" through their own Hollaville Records.

On September 2, 2012, it was announced on Facebook that Vinny Hickerson has a new band. In reply to a follower post that same day inquiring about Trailer Choir he explained that "Butter decided to leave the band due to his new baby." Hickerson would be going by the stage name Vinny Van-Zant.

In July 2015 it was reported that Fortney and Hickerson had signed with Average Joes Entertainment and were working on an album for the new label.

== Personal lives ==
=== Marc 'Butter' Fortney ===
Fortney was raised in Ashtabula, Ohio, where he grew up on rock music. In high school, Fortney was interested in baseball until the audience reaction he got playing John Mellencamp's "Small Town" for the school talent show made an impression on him. Although he had played guitar for a while, he didn't start writing music until he wrote a song for a friend's funeral. He says of it, “That was the first time I ever put words and melody together. I realized in the future that was what I was going to be.”

His interest in country music arose while a student at Middle Tennessee State. As a student there, he then started playing fraternity parties in The Butter Band Sometime after Hickerson joined them, Fortney started calling the group Trailer Choir.

Fortney also worked a variety of other jobs around Nashville during this period. While working as an intern for a record label, he had gotten nicknamed ‘Butter’ by people that related his dancing and goofing around to him being like butter.

Fortney married Emily Robertson of Carter's Chord in a surprise ceremony September 6, 2010 in Nashville, Tennessee. The couple had met while their respective bands were touring together with Toby Keith. On October 16, 2012, Emily gave birth to their first child, a son named Tug Ryder Fortney. Their second son, Hutch Robertson Fortney, was born March 17, 2015.

=== Vencent 'Big Vinny' Hickerson ===
Hickerson was raised Vencent Van-Zant Hickerson in the tiny Middle-Tennessee town of Linden. His late father was once a professional guitarist, and although Hickerson didn't know him well until going to live with him at the age of 13, his father managed to pass his passion for music on to his son. Before that, he had lived with his mother and an abusive step-father. This brought up issues for Hickerson later on, while a contestant on NBC's The Biggest Loser.

The difficulties at home eventually led Hickerson to move out on his own as a teenager, renting a room from a friend while he attended school, worked, and played football. Despite the difficulties he had faced, Hickerson found successes. He was voted most valuable lineman of the year twice at his high school, and by the time he was 19 he was the store manager of the Sonic Drive-In fast-food restaurant he worked at.

Hickerson learned to play guitar from his younger brother in January 2002, and was writing his first songs by March. While working at the restaurant 10 to 12 hours a day, he started commuting the hour-and-a-half each way distance to Nashville every night. In 2006, with the financial help of someone that believed in him, he finally decided to move there. In Nashville, he ended up renting space next door to Fortney, which led to their friendship and musical collaboration.

In 2011, Hickerson entered the television competition The Biggest Loser following a hospitalization in February on Super Bowl Sunday, where he had been diagnosed with type 2 diabetes and cellulitis. While on the show he lost 184 lbs., made the final four, and was the runner-up for the at-home prize. The show also aired Hickerson's marriage proposal to his girlfriend Lori Diaz, which took place at the Grand Ole Opry House with Thompson Square giving a private performance of "Are You Gonna Kiss Me or Not." The couple was married on October 11, 2012 (10-11-12) in Tennessee.

Hickerson and Diaz divorced in May 2015.

He later married a certified personal trainer named Jenny who is also a group fitness instructor, a third degree black belt, a 2012 World Champion in Taekwondo, and a bikini bodybuilder competitor.

On September 12, 2017, his wife Jenny gave birth to a son, Jagger James Van-Zant Hickerson.

Since being on The Biggest Loser Hickerson has been traveling around the country as a motivational speaker. He has been speaking mostly at churches because he says "I want to talk to the people who come from where I come from, the people who are down there fighting the battle every single day of life, that are trying to focus on the things they want."

=== Crystal Hoyt ===
On August 31, 2014, Crystal Hoyt married Todd Bray. On March 31, 2015, she gave birth to a son, Ryman Marshall Bray.

== Discography ==
=== Studio albums ===
Title	Album details	Peak chart positions	
Title	Album details	US Country	US
Tailgate	Release date: July 6, 2010; Label: Show Dog-Universal Music; Formats: CD, music download	16	93
That's How We Do It	Release date: March 16, 2018; Label: Average Joes Entertainment; Formats: CD, music download	—	—

=== Extended plays ===
Title	Album details	Peak chart positions		
Title	Album details	US Country	US	US Heat
Off the Hillbilly Hook	Release date: June 9, 2009; Label: Show Dog Nashville; Formats: CD, music download	30	170	4

=== Singles ===
Year	Single	Peak chart positions		Album
Year	Single	US Country	US Bubbling	Album
2008	"Off the Hillbilly Hook"	—	—	Off the Hillbilly Hook
2009	"What Would You Say"	43	—	Off the Hillbilly Hook
2009	"Rockin' the Beer Gut"	30	10	Off the Hillbilly Hook
2010	"Rollin' Through the Sunshine"	50	—	Tailgate
2010	"Shakin' That Tailgate"	50	—	Tailgate
2011	"Love Me First"	—	—	That's How We Do It
2016	"Ice Cold Summer"	—	—	That's How We Do It
2018	"Take It To The House"	—	—	That's How We Do It
"—" denotes releases that did not chart

=== Other charted songs ===
Year	Single	Peak positions	Album
Year	Single	US Country	Album
2009	"Rockin' the Beer Gut (Holla Day Version)"	51	—N/a

=== Music videos ===
Year	Title	Director
2008	"Off the Hillbilly Hook"	Michael Salomon
2009	"Rockin' the Beer Gut"	The Brads
2009	"Rockin' the Beer Gut (Holla Day Version)"	Trailer Choir
2010	"Rollin' Through the Sunshine"	Michael Salomon
2016	"Ice Cold Summer"	
