= Deryl Dodd =

American country music artist

- Deryl Dodd in 2017

Background information
- Born: Deryl Dwaine Dodd; April 12, 1964 (age 61)
- Origin: Dallas, Texas, U.S.
- Genres: Country
- Occupation: Singer-songwriter
- Instruments: Vocals acoustic guitar
- Years active: 1996–present
- Labels: Columbia; Smith Music Group; Dualtone

Deryl Dwaine Dodd (born April 12, 1964) is an American Texas country music artist. Originally a regular on the Texas club circuit, he moved to Nashville, Tennessee, soon finding work as a lead guitar player, background vocalist and songwriter. After moving to Nashville in 1991 he played lead guitar for Tracy Lawrence and Martina McBride. By 1996, he was signed to a recording contract, releasing two albums for Columbia Records Nashville before a debilitating bout of viral encephalitis put his career on hiatus.

Having recovered from his encephalitis in 2000, Dodd resumed his singing career, also touring with Tim McGraw and Faith Hill. He released a third album for Columbia in 2002, followed by two more albums for Dualtone Records. Overall, Dodd has released five studio albums and a live album, and has charted nine singles on the Billboard Hot Country Songs charts. His highest-charting single, "A Bitter End", peaked at No. 26 on the country charts and No. 88 on the Billboard Hot 100 in late 1998-early 1999.

== Biography ==
Deryl Dodd was raised in Dallas, Texas, where he played football from an early age. After a career-ending injury, Dodd was persuaded to perform music in clubs throughout the state of Texas. In 1991, he moved to Nashville, Tennessee, forming a band along with Brett Beavers, now an established Nashville songwriter. Dodd later found work singing harmony vocals for Martina McBride, Radney Foster, and George Ducas, in addition to playing in Tracy Lawrence's road band, and co-writing a song on Tim McGraw's All I Want album.

Dodd signed to Columbia Records in 1996 as a solo act. His first album, One Ride in Vegas, was released that year, producing a Top 40 hit on the U.S. Billboard country music charts in the Tom T. Hall-penned "That's How I Got to Memphis". One Ride in Vegas was followed by an eponymous album in 1998. In 1999, Dodd was nominated for Top New Male Vocalist of the Year by the Academy of Country Music Awards. His second album, after being delayed due to its initial lead single underperforming at radio, also produced his biggest chart hit to date in "A Bitter End", which peaked at No. 26 on the country charts.

In 1999, Dodd was diagnosed with viral encephalitis, forcing him to temporarily halt his career. He remained bedridden for six months, and then went through eighteen months of rehabilitation (which included re-learning how to play guitar). Once he had fully recovered, he attended several writers' nights in Nashville, and was later signed as an opening act on Tim McGraw and Faith Hill's Soul2Soul tour.

Dodd's third and final album for Columbia, Pearl Snaps, was released in 2002. Later, he performed Live at Billy Bob's Texas where he recorded his anthem hit "New Tony Lamas" written by artist Craig Clemons, before switching to Dualtone Records in 2004 to release Stronger Proof (2004) and Full Circle (2006). In 2009, Dodd released a cover of "Together Again", originally a hit for Buck Owens.

== Discography ==
=== Albums ===
| Title | Album details | Peak chart positions | |
| Title | Album details | US Country | CAN Country |
|---|---|---|---|
| One Ride in Vegas | Release date: October 8, 1996; Label: Columbia Records | 61 | 14 |
| Deryl Dodd | Release date: November 24, 1998; Label: Columbia Records | 63 | — |
| Pearl Snaps | Release date: January 29, 2002; Label: Lucky Dog Records | — | — |
| Live at Billy Bob's Texas | Release date: August 5, 2003; Label: Smith Music Group | 61 | — |
| Stronger Proof | Release date: October 5, 2004; Label: Dualtone Records | — | — |
| Full Circle | Release date: August 8, 2006; Label: Dualtone Records | — | — |
| Together Again | Release date: August 25, 2009; Label: Smith Entertainment | — | — |
| Random as I Am | Release date: July 5, 2011; Label: Smith Entertainment | — | — |
| Long Hard Ride | Release date: April 21, 2017; Label: Little Red Truck | — | — |
"—" denotes releases that did not chart

=== Singles ===
| Year | Single | Peak chart positions | | | Album |
| Year | Single | US Country | US | CAN Country | Album |
|---|---|---|---|---|---|
| 1996 | "Friends Don't Drive Friends…" | 68 | — | 87 | One Ride in Vegas |
| 1996 | "That's How I Got to Memphis" | 36 | — | 38 | One Ride in Vegas |
| 1997 | "Movin' Out to the Country" | 61 | — | 91 | One Ride in Vegas |
| 1998 | "Time on My Hands" | 62 | — | — | —N/a |
| 1998 | "A Bitter End" | 26 | 88 | 44 | Deryl Dodd |
| 1999 | "Good Idea Tomorrow" | 65 | — | 89 | Deryl Dodd |
| 1999 | "John Roland Wood" | 64 | — | 75 | Deryl Dodd |
| 1999 | "Sundown" | 59 | — | 78 | Pearl Snaps |
| 1999 | "On Earth as It Is in Texas" | 71 | — | — | Pearl Snaps |
| 2002 | "Honky Tonk Champagne" | — | — | — | Pearl Snaps |
| 2003 | "Things Are Fixin' to Get Real Good" | — | — | — | Live at Billy Bob's Texas |
| 2004 | "New Tony Lamas" | — | — | — | Live at Billy Bob's Texas |
| 2004 | "Let Me Be" | 59 | — | — | Stronger Proof |
| 2005 | "Love or Something Like It" | — | — | — | Stronger Proof |
| 2006 | "I'm Not Home Right Now" | — | — | — | Full Circle |
| 2007 | "Wearin' a Hole" | — | — | — | Full Circle |
| 2009 | "Together Again" | — | — | — | Together Again |
| 2010 | "Back to the Honky Tonks" | — | — | — | Together Again |
| 2010 | "Death, Taxes and Texas" | — | — | — | Together Again |
| 2011 | "You're Not Looking For" | — | — | — | Together Again |
| 2011 | "Baby Where's My Bottle" | — | — | — | Random as I Am |
| 2012 | "Anybody Out There" | — | — | — | Random as I Am |
| 2012 | "Love Around Here" | — | — | — | Random as I Am |
| 2013 | "Somethin' Ain't Always Better Than Nothin'" | — | — | — | Random as I Am |
| 2013 | "Loveletters" | — | — | — | Random as I Am |
"—" denotes releases that did not chart

=== Music videos ===
| Year | Video | Director |
|---|---|---|
| 1996 | "Friends Don't Drive Friends…" | Steven T. Miller/R. Brad Murano |
| 1996 | "That's How I Got to Memphis" | Marc Ball |
| 1998 | "Time on My Hands" | chris rogers [sic] |
| 1998 | "A Bitter End" | Joseph Sassone |
| 2002 | "Pearl Snaps" | Darren Cameron |

== Awards and nominations ==
| Year | Organization | Award | Nominee/Work | Result |
|---|---|---|---|---|
| 1999 | Academy of Country Music Awards | Top New Male Vocalist | Deryl Dodd | Nominated |
