= Clay Davidson =

American singer-songwriter (born 1971)

- Born: April 4, 1971 (age 55); Saltville, Virginia, U.S.
- Origin: Nashville, Tennessee, U.S.
- Genres: Country
- Occupation: Singer-songwriter
- Instruments: Vocals; guitar
- Years active: 1999–2001; 2016–2018
- Labels: Virgin Nashville; Capitol Nashville

Clay Davidson (born April 4, 1971) is an American country music singer and songwriter. He signed to Virgin Records Nashville division in late 1999. Davidson released his debut album Unconditional in 2000. Its title track was a top 5 hit for him on the Billboard country charts, and the album produced two more Top 30 hits. Davidson was later transferred to Capitol Records Nashville after Virgin Nashville's lineup was merged into Capitol, although he did not record anything for Capitol and was soon dropped. To date, Unconditional remains his only studio album.

== Biography ==
Clay Davidson was born in Saltville, Virginia to a musical family. He moved to Nashville, Tennessee in search of a record deal. While in Nashville, Davidson won Charlie Daniels' Talent Round-Up show in 1995. Davidson and his wife later moved to Tennessee, and Davidson soon became a demo singer for other artists.

Davidson was later called in to substitute for Michael McDonald at a party for rock artist Jude Cole. While at the party, Cole recommended Davidson to Scott Hendricks, who had just started the Virgin Records Nashville label and subsequently signed Davidson to a recording contract. Davidson's first album, Unconditional, was released in April 2000, producing three hit singles on the country music charts.

In early 2001, Virgin Records announced that it would be closing its Virgin Nashville branch. Virgin's artist roster was transferred to Capitol Records Nashville. Davidson, however, did not record any albums or singles during his tenure on Capitol and was soon dropped from the label. On July 20, 2001, Davidson and his touring band were involved in a bus accident outside Effingham, Illinois. He and his bandmates suffered only minor cuts and bruises, but several concerts had to be canceled.

== Discography ==
=== Albums ===
Title	Album details	Peak chart positions	
Title	Album details	US Country	US Heat
Unconditional	Release date: April 11, 2000; Label: Virgin Records	33	39

=== Singles ===
Year	Single	Peak chart positions			Album
Year	Single	US Country	US	US Bubbling	Album
2000	"Unconditional"^{[A]}	3	49	—	Unconditional
2000	"I Can't Lie to Me"	26	—	17	Unconditional
2001	"Sometimes"	21	—	12	Unconditional

Notes

- A "Unconditional" also peaked at number 9 on the RPM Country Tracks chart in Canada.

=== Music videos ===
Year	Video	Director
2000	"Unconditional"	Eric Welch
2000	"I Can't Lie to Me"	Eric Welch
2000	"Sometimes"	Stephen Shepherd
