= Kenny Beard =

American songwriter

- Born: February 26, 1959
- Origin: Nashville, Tennessee, US
- Died: October 1, 2017 (aged 58) Lebanon, Tennessee, US
- Genres: Country
- Occupation: Songwriter

Kenny Beard (February 26, 1959 - October 1, 2017) was an American country music songwriter. He wrote songs for Trace Adkins, Tracy Lawrence, and Aaron Tippin.

== Biography ==
Beard moved to Nashville, Tennessee, in 1986, where he began working as a songwriter. His first hit as a songwriter was "Doghouse" by John Conlee. Artists who recorded his songs included Tracy Lawrence, Aaron Tippin, Trace Adkins, and Jeff Bates. Beard also worked as a music manager and record producer.

Beard died on October 1, 2017.

== List of songs written by Kenny Beard ==
Year	Song	Artist
1990	"Doghouse"	John Conlee
1992	"Today's Lonely Fool"	Tracy Lawrence
1993	"My Second Home"	Tracy Lawrence
1995	"As Any Fool Can See"	Tracy Lawrence
1995	"If the World Had a Front Porch"	Tracy Lawrence
1997	"Is That a Tear"	Tracy Lawrence
1997	"The Rest of Mine"	Trace Adkins
1998	"Big Time"	Trace Adkins
1999	"A Bitter End"	Deryl Dodd
2000	"I Can't Lie to Me"	Clay Davidson
2001	"Sometimes"	Clay Davidson
2001	"Where the Stars and Stripes and the Eagle Fly"	Aaron Tippin
2002	"What a Memory"	Tracy Lawrence
2003	"Country Thang"	John Michael Montgomery
2003	"The Love Song"	Jeff Bates
2004	"I Wanna Make You Cry"	Jeff Bates
2006	"No Shame"	Jeff Bates
2008	"All Wrapped Up in Christmas"	Tracy Lawrence
2011	"Brown Chicken Brown Cow"	Trace Adkins
