= The Judds discography =

Band discography

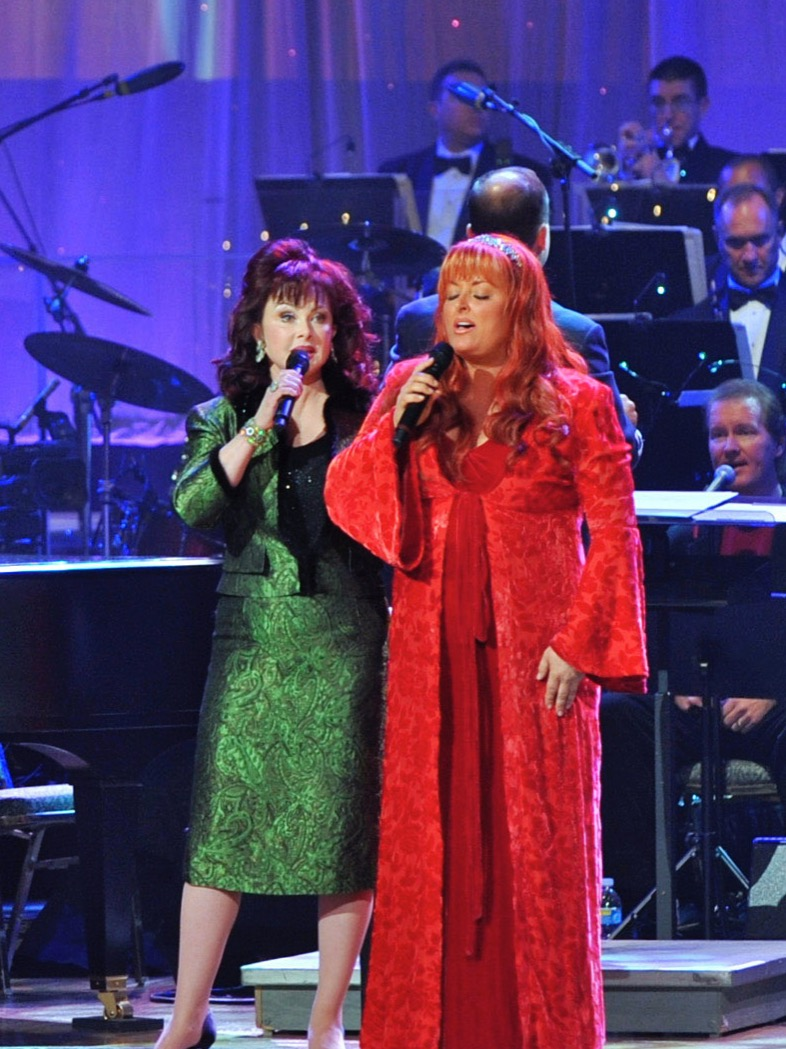
- The Judds performing with the Band of the Air Force Reserve, 2008.
- Studio albums: 6
- Extended plays: 2
- Live albums: 2
- Compilation albums: 18
- Singles: 29
- Video albums: 5
- Music videos: 5
- Box sets: 1
- Other appearances: 1

American country music duo The Judds released six studio albums, three live albums, 18 compilation albums, five video albums, two extended plays, one box set, five music videos, 29 singles and 1 album appearance. The duo consisted of mother, Naomi Judd, and her daughter, Wynonna Judd. The pair signed a recording contract with RCA Records and Curb Records in 1983. Later that year, their debut single was released called "Had a Dream (For the Heart)". Their next release, "Mama He's Crazy", became their first number one hit on the Billboard Hot Country Singles & Tracks chart. The song's success led to the release of their debut EP in 1984. It peaked at number eight on the Billboard Top Country Albums chart. In October 1984, their debut studio album was released entitled Why Not Me. It peaked at number one on the country albums chart and number 71 on the Billboard 200. Why Not Me would sell over two million copies. It also spawned three number one country hits: the title track, "Girls' Night Out" and "Love Is Alive".

The duo's second studio album was issued in October 1985, Rockin' with the Rhythm. It topped the Billboard country albums chart and spawned four number one hits. These hits included "Have Mercy" and "Grandpa (Tell Me 'Bout the Good Old Days)". The Judds's third studio release, Heartland, was released in 1987 and was their third number one Billboard country album. Heartland was also their third album to certify platinum in sales in the United States. The album produced four singles, three of which were number one country hits. In 1988, the duo released their first greatest hits package. It also included two new tracks that became hits. Their fifth studio release, River of Time (1989), reached number two on the country albums chart and was their highest-charting release on the Billboard 200, reaching number 51. The album's first two singles reached number one on the country chart.

In 1990, Naomi announced her retirement after being diagnosed with Hepatitis C. Their final studio album, Love Can Build a Bridge, was released the same year and produced four singles. This included the top ten hits "Born to Be Blue", "One Hundred and Two" and the title track. The album itself reached number five on the Billboard country albums chart by March 1991 and certified platinum in the United States. With the release of a second greatest hits package, the group disbanded in 1991. Wynonna created a successful solo career and Naomi's health improved enough for the duo to reunite in 2000 with a live album. Its success led to the release of the extended play, Big Bang Boogie, in 2000, and resulted in the single "Stuck in Love" becoming their first charting hit in nine years. "Flies on the Butter (You Can't Go Home Again", was released as the third single from Wynonna's 2003 solo album What the World Needs Now Is Love and features Naomi on harmony vocals. Though officially credited as "Wynonna with Naomi Judd", the song has since been featured on several of The Judds' compilation albums and is the duo's final charting single. Announcing their final tour in 2011, the duo released the compilation, I Will Stand by You: The Essential Collection, which included two new tracks.

== Albums ==
=== Studio albums ===
List of albums, with selected chart positions and certifications, showing other relevant details
| Title | Album details | Peak chart positions | | | | | Certifications |
| Title | Album details | US | US Cou. | CAN | CAN Cou. | NLD | Certifications |
|---|---|---|---|---|---|---|---|
| Why Not Me | Released: October 15, 1984; Label: Curb/RCA; Formats: LP, cassette, CD | 71 | 1 | 78 | — | 12 | MC: Platinum; RIAA: 2× Platinum |
| Rockin' with the Rhythm | Released: October 30, 1985; Label: Curb/RCA; Formats: LP, cassette, CD | 66 | 1 | — | — | — | MC: Gold; RIAA: Platinum |
| Heartland (Note: Heartland was released in Europe under the title Give a Little Love.) | Released: February 2, 1987; Label: Curb/RCA; Formats: LP, cassette, CD | 52 | 1 | 40 | — | — | MC: Gold; RIAA: Platinum |
| Christmas Time with the Judds (Note: Christmas Time with the Judds also reached peak positions on the Billboard Top Holiday Albums chart. In 1987, it peaked at number nine on the chart. It re-entered the same chart in 2000 and peaked at number 36.) | Released: September 29, 1987; Label: Curb/RCA; Formats: LP, cassette, CD | — | 49 | — | — | — | MC: Platinum; RIAA: Platinum |
| River of Time | Released: April 4, 1989; Label: Curb/RCA; Formats: LP, cassette, CD | 51 | 2 | — | 1 | 53 | RIAA: Gold |
| Love Can Build a Bridge | Released: September 11, 1990; Label: Curb/RCA; Formats: Cassette, CD | 62 | 5 | — | — | — | MC: Gold; RIAA: Platinum |
"—" denotes a recording that did not chart or was not released in that territory.

=== Compilation albums ===
List of albums, with selected chart positions and certifications, showing other relevant details
| Title | Album details | Peak chart positions | | | | | Certifications |
| Title | Album details | US | US Cou. | CAN | CAN Cou. | NLD | Certifications |
|---|---|---|---|---|---|---|---|
| Greatest Hits | Released: August 2, 1988; Label: Curb/RCA; Formats: LP, cassette, CD | 76 | 1 | 53 | — | — | MC: Platinum; RIAA: 2× Platinum |
| Collector's Series | Released: August 21, 1990; Label: RCA; Formats: Cassette, CD | — | — | — | — | — | RIAA: Gold |
| Their Finest Collection | Released: 1991; Label: Curb/Dino; Formats: LP, cassette, CD | — | — | — | — | 61 | |
| Greatest Hits Volume Two | Released: September 10, 1991; Label: Curb/RCA; Formats: | 54 | 7 | — | 2 | — | RIAA: Gold |
| From the Heart: 15 Career Classics | Released: 1992; Label: Curb/RCA; Formats: Cassette, CD | — | — | 42 | 2 | — | MC: Gold |
| Talk About Love | Released: February 23, 1993; Label: Curb/RCA; Formats: Cassette, CD | — | — | — | — | — | |
| This Country's Rockin' | Released: April 27, 1993; Label: Curb/RCA; Formats: Cassette, CD | — | — | — | — | — | |
| Christmas with The Judds and Alabama (with Alabama) | Released: August 16, 1994; Label: RCA; Formats: Cassette, CD | — | 61 | — | — | — | |
| Reflections | Released: August 16, 1994; Label: Curb/RCA; Formats: Cassette, CD | — | 66 | — | — | — | |
| Live Studio Sessions | Released: August 16, 1994; Label: Curb/RCA; Formats: Cassette, CD | — | — | — | — | — | |
| Number One Hits | Released: October 25, 1994; Label: Curb/RCA; Formats: Cassette, CD | 187 | 39 | — | — | — | RIAA: Platinum |
| The Essential Judds | Released: August 29, 1995; Label: Curb/RCA; Formats: Cassette, CD | — | — | — | — | — | |
| Spiritual Reflections | Released: April 2, 1996; Label: Curb; Formats: Cassette, CD | — | — | — | — | — | |
| Greatest Hits: Limited Edition | Released: August 26, 2008; Label: Curb; Formats: CD | — | — | — | — | — | |
| I Will Stand by You: The Essential Collection | Released: April 5, 2011; Label: Curb; Formats: CD, music download | — | 34 | — | — | — | |
| All-Time Greatest Hits | Released: June 30, 2017; Label: Curb; Formats: CD, music download | 90 | 11 | — | — | — | |
| The Biggest Hits of The Judds | Released: 2018; Label: Curb; Formats: CD, music download | — | — | — | — | — | |
| Love Can Build a Bridge: Best of The Judds | Released: April 8, 2022; Label: Curb; Formats: Music download, streaming | — | — | — | — | — | |
"—" denotes a recording that did not chart or was not released in that territory.

=== Live albums ===
List of albums, with selected chart positions, showing other relevant details
| Title | Album details | Peak chart positions | | |
| Title | Album details | US | US Cou. | CAN Cou. |
|---|---|---|---|---|
| The Judds in Concert | Released: August 29, 1995; Label: Curb/RCA; Formats: CD, cassette | — | — | — |
| The Judds Reunion Live | Released: May 9, 2000; Label: Curb/Mercury; Formats: CD, cassette | 107 | 16 | 16 |
"—" denotes a recording that did not chart or was not released in that territory.

=== Box sets ===
List of albums, showing relevant details
| Title | Album details |
|---|---|
| The Judds Collection, 1983—1990 | Released: September 15, 1992; Label: RCA; Formats: CD, cassette |

== Extended plays ==
List of albums, with selected chart positions and certifications, showing other relevant details
| Title | Album details | Peak chart positions | | Certifications |
| Title | Album details | US | US Cou. | Certifications |
|---|---|---|---|---|
| Wynonna & Naomi | Released: February 1984; Label: Curb/RCA; Formats: LP, CD, cassette | 153 | 8 | RIAA: Gold |
| Big Bang Boogie | Released: February 1, 2000; Label: Curb/Mercury; Formats: CD | — | — | |
"—" denotes a recording that did not chart or was not released in that territory.

== Singles ==
List of singles, with selected chart positions, showing other relevant details
| Title | Year | Peak chart positions | | Certifications | Album |
| Title | Year | US Coun. | CAN Coun. | Certifications | Album |
|---|---|---|---|---|---|
| "Had a Dream (For the Heart)" | 1983 | 17 | 15 | | Wynonna & Naomi |
| "Mama He's Crazy" | 1984 | 1 | 1 | RIAA: Gold | Wynonna & Naomi |
| "Why Not Me" | 1984 | 1 | 3 | RIAA: Gold | Why Not Me |
| "Light of the Stable" | 1984 | — | — | | A Country Christmas, Volume 3 |
| "Girls Night Out" | 1985 | 1 | 1 | | Why Not Me |
| "Love Is Alive" | 1985 | 1 | 1 | | Why Not Me |
| "Have Mercy" | 1985 | 1 | 2 | | Rockin' with the Rhythm |
| "Who Is This Babe" | 1985 | — | — | | A Country Christmas, Volume 4 |
| "Grandpa (Tell Me 'Bout the Good Old Days)" | 1986 | 1 | 1 | RIAA: Platinum | Rockin' with the Rhythm |
| "Rockin' with the Rhythm of the Rain" | 1986 | 1 | 1 | | Rockin' with the Rhythm |
| "Cry Myself to Sleep" | 1986 | 1 | 2 | | Rockin' with the Rhythm |
| "Don't Be Cruel" | 1987 | 10 | 4 | | Heartland |
| "I Know Where I'm Going" | 1987 | 1 | 1 | | Heartland |
| "Maybe Your Baby's Got the Blues" | 1987 | 1 | 1 | | Heartland |
| "Silver Bells" | 1987 | 68 (Note: "Silver Bells" was released as a single in 1987, but did not chart until 1998.) | — | | Christmas Time with the Judds |
| "Turn It Loose" | 1988 | 1 | 5 | | Heartland |
| "Give a Little Love" | 1988 | 2 | 1 | | Greatest Hits |
| "Change of Heart" (Note: "Change of Heart" was originally included on their debut extended play, Wynonna & Naomi (1984).) | 1988 | 1 | 1 | | Greatest Hits |
| "Young Love (Strong Love)" | 1989 | 1 | 1 | | River of Time |
| "Water of Love" (Note: "Water of Love" was only released in Germany.) | 1989 | — | — | | River of Time |
| "Let Me Tell You About Love" | 1989 | 1 | 1 | | River of Time |
| "One Man Woman" | 1989 | 8 | 14 | | River of Time |
| "Guardian Angels" | 1990 | 16 | 16 | | River of Time |
| "Born to Be Blue" | 1990 | 5 | 4 | | Love Can Build a Bridge |
| "Love Can Build a Bridge" | 1990 | 5 | 6 | | Love Can Build a Bridge |
| "One Hundred and Two" | 1991 | 6 | 5 | | Love Can Build a Bridge |
| "John Deere Tractor" | 1991 | 29 | 60 | | Greatest Hits Volume Two |
| "Stuck in Love" | 2000 | 26 | 16 | | Big Bang Boogie |
| "I Will Stand by You" | 2010 | — | — | | I Will Stand by You: The Essential Collection |
"—" denotes a recording that did not chart or was not released in that territory.

== Videography ==
=== Video albums ===
List of albums, showing certifications and other relevant details
| Title | Album details | Certifications |
|---|---|---|
| Across the Heartland | Released: September 27, 1989; Label: MPI; Formats: VHS | RIAA: Gold |
| Great Video Hits of The Judds | Released: April 18, 1990; Label: Curb/RCA; Formats: VHS | RIAA: Gold |
| Love Can Build a Bridge | Released: November 28, 1990; Label: MPI; Formats: VHS | RIAA: Platinum |
| Their Final Concert | Released: April 29, 1992; Label: MPI; Formats: VHS | RIAA: Platinum |
| Naomi & Wynonna: The Farewell Tour | Released: October 6, 1993; Label: MPI; Formats: VHS | RIAA: Gold |

=== Music videos ===
List of music videos, showing year released and director
| Title | Year | Director(s) | Ref. |
|---|---|---|---|
| "Mama He's Crazy" | 1984 | David Hogan | |
| "Love Is Alive" | 1985 | David Hogan | |
| "Grandpa (Tell Me 'Bout the Good Old Days)" | 1986 | David Hogan | |
| "Give a Little Love" | 1988 | Bud Schaetzle | |
| "Love Can Build a Bridge" | 1991 | Bud Schaetzle | |

== Other album appearances ==
List of non-single guest appearances, with other performing artists, showing year released and album name
| Title | Year | Other artist(s) | Album | Ref. |
|---|---|---|---|---|
| "Big Train (From Memphis)" | 1986 | Johnny Cash; Jerry Lee Lewis; Roy Orbison; Carl Perkins | Class of '55: Memphis Rock & Roll Homecoming | |

== See also ==
- Wynonna Judd discography
- "Flies on the Butter (You Can't Go Home Again)", a song recorded by both Wynonna and Naomi Judd but credited as a duet
