= List of songs recorded by the Judds =

American country music duo the Judds recorded a total of 90 songs from 1978 to 2011. 80 of these songs were recorded as the Judds (77 studio recordings, two live recordings that were never recorded in the studio, and one studio work tape that was never completed for a studio album). "John Deere Tractor" was recorded twice. The first time was for Wynonna & Naomi (1984) and the second was for Love Can Build a Bridge (1990). The other ten songs consist of four demo recordings from 1978 which were recorded under the name Naomi & Christina, five songs from Wynonna's solo albums which feature vocals from Naomi, and one recording featuring guest backing vocals from the Judds.

== Songs ==
Title	Artist(s)	Writer(s)	Album	Year	Ref
"Are the Roses Not Blooming"	The Judds	Thom Schuyler	Love Can Build a Bridge	1990	
"Auld Lang Syne" (Live)	The Judds	Robert Burns	The Judds Reunion Live	2000	
"Away in a Manger"	The Judds	Traditional	Christmas Time with the Judds	1987	
"Back Home"	The Judds with Alison Krauss	Darrell Scott; Bruce Robison	I Will Stand by You: The Essential Collection	2011	
"Beautiful Star of Bethlehem"	The Judds	A.L. Phipps	Christmas Time with the Judds	1987	
"Big Bang Boogie"	The Judds	Gary Nicholson; Naomi Judd	Big Bang Boogie	2000	
"Big Train from Memphis"	Carl Perkins, Jerry Lee Lewis, Roy Orbison, and Johnny Cash with June Carter Cash, Jack Clement, Dave Edmunds, Rebecca Evans, John Fogerty, The Judds, Chips Moman, Rick Nelson, Sam Philips, Marty Stuart, and Toni Wine	John Fogerty	Class of '55: Memphis Rock & Roll Homecoming	1986	
"Blue Nun Cafe"	The Judds	Harlan Howard; Brent Maher	Wynonna & Naomi	1984	
"Born to Be Blue"	The Judds	Mike Reid; Brent Maher; Mack David	Love Can Build a Bridge	1990	
"Bye Bye Baby Blues"	The Judds	Harlan Howard; Sonny Throckmorton; Brent Maher	Why Not Me	1984	
"Cadillac Red"	The Judds	Naomi Judd; John Jarvis; Craig Bickhardt	River of Time	1989	
"Calling in the Wind"	The Judds	Craig Bickhardt; Don Schlitz; Brent Maher	Love Can Build a Bridge	1990	
"Change of Heart"	The Judds	Naomi Judd	Wynonna & Naomi	1984	
"Cow Cow Boogie"	The Judds	Don Raye; Gene de Paul; Benny Carter	Heartland	1987	
"Cry Myself to Sleep"	The Judds	Paul Kennerley	Rockin' with the Rhythm	1985	
"Do I Dare"	The Judds	Don Schlitz; Craig Bickhardt; Brent Maher	River of Time	1989	
"Don't Be Cruel"	The Judds	Elvis Presley; Otis Blackwell	Heartland	1987	
"Don't You Throw That Mojo on Me"	Wynonna with Naomi Judd featuring Kenny Wayne Shepherd	Kenny Wayne Shepherd; Mark Selby; Tia Sillers	The Other Side	1997	
"Don't You Hear Jerusalem Moan"	The Judds	Traditional	"Had a Dream (For the Heart)" B-side	1983	
"Down Home"	The Judds	Naomi Judd	"Mama He's Crazy" B-side	1984	
"Dream Chaser"	The Judds	Jeffrey H. Bullock; Brent Maher	Rockin' with the Rhythm	1985	
"Drops of Water"	The Judds	Roy Freeland	Why Not Me	1984	
"Endless Sleep"	The Judds	Jody Reynolds; Dolores Nance	Why Not Me	1984	
"Flies on the Butter (You Can't Go Home Again)"	Wynonna with Naomi Judd	Chick Cannon; Allen Shamblin; Austin Cunningham,	What the World Needs Now Is Love	2003	
"Freedom" (Live)	The Judds	Laythan Armor; Bunny Hull	The Judds Reunion Live	2000	
"Girls Night Out"	The Judds	Brent Maher; Jeffrey H. Bullock	Why Not Me	1984	
"Girls with Guitars"	Wynonna with Lyle Lovett and Naomi Judd	Mary Chapin Carpenter	Tell Me Why	1993	
"Give a Little Love"	The Judds	Paul Kennerley	Greatest Hits	1988	
"Give a Little Love to Me"	The Judds	Craig Bickhardt; Don Potter; Brent Maher	Give a Little Love	1987	
"Grandpa (Tell Me 'Bout the Good Old Days)"	The Judds	Jamie O'Hara	Rockin' with the Rhythm	1985	
"Guardian Angels"	The Judds	Naomi Judd; John Jarvis; Don Schlitz	River of Time	1989	
"Had a Dream (For the Heart)"	The Judds	Dennis Linde	Wynonna & Naomi	1984	
"Have Mercy"	The Judds	Paul Kennerley	Rockin' with the Rhythm	1985	
"Hillbilly Willy"	Naomi & Christina	Rabon Delmore	The Early Sessions, July 1978	1997	
"I Know Where I'm Going"	The Judds	Don Schlitz; Craig Bickhardt; Brent Maher	Heartland	1987	
"I Will Stand by You"	The Judds	Robert Ellis Orrall; Angelo Petraglia; Steven Lee Olsen	I Will Stand by You: The Essential Collection	2011	
"I Wish She Wouldn't Treat You That Way"	The Judds	Kevin Welch; Walker Igleheart	Rockin' with the Rhythm	1985	
"I'm Falling in Love Tonight"	The Judds	Craig Bickhardt; Don Potter; Brent Maher	Heartland	1987	
"If I Were You"	The Judds	Harlan Howard; Sonny Throckmorton; Brent Maher	Rockin' with the Rhythm	1985	
"In My Dreams"	The Judds	Austin Cunningham	Love Can Build a Bridge	1990	
"Isn't He a Strange One"	The Judds	Kent Robbins	Wynonna & Naomi	1984	
"John Deere Tractor"	The Judds	Lawrence Hammond	Wynonna & Naomi	1984	
"John Deere Tractor"	The Judds	Lawrence Hammond	Love Can Build a Bridge	1990	
"Just Like New"	Wynonna with Naomi Judd and Jesse Winchester	Jesse Winchester	Tell Me Why	1993	
"Kentucky"	Naomi & Christina	Karl Davis	The Early Sessions, July 1978	1997	
"Lazy Country Evening"	The Judds	Naomi Judd	"Why Not Me" B-side	1984	
"Let Me Be Your Baby"	Naomi & Christina	Johnny MacRae; Bob Morrison	The Early Sessions, July 1978	1997	
"Let Me Tell You About Love"	The Judds	Carl Perkins; Paul Kennerley; Brent Maher	River of Time	1989	
"Light of the Stable"	The Judds	Steven Rhymer; Elizabeth Rhymer	A Country Christmas, Volume 3	1984	
"Love Can Build a Bridge"	The Judds	Naomi Judd; John Jarvis; Paul Overstreet	Love Can Build a Bridge	1990	
"Love Is Alive"	The Judds	Kent Robbins	Why Not Me	1984	
"Mama He's Crazy"	The Judds	Kenny O'Dell	Wynonna & Naomi	1984	
"Maybe Your Baby's Got the Blues"	The Judds	Troy Seals; Graham Lyle	Heartland	1987	
"More Fun Than the Law Allows"	The Judds	Hugh Prestwood	The Essential Judds	1995	
"Mr. Pain"	The Judds	Naomi Judd; Kent Robbins	Why Not Me	1984	
"My Baby's Gone"	The Judds	Dennis Linde	Why Not Me	1984	
"Not My Baby"	The Judds	Mike Reid; Mack David; Brent Maher	River of Time	1989	
"O Holy Night"	The Judds	Placide Cappeau; Adolphe Adam; John Sullivan Dwight	Christmas Time with the Judds	1987	
"Oatmeal Cookies"	Naomi & Christina	Maxine Sellers	The Early Sessions, July 1978	1997	
"Old Pictures"	The Judds	K.T. Oslin; Jerry Gillespie	Heartland	1987	
"One Hundred and Two"	The Judds	Paul Kennerley; Don Potter; Wynonna Judd	Love Can Build a Bridge	1990	
"One Little Teardrop"	The Judds	Brent Maher; Don Schlitz	The Essential Judds	1995	
"One Man Woman"	The Judds	Paul Kennerley	River of Time	1989	
"River of Time"	The Judds	Naomi Judd; John Jarvis	River of Time	1989	
"River Roll On"	The Judds	Wayland Holyfield; Brent Maher	Rockin' with the Rhythm	1985	
"Rockin' with the Rhythm of the Rain"	The Judds	Don Schlitz; Brent Maher	Rockin' with the Rhythm	1985	
"Rompin' Stompin' Bad News Blues"	The Judds	Naomi Judd; Don Schlitz	Love Can Build a Bridge	1990	
"Santa Claus Is Comin' to Town"	The Judds	Haven Gillespie; J. Fred Coots	Christmas Time with the Judds	1987	
"Silent Night"	The Judds	Franz Xaver Gruber; Joseph Mohr	Christmas Time with the Judds	1987	
"Silver Bells"	The Judds	Jay Livingston; Ray Evans	Christmas Time with the Judds	1987	
"Sleeping Heart"	The Judds	Don Potter; Rhonda Fleming Gill	Why Not Me	1984	
"Sleepless Nights"	The Judds	Boudleaux Bryant; Felice Bryant	River of Time	1989	
"Stuck in Love"	The Judds	Gary Nicholson; Kim Patton	Big Bang Boogie	2000	
"Talk About Love"	The Judds	Jack Sundrud; Carl Struck	Love Can Build a Bridge	1990	
"Tears for You"	The Judds	Mickey Jupp	Rockin' with the Rhythm	1985	
"That's What Makes You Strong"	The Judds	Jesse Winchester	Big Bang Boogie	2000	
"The '90s Was the '60s Turned Upside Down"	The Judds	Gary Nicholson; Marshall Chapman	Big Bang Boogie	2000	
"The Sweetest Gift"	The Judds	James B. Coats	Heartland	1987	
"This Country's Rockin'"	The Judds	Naomi Judd; Keith Sykes; Robert Johnson	Love Can Build a Bridge	1990	
"Turn It Loose"	The Judds	Don Schlitz; Craig Bickhardt; Brent Maher	Heartland	1987	
"Water of Love"	The Judds	Mark Knopfler	River of Time	1989	
"What Child Is This"	The Judds	William Chatterton Dix	Christmas Time with the Judds	1987	
"When I Reach the Place I'm Goin'"	Wynonna with Naomi Judd	Emory Gordy Jr. Joe Henry	Wynonna	1992	
"When King Jesus Calls His Children Home" (Studio Work Tape)	The Judds	Naomi Judd	The Judds Collection, 1983–1990	1992	
"Who Is This Babe"	The Judds	Don Potter	A Country Christmas, Volume 4	1985	
"Why Don't You Believe Me"	The Judds	Brent Maher; Don Potter; Don Schlitz	Heartland	1987	
"Why Not Me"	The Judds	Harlan Howard; Sonny Throckmorton; Brent Maher	Why Not Me	1984	
"Winter Wonderland"	The Judds	Dick Smith; Felix Bernard	Christmas Time with the Judds	1987	
"Working in the Coal Mine"	The Judds	Allen Toussaint	Rockin' with the Rhythm	1985	
"Young Love (Strong Love)"	The Judds	Paul Kennerley; Kent Robbins	River of Time	1989	
