= From the Heart: 15 Career Classics =

Compilation album by The Judds
- Released: 1992
- Recorded: 1983–1989
- Genre: Country
- Label: RCA Records
- Producer: Brent Maher; Norman Miller; Paul White

The Judds chronology
Greatest Hits Volume Two (1991)	From the Heart: 15 Career Classics (1992)	Christmas with The Judds and Alabama (1994)

From the Heart: 15 Career Classics is a compilation album by American country duo The Judds. It was released in 1992 by RCA Records. The album was co-produced by Brent Maher, Norman Miller and Paul White. From the Heart was the duo's first album exclusively released for the Canadian market. It contained a total of 15 tracks and reached Canadian record chart positions following its release.

== Background, content and chart performance ==
By 1992, The Judds had already disbanded as a musical duo. In 1990, Naomi Judd revealed a battle with Hepatitis C, which forced her to retire from performing. In 1992, Wynonna Judd embarked on a successful country solo career. Although the duo separated, their record label continued releasing compilations of their previously recorded material, which included this package. From the Heart: 15 Career Classics contained 15 tracks that had previously been recorded between 1983 and 1989. All of the songs had been issued as singles and been successful in the United States and Canada. From the Heart included the number one singles "Mama He's Crazy," "Grandpa (Tell Me 'Bout the Good Old Days)," "Have Mercy," "I Know Where I'm Going" and "Love Is Alive."

From the Heart was released in 1992 through Curb and RCA Records. It was released exclusively for the Canadian market, their first album to only be distributed there. The album was issued as both a compact disc and a cassette. The album also charted in Canada, reaching the number two positions on the RPM Country Albums chart in 1992. The album also peaked at number 42 on the RPM Top Albums chart, becoming The Judds's only compilation to chart on the Top Albums list. From the Heart also certified gold in sales from Music Canada for selling 50,000 units.

== Track listing ==
=== Compact disc version ===
From the Heart: 15 Career Classics (1992)
No.	Title	Writer(s)	Length
1.	"One Hundred and Two"	Wynonna Judd; Paul Kennerley; Don Potter	3:55
2.	"John Deere Tractor"	L. John Hammond	3:27
3.	"Young Love (Strong Love)"	Kennerley; Kent Robbins	4:20
4.	"Born to Be Blue"	Mack David; Brent Maher; Mike Reid	4:50
5.	"I Know Where I'm Going"	Craig Bickhardt; Maher; Don Schlitz	3:38
6.	"Don't Be Cruel"	Otis Blackwell; Elvis Presley	2:28
7.	"Mama He's Crazy"	Kenny O'Dell	3:14
8.	"Give a Little Love"	Kennerley	3:49
9.	"Grandpa (Tell Me 'Bout the Good Old Days)"	Jamie O'Hara	4:12
10.	"Girls Night Out"	Jeffrey Bullock; Maher	2:50
11.	"Have Mercy"	Kennerley	3:18
12.	"Love Is Alive"	Robbins	3:54
13.	"Guardian Angels"	John Barlow Jarvis; Naomi Judd; Schlitz	3:34
14.	"Maybe Your Baby's Got the Blues"	Graham Lyle; Troy Seals	3:31
15.	"Love Can Build a Bridge"	Jarvis; N. Judd; Paul Overstreet	5:22

=== Cassette version ===
Side one (1992)
No.	Title	Writer(s)	Length
1.	"One Hundred and Two"	W. Judd; Kennerley; Potter	3:55
2.	"John Deere Tractor"	Hammond	3:27
3.	"Young Love (Strong Love)"	Kennerley; Robbins	4:20
4.	"Born to Be Blue"	David; Maher; Reid	4:50
5.	"I Know Where I'm Going"	Bickhardt; Maher; Schlitz	3:38
6.	"Don't Be Cruel"	Blackwell; Presley	2:28
7.	"Mama He's Crazy"	O'Dell	3:14

Side two (1992)
No.	Title	Writer(s)	Length
1.	"Give a Little Love"	Kennerley	3:49
2.	"Grandpa (Tell Me 'Bout the Good Old Days)"	O'Hara	4:12
3.	"Girls Night Out"	Jeffrey Bullock; Maher	2:50
4.	"Have Mercy"	Kennerley	3:18
5.	"Love Is Alive"	Robbins	3:54
6.	"Guardian Angels"	Barlow Jarvis; N. Judd; Schlitz	3:34
7.	"Maybe Your Baby's Got the Blues"	Lyle; Seals	3:31
8.	"Love Can Build a Bridge"	Barlow Jarvis; N. Judd; Overstreet	5:22

== Personnel ==
All credits are adapted from the liner notes of From the Heart: 15 Career Classics.

Musical and technical personnel

- The Judds – lead vocals, harmony vocals
- Brent Maher – producer
- Norman Miller – compilation executive producer
- Paul White – compilation producer

== Charts ==
Chart (1992)	Peak position
Canada RPM Top Albums	42
Canada RPM Country Albums	2

== Certifications ==
Region	Certification	Certified units/sales
Canada (Music Canada)	Gold	50,000^{^}
^{^} Shipments figures based on certification alone.

== Release history ==
Region	Date	Format	Label	Ref.
Canada	1992	Compact disc	Curb Records; RCA Records	
Canada	1992	Cassette	Curb Records; RCA Records	
