= Their Finest Collection =

Compilation album by The Judds
- Released: November 2, 1991, 1996
- Recorded: 1983–1988
- Genre: Country
- Label: Curb; Dino; Superior
- Producer: Brent Maher

The Judds chronology
Love Can Build a Bridge (1991)	Their Finest Collection (1991)	Greatest Hits Volume Two (1991)

Their Finest Collection is a compilation album by American country duo The Judds. It was released in 1991 and 1993 via the Curb and Dino record labels. The album was the duo's third compilation release in their career. It was also their first compilation issued to international markets in Europe and Australia.

== Background and release ==
Their Finest Collection consisted of previously recorded material by The Judds during their career in the 1980s. The album contained songs first produced by Brent Maher. The same year of the album's release, Naomi Judd announced her retirement from the duo after being diagnosed with Hepatitis C. Their final studio album was released the previous year. The album contained a total of 16 tracks, 15 of which had previously been released as singles. Of the singles, 14 of them had been number one hits for the duo. This included "Mama He's Crazy," "Why Not Me," and "Rockin' with the Rhythm of the Rain."

Their Finest Collection was first released on November 2, 1991, but only to international markets outside their home market, the United States. It was released in Australia as both a vinyl LP and a compact disc. It was also released to markets in the Netherlands the same year. In 1993, the album was introduced to the German market. The album charted in one major publication. In the Netherlands, it reached number 61 on their album chart.

== Track listing ==
=== Compact disc version ===
Their Finest Collection (1991) (1993)
No.	Title	Writer(s)	Length
1.	"Mama He's Crazy"	Kenny O'Dell	3:14
2.	"Grandpa (Tell Me 'Bout the Good Old Days)"	Jamie O'Hara	4:14
3.	"Rockin' with the Rhythm of the Rain"	Brent Maher; Don Schlitz	2:40
4.	"Don't Be Cruel"	Otis Blackwell; Elvis Presley	2:28
5.	"Why Not Me"	Harlan Howard; Maher; Sonny Throckmorton	3:28
6.	"Water of Love"	Mark Knopfler	4:12
7.	"Give a Little Love to Me"	Craig Bickhardt; Maher; Don Potter	3:08
8.	"Girls' Night Out"	Jeffrey Bullock; Maher	2:54
9.	"Maybe Your Baby's Got the Blues"	Graham Lyle; Troy Seals	3:30
10.	"Young Love"	Paul Kennerley; Kent Robbins	4:21
11.	"Have Mercy"	Kennerley	3:22
12.	"Love Is Alive"	Robbins	3:59
13.	"Change of Heart"	Naomi Judd	3:32
14.	"Turn It Loose"	Bickhardt; Maher; Don Schlitz	3:40
15.	"I Know Where I'm Going"	Bickhardt; Maher; Schlitz	3:37
16.	"Cry Myself to Sleep"	Kennerley	3:40

=== Cassette and LP versions ===
Side one (1991)
No.	Title	Writer(s)	Length
1.	"Mama He's Crazy"	O'Dell	3:14
2.	"Grandpa (Tell Me 'Bout the Good Old Days)"	O'Hara	4:14
3.	"Rockin' with the Rhythm of the Rain"	Maher; Schlitz	2:40
4.	"Don't Be Cruel"	Blackwell; Presley	2:28
5.	"Why Not Me"	Howard; Maher; Throckmorton	3:28
6.	"Water of Love"	Knopfler	4:12
7.	"Give a Little Love to Me"	Bickhardt; Maher; Don Potter	3:08
8.	"Girls' Night Out"	Bullock; Maher	2:54

Side two (1991)
No.	Title	Writer(s)	Length
1.	"Maybe Your Baby's Got the Blues"	Lyle; Seals	3:30
2.	"Young Love"	Kennerley; Robbins	4:21
3.	"Have Mercy"	Kennerley	3:22
4.	"Love Is Alive"	Robbins	3:59
5.	"Change of Heart"	Judd	3:32
6.	"Turn It Loose"	Bickhardt; Maher; Schlitz	3:40
7.	"I Know Where I'm Going"	Bickhardt; Maher; Schlitz	3:37
8.	"Cry Myself to Sleep"	Kennerley	3:40

== Personnel ==
All credits are adapted from the liner notes of Collector's Series.

Musical and technical personnel

- The Judds – lead vocals, harmony vocals
- Brent Maher – producer

== Charts ==
Chart (1991)	Peak position
Netherlands MegaCharts Top Albums	61

== Release history ==
Region	Date	Format	Label	Ref.
Australia	November 2, 1991	Vinyl	Dino Music	
Australia	November 2, 1991	Compact disc	Dino Music	
Netherlands	November 2, 1991	Compact disc	Dino Music	
Germany	1996	Compact disc	Curb Records; Superior Records	
