= Last Encore Tour =

2010–11 concert tour by the Judds

- Tour by The Judds
- Logo for tour
- Associated album: I Will Stand by You: The Essential Collection
- Start date: November 26, 2010
- End date: October 29, 2011
- Legs: 3
- No. of shows: 30 in North America
- Website: The Judds 2011 Tour

The Judds concert chronology
- Power to Change Tour (2000); Last Encore Tour (2010-11)

The Last Encore Tour is a concert tour by American recording artist the Judds. The tour is the duo's first tour in 10 years, the last being the "Power to Change Tour" in 2000. The duo states this is the final farewell tour for the group. The tour began November 2010 and ended in December. In 2011, the duo announced a second United States leg for the summer of 2011. The tour predominately visited the United States.

The duo stated that the purpose for the tour was to reconnect with their fans. The tour's title was suggested by fans on Wynonna's website, as the duo had to come up with a name. Naomi Judd remarked "[I] was going to suggest 'The Cougar Tour'." They were joined on tour by the Palmetto State Quartet.

== Background ==
In 2009, the duo performed together for the first time in nine years the 2009 CMA Music Festival at LP Field. The performance spaced media outlets within the country music scene to hint to a reunion of the duo to be as early as 2010. During the summer of 2009, the duo made rare concert appearances together, including a stop at the Mohegan Sun Arena in Uncasville, Connecticut. The duo also opened a museum in Franklin, Tennessee, to commemorate their 25 years in country music. In the course of an interview for Billboard, Wynonna Judd stated the duo was open to perform on tour and recording new music in 2010. She continued, "It's 2010. It's been 25 years. It's take your mother to work year. It just feels like it's the right time". Judd wanted to bring her mother, Naomi Judd along for her annual "Classic Christmas Tour", however Naomi declined.

The tour was officially announced in February 2010. The duo would later headline the 2010 CMA Music Festival. At the press conference following the event, the duo remark the audience response for their 2009 show encouraged them to go on this trek one final time. Naomi stated her woman's intuition have her the courage to get back on stage and concert promoters assured her there was a demand for the tour. Also, the duo announced their first reality television series entitled The Judds, to air on OWN: Oprah Winfrey Network. The show will follow the duo's tour, while showing their mother-daughter relationship in both a public and private scope. To promote the tour, the duo appeared on Larry King Live, The Early Show, The Oprah Winfrey Show, Weekend Edition and Crook & Chase, while gracing the covers of Country Weekly and People: Country Special.

To introduce the tour, the duo stated:

"[Wynonna] This tour gives me a chance to enjoy where Mom and I are in our relationship. I look forward to celebrating our personal and professional journey…together. [Naomi] There is nothing like music and laughter to connect people. How I've missed that encounter with the very ones who've allowed us that awesome privilege! I'm counting the days till I can be back on my bus, visiting their towns."

== Setlist ==
2010

The Judds

1. "Had a Dream (For the Heart)"
2. "Girls' Night Out"
3. "Love Is Alive"
4. "Rockin' with the Rhythm of the Rain"
5. "Old Pictures"
6. "Cry Myself to Sleep"
7. "Give a Little Love"
8. "Young Love (Strong Love)"
9. "Maybe Your Baby's Got the Blues"
10. "River of Time"

Wynonna

11. "She Is His Only Need"
12. "No One Else on Earth"
13. "Rock Bottom"
14. "Only Love"
15. "Is It Over Yet"

The Judds

16. "Born to Be Blue"
17. "Guardian Angel"
18. "Get Together" (featuring the Palmetto State Quartet)

Intermission

Wynonna with the Palmetto State Quartet

18. "Burning Love"
19. "Let's Make a Baby King"
20. "How Great Thou Art"
21. "World Out of a Dream"
22. "I Want to Know What Love Is"

The Judds

23. "Let Me Tell You About Love" (featuring the Palmetto State Quartet)
24. "Don't Be Cruel" (featuring the Palmetto State Quartet)
25. "Mama He's Crazy"
26. "Why Not Me"
27. "Grandpa (Tell Me 'Bout the Good Ol' Days)"
28. "Love Can Build a Bridge"

Encore

29. "It's the Messiah"
30. "Silent Night"
2011

The Judds

1. "Had a Dream (For the Heart)"
2. "Girls' Night Out"
3. "Love is Alive"
4. "Rockin' with the Rhythm of the Rain"
5. "Cry Myself to Sleep"
6. "Give a Little Love"
7. "Young Love (Strong Love)"
8. "River of Time"

Wynonna

9. "She Is His Only Need"
10. "No One Else on Earth"
12. "Only Love"
13. "Is It Over Yet"
14. "How Great Thou Art"
15. "I Want to Know What Love Is"

The Judds

16. "Born to Be Blue"
17. "Let Me Tell You About Love" (featuring the Palmetto State Quartet)
18. "Don't Be Cruel" (featuring the Palmetto State Quartet)
19. "Mama He's Crazy"
20. "Why Not Me"

Encore

21. "Grandpa (Tell Me 'Bout the Good Ol' Days)"
22. "Love Can Build a Bridge"

=== Additional notes ===
- During the concert at the 1stBank Center in Broomfield, Colorado; the Judds were joined onstage by the Bristol Elementary School Choir (from Colorado Springs) to perform "Love Can Build a Bridge"
- "Ave Maria" was often performed by Wynonna during the evening’s encore, preceding “It’s the Messiah” and "Silent Night" as the final songs of the concert.

== Tour dates ==
Date	City	Country	Venue
North America—Leg 1
November 26, 2010	Ashwaubenon	United States	Resch Center
November 27, 2010	Mount Pleasant	United States	Soaring Eagle Entertainment Hall
November 28, 2010	Moline	United States	iWireless Center
November 30, 2010	Prior Lake	United States	Mystic Showroom
December 2, 2010	Columbus	United States	Value City Arena
December 3, 2010	Louisville	United States	KFC Yum! Center
December 4, 2010	St. Charles	United States	Family Arena
December 5, 2010	Council Bluffs	United States	Mid-America Center
December 7, 2010	Colorado Springs	United States	World Arena
December 8, 2010	Broomfield	United States	1stBank Center
December 9, 2010	Salt Lake City	United States	EnergySolutions Arena
December 11, 2010	Oakland	United States	Oracle Arena
December 12, 2010	Sacramento	United States	ARCO Arena
December 15, 2010	Los Angeles	United States	Nokia Theatre L.A. Live
December 16, 2010^{[A]}	Santa Ynez	United States	Samala Showroom
December 17, 2010	Rancho Mirage	United States	The Show at Agua Caliente
December 18, 2010	Las Vegas	United States	Mandalay Bay Events Center
December 19, 2010	Phoenix	United States	US Airways Center
North America—Leg 2
February 25, 2011	Niagara Falls	Canada	Avalon Ballroom Theatre
March 6, 2011^{[B]}	Plant City	United States	GTE Federal Credit Union Soundstage
March 19, 2011	Ledyard	United States	MGM Grand Theater
North America—Leg 3
June 10, 2011^{[C]}	Highland Park	United States	Ravinia Park Pavilion
June 25, 2011^{[D]}	Airway Heights	United States	Northern Quest Outdoor Pavilion
July 30, 2011^{[E]}	Camrose	Canada	Camrose Exhibition Grounds
August 19, 2011	Winnie	United States	Nutty Jerry's Winnie Arena
August 20, 2011	Durant	United States	Choctaw Event Center
September 3, 2011^{[F]}	Salem	United States	L. B. Day Amphitheatre
September 29, 2011^{[G]}	Minot	United States	All Seasons Arena
September 30, 2011^{[G]}	Minot	United States	All Seasons Arena
October 15, 2011	Weirsdale	United States	Grand Oaks Resorts Grounds
October 29, 2011	Marksville	United States	Mári Showroom at Paragon Casino

Festivals and other miscellaneous performances
^{A} This performance was a benefit concert for "Toys for Tots"
^{B} This performance was a part of the "Florida Strawberry Festival"
^{C} This performance is a part of "Ravinia Festival"
^{D} This performance is a part of "Pepsi Outdoor Summer Concerts"
^{E} This performance is a part of the "Big Valley Jamboree"
^{F} This performance is a part of the "Oregon State Fair"
^{G} These performances are a part of "Norsk Høstfest"

=== Box office score data ===
Venue	City	Tickets sold / available	Gross revenue
iWireless Center	Moline	2,940 / 5,125 (57%)	$149,464
Oracle Arena	Oakland	3,425 / 6,441 (53%)	$229,766
Nokia Theatre L.A. Live	Los Angeles	4,006 / 4,382 (91%)	$300,020
US Airways Center	Phoenix	3,188 / 7,865 (40%)	$214,768
TOTAL		13,559 / 23,813 (57%)	$894,018

== Critical reception ==
Overall, the tour received praise from both music critics and its spectators. Jon Bream (Star Tribune) notes despite Wynonna's vocal problems, the duo were still able to pull off a fantastic show at the sold out Mystic Showroom. He elaborates, "As Wynonna handed lead vocal chores to her backup singers, it seemed appropriate—for more reasons than one—that the Judds ended their Last Encore show with Silent Night". Gary Budzak (The Columbus Dispatch) called the evening a success for the Columbus audience. He states, "On more than 30 songs that spanned a quarter-century, The Judds have proved they still had the wherewithal to charm the crowd, whether it was Wynonna hugging a 4-year-old girl on stage; or Naomi kissing her husband, bass singer Larry Strickland, on a cover of Don't Be Cruel".

The praise continued with Kevin C. Johnson (St. Louis Post-Dispatch). The concert at the Family Arena served as a fitting finale for the duo. He explains, "This is The Last Encore tour, positioned as the final go-round for country music's most successful mother-daughter duo, which doesn't bode well for future Juddheads. Then again, we've already learned final doesn't always mean the end when it comes to the Judds, so time will tell". At the EnergySolutions Arena, Tom Wharton (The Salt Lake Tribune) says that the Judds were "going out in styles". He further comments, "The pair utilized a video screen behind them for retrospective moments, showing family photos and highlights from their career, as well as two big screens on either side of the stage that allowed an appreciative crowd of about 5,000 a chance to enjoy closeup views of the performers".

At the ARCO Arena, Carla Meyer (The Sacramento Bee) notes The Judds provided an intimate show, reminding the audience of the "good ol' days" She continues, "But the familiarity goes beyond song. Naomi, 64, and Wynonna, 46, long ago charmed and confided their ways into fans' hearts by publicly discussing their health woes, tricky family dynamics and Wynonna's weight battles and bad luck with men. Whether through their many appearances on "Oprah" or osmosis, you feel like you know them".
