= Number One Hits (The Judds album) =

Compilation album by The Judds
- Released: October 25, 1994
- Recorded: 1983–1989
- Genre: Country
- Length: 42:20
- Label: Curb; RCA Nashville
- Producer: Brent Maher; Don Potter

The Judds chronology
Reflections (1994)	Number One Hits (1994)	The Judds in Concert (1995)

Number One Hits is a compilation album by American country music duo The Judds. It was released on October 25, 1994, on the Curb and RCA Nashville labels. The album contained music produced by Brent Maher and Don Potter. Number One Hits was the eleventh compilation released in The Judds's discography. It contained 12 of their number one hits on the country charts during the 1980s. The album itself also reached major chart positions and sales certifications.

== Background and content ==
The album contained songs originally recorded by The Judds between 1983 and 1989. The original sessions were produced by Brent Maher, with some assistance from Don Potter. Number One Hits was released three years following the disbandment of The Judds. In 1991, they ended their musical partnership after Naomi Judd was diagnosed with Hepatitis C. Wynonna Judd embarked on her own music career in 1992. In the years that followed, their former labels (Curb/RCA) would issue several more compilation albums, including this package.

The album package consisted of 12 tracks, all of which had been number one hits on the Billboard Hot Country Songs chart. Among its songs was the duo's first number one hit, "Mama He's Crazy" (1984). Also included was 1986's "Grandpa (Tell Me 'Bout the Good Old Days)" and 1989's "Let Me Tell You About Love." The album also included the number one single "Change of Heart," which was composed by Naomi Judd. Despite including 12 songs, The Judds actually had 14 number one singles on the Billboard country chart. Missing from the collection was "Cry Myself to Sleep" (1986) and "Maybe Your Baby's Got the Blues" (1987).

== Release and chart performance ==
Number One Hits was released on October 25, 1994, via Curb and RCA Records. It was The Judds's eleventh compilation release. The package was issued as a compact disc and a cassette in its original release. In later years it would be re-issued as a music download to several sites, including Apple Music. Number One Hits reached number 39 on the Billboard Top Country Albums in 1995 after spending five weeks on the list. It also spent one week on the Billboard 200 albums chart, peaking at number 187 in June 1995. It was The Judds's fifth compilation to reach a charting position on the Billboard country albums survey. It was also their final charting album of the decade. In 2002, Number One Hits certified gold in sales from the Recording Industry Association of America for reaching sales of over 500,000 copies. It is the duo's most recent album certification from the RIAA.

== Track listing ==
=== Compact disc and digital versions ===
Number One Hits
No.	Title	Writer(s)	Length
1.	"Why Not Me"	Harlan Howard; Brent Maher; Sonny Throckmorton	3:29
2.	"Rockin' with the Rhythm of the Rain"	Maher; Don Schlitz	2:40
3.	"Mama He's Crazy"	Kenny O'Dell	3:14
4.	"Turn It Loose"	Craig Bickhardt; Maher; Schlitz	3:41
5.	"Grandpa (Tell Me 'Bout the Good Old Days)"	Jamie O'Hara	4:14
6.	"Girls' Night Out"	Jeffrey Bullock; Maher	2:53
7.	"Love Is Alive"	Kent Robbins	3:57
8.	"Change of Heart"	Naomi Judd	3:34
9.	"Have Mercy"	Paul Kennerley	3:21
10.	"Let Me Tell You About Love"	Kennerley; Maher; Carl Perkins	2:59
11.	"Young Love (Strong Love)"	Kennerley; Robbins	4:22
12.	"I Know Where I'm Going"	Bickhardt; Maher; Schlitz	3:37

=== Cassette version ===
Side one
No.	Title	Writer(s)	Length
1.	"Why Not Me"	Howard; Maher; Throckmorton	3:29
2.	"Rockin' with the Rhythm of the Rain"	Maher; Schlitz	2:40
3.	"Mama He's Crazy"	O'Dell	3:14
4.	"Turn It Loose"	Bickhardt; Maher; Schlitz	3:41
5.	"Grandpa (Tell Me 'Bout the Good Old Days)"	O'Hara	4:14
6.	"Girls' Night Out"	Bullock; Maher	2:53

Side two
No.	Title	Writer(s)	Length
1.	"Love Is Alive"	Robbins	3:57
2.	"Change of Heart"	Judd	3:34
3.	"Have Mercy"	Kennerley	3:21
4.	"Let Me Tell You About Love"	Kennerley; Maher; Perkins	2:59
5.	"Young Love (Strong Love)"	Kennerley; Robbins	4:22
6.	"I Know Where I'm Going"	Bickhardt; Maher; Schlitz	3:37

== Personnel ==
All credits are adapted from the liner notes of Number One Hits.

Musical and technical personnel

- Dennis Carney – photography
- Mario Casilli – photography
- Susan Eddy – art direction
- Naomi Judd – harmony vocals
- Wynonna Judd – lead vocals
- Brent Maher – producer
- Jim McGuire – photography
- Peter Nash – photography
- Don Potter – assistant producer (tracks 4, 10–12)
- Julie Wanca – design

== Chart performance ==
Chart (1995)	Peak position
US Billboard 200	187
US Top Country Albums (Billboard)	39

== Certifications ==
Region	Certification	Certified units/sales
United States (RIAA)	Platinum	1,000,000^{‡}
^{‡} Sales+streaming figures based on certification alone.

== Release history ==
Region	Date	Format	Label	Ref.
United States	October 25, 1994	Compact disc	Curb Records; RCA Records	
United States	October 25, 1994	Cassette	Curb Records; RCA Records	
Canada	1994	Compact disc	Curb Records	
Europe	1994	Compact disc	Curb Records	
United States	2000	Cassette	Curb Records	
United States	2000s	Music download	Curb Records	
