= Greatest Hits (The Judds album) =

Greatest hits album by The Judds
- Released: August 2, 1988
- Genre: Country
- Length: 34:38
- Label: RCA Victor
- Producer: Brent Maher

The Judds chronology
| Christmas Time with the Judds (1987) | Greatest Hits (1988) | River of Time (1989) |

Singles from Greatest Hits
- 1. "Give a Little Love" Released: June 6, 1988; 2. "Change of Heart" Released: October 17, 1988

Professional ratings
Review scores
| Source | Rating |
|---|---|
| AllMusic | 5/5 stars |

Greatest Hits is the first compilation album, released in 1988 by American country music duo The Judds. It features the singles "Give a Little Love" and "Change of Heart."

== Track listing ==
=== Original release ===
1. "Why Not Me" (Harlan Howard, Sonny Throckmorton, Brent Maher) – 3:31
2. "Rockin' with the Rhythm of the Rain" (Maher, Don Schlitz) – 2:41
3. "Mama He's Crazy" (Kenny O'Dell) – 3:14
4. "Give a Little Love" (Paul Kennerley) – 3:51
5. "Grandpa (Tell Me 'Bout the Good Old Days)" (Jamie O'Hara) – 4:15
6. "Girls Night Out" (Maher, Jeffrey Bullock) – 2:54
7. "Change of Heart" (Naomi Judd) – 3:35
8. "Have Mercy" (Kennerley) – 3:22
9. "Cry Myself to Sleep" (Kennerley) – 3:42
10. "Love Is Alive" (Kent Robbins) – 4:01

=== European version ===
1. "Why Not Me" (Harlan Howard, Sonny Throckmorton, Brent Maher) – 3:31
2. "Rockin' with the Rhythm of the Rain" (Maher, Don Schlitz) – 2:41
3. "Mama He's Crazy" (Kenny O'Dell) – 3:14
4. "Give a Little Love" (Paul Kennerley) – 3:51
5. "Grandpa (Tell Me 'Bout the Good Ol' Days)" (Jamie O'Hara) – 4:15
6. "I Know Where I'm Going" (Schlitz, Craig Bickhardt, Maher) – 3:39
7. "Don't Be Cruel" (Otis Blackwell, Elvis Presley) 2:29
8. "John Deere Tractor" (Lawrence John Hammond) – 3:31
9. "Have Mercy" (Kennerley) – 3:22
10. "Change of Heart" (Naomi Judd) – 3:35
11. "Girls' Night Out" (Maher, Jeff H. Bullock) – 2:54
12. "Cry Myself to Sleep" (Kennerley) – 3:42
13. "Love Is Alive" (Kent Robbins) – 4:01
14. "Maybe Your Baby's Got the Blues" (Troy Seals, Graham Lyle) – 3:32
15. "Had a Dream (For the Heart)" (Dennis Linde) – 3:12
16. "Turn It Loose" (Schlitz, Bickhardt, Maher) – 3:44

== Personnel ==
The Judds

- Naomi Judd - vocals
- Wynonna Judd - vocals

Additional musicians

- Eddie Bayers - drums
- Mark Casstevens - acoustic guitar
- Sonny Garrish - dobro, pedal steel guitar
- John Barlow Jarvis - piano
- Kirk "Jelly Roll" Johnson - harmonica
- Brent Maher - background vocals
- Bobby Ogdin - piano
- Don Potter - acoustic guitar, electric guitar, background vocals
- Gene Sisk - piano
- Larry Strickland - background vocals
- Jack Williams - bass guitar

== Charts ==
=== Weekly charts ===
| Chart (1988) | Peak position |
|---|---|
| Canadian Albums (RPM) | 53 |
| US Billboard 200 | 76 |
| US Top Country Albums (Billboard) | 1 |

=== Year-end charts ===
| Chart (1988) | Position |
|---|---|
| US Top Country Albums (Billboard) | 45 |
| Chart (1989) | Position |
| US Top Country Albums (Billboard) | 5 |
| Chart (1990) | Position |
| US Top Country Albums (Billboard) | 27 |
| Chart (1991) | Position |
| US Top Country Albums (Billboard) | 24 |
| Chart (1992) | Position |
| US Top Country Albums (Billboard) | 36 |

== Certifications ==
| Region | Certification | Certified units/sales |
|---|---|---|
| Canada (Music Canada) | Platinum | 100,000^{^} |
| United States (RIAA) | 2× Platinum | 2,000,000^{^} |
^{^} Shipments figures based on certification alone.
