= The Judds Reunion Live =

Live album by The Judds
- Released: May 9, 2000
- Recorded: December 31, 1999
- Venues: Phoenix, Arizona, U.S.
- Genres: Country; Contemporary country
- Length: 1:42:39
- Labels: Curb; Mercury
- Producer: Larry Strickland

The Judds chronology
| Big Bang Boogie (2000) | The Judds Reunion Live (2000) | I Will Stand by You: The Essential Collection (2011) |

The Judds Reunion Live is the second live album by American country duo The Judds. It was released on May 9, 2000, in conjunction with Curb Records and Mercury Records. It was produced by Larry Strickland and contained a total of 23 tracks. Reunion Live was the duo's second live effort issued in their career and their first album as a duo in almost ten years.

== Background and content ==
The Judds were among country music's most successful recording artists during the 1980s, having 14 number one singles on the country chart. In 1991, the duo parted ways after Naomi Judd was diagnosed with Hepatitis C. Instead, Wynonna Judd embarked on a successful solo career as Naomi recovered. By the late 1990s, Naomi's disease went into remission and the mother-daughter duo briefly re-united. Together, the duo recorded their first album since their departure at a concert held in Phoenix, Arizona on December 31, 1999.

The Judds Reunion Live was produced by Larry Strickland, a musician and the husband of Naomi Judd. It was Strickland's first time producing an album by the duo. The album comprised 23 tracks, which were all recorded live at the December 31 concert. Eight of the album's tracks were hits performed solely by Wynonna Judd. "I Saw the Light," "She Is His Only Need" and "Rock Bottom" are some of the Wynonna songs featured. The remaining tracks were performed by The Judds. The album featured most of their biggest hits, such as "Mama He's Crazy," "Why Not Me" and "Rockin' with the Rhythm of the Rain."

== Release and reception ==
Professional ratings
Review scores
| Source | Rating |
|---|---|
| AllMusic | 2.5/5 stars |

The Judds Reunion Live was released on May 9, 2000, on two labels: Curb Records and Mercury Records. It was the second live record in their career. The duo's first live effort was issued in 1995 and contained material first recorded in the 1980s. The album was issued on two compact discs. The first disc contained 12 tracks while the second contained 11. Reunion Live became the duo's first charting album of new material since 1991. It peaked at number 107 on the Billboard 200 albums chart in May 2000 after spending 2 weeks there. It spent 15 weeks on the Billboard Top Country Albums chart before reaching number 16 around the same time. In Canada, the album also peaked at number 16 on their country albums survey. Reunion Live was only given 2.5 out of 5 stars from AllMusic after in their review of the album. However, reviewers did praise several aspects of it. For example, writers noted that the album offered "a generous helping of songs". They also commented on the duo's stage presence, calling The Judds to have "old fashioned showmanship."

== Track listing ==
=== Disc one ===
Side one
| No. | Title | Writer(s) | Artist performing | Length |
|---|---|---|---|---|
| 1. | "Love Can Build a Bridge" | John Barlow Jarvis; Naomi Judd; Paul Overstreet | The Judds | 7:50 |
| 2. | "Girls' Night Out" | Jeffrey Bullock; Brent Maher | The Judds | 3:08 |
| 3. | "Rockin' with the Rhythm of the Rain" | Maher; Don Schlitz | The Judds | 3:10 |
| 4. | "Have Mercy" | Paul Kennerley | The Judds | 4:19 |
| 5. | "Love Is Alive" | Kent Robbins | The Judds | 4:21 |
| 6. | "Turn It Loose" | Craig Bickhardt; Maher; Schlitz | The Judds | 3:40 |
| 7. | "She Is His Only Need" | Dave Loggins | Wynonna Judd | 4:50 |
| 8. | "I Saw the Light" | Lisa Angelle; Andrew Gold | Wynonna Judd | 4:07 |
| 9. | "My Strongest Weakness" | N. Judd; Mike Reid | Wynonna Judd | 4:48 |
| 10. | "Give a Little Love" | Kennerley | The Judds | 4:14 |
| 11. | "River of Time" | Barlow Jarvis; N. Judd | The Judds | 4:25 |
| 12. | "I Know Where I'm Going" | Bickhardt; Maher; Schlitz | The Judds | 3:53 |

=== Disc two ===
Side one
| No. | Title | Writer(s) | Artist performing | Length |
|---|---|---|---|---|
| 1. | "The Wyld Unknown" | Cliff Downs; David Pack | Wynonna Judd | 4:00 |
| 2. | "Rock Bottom" | J.R. Cobb; Buddy Buie | Wynonna Judd | 3:21 |
| 3. | "Can't Nobody Love You (Like I Do)" | Danny Orton | Wynonna Judd | 3:40 |
| 4. | "Tuff Enough" | Kim Wilson | Wynonna Judd | 5:25 |
| 5. | "Come Some Rainy Day" | Billy Kirsch; Bat McGrath | Wynonna Judd | 3:51 |
| 6. | "Had a Dream (For the Heart)" | Dennis Linde | The Judds | 3:29 |
| 7. | "Mama He's Crazy" | Kenny O'Dell | The Judds | 4:02 |
| 8. | "Grandpa (Tell Me 'Bout the Good Old Days)" | Jamie O'Hara | The Judds | 5:36 |
| 9. | "Why Not Me" | Harlan Howard; Maher; Sonny Throckmorton | The Judds | 3:55 |
| 10. | "Auld Lang Syne" | Robert Burns | The Judds | 4:16 |
| 11. | "Freedom" | Laythan Armor; Bunny Hull | The Judds | 8:09 |

== Personnel ==
All credits are adapted from the liner notes of The Judds Reunion Live and Allmusic.

Musical personnel

- Robert Bailey, Jr. – background vocals
- Bruce Bouton – steel guitar
- Kim Fleming – background vocals
- Vicki Hampton – background vocals
- Kirk "Jelly Roll" Johnson – harmonica
- Mark T. Jordan – keyboards
- Ashley Judd – speaker
- Naomi Judd – harmony vocals
- Wynonna Judd – lead vocals
- Fats Kaplin – fiddle, harmonica, steel guitar
- Stephen Mackey – bass
- Rob McNelley – guitar
- Steve Potts – drums
- Harry Sharpe – guitar, keyboards

Technical personnel

- Brett Blanden – production coordination
- Tom Brooks – engineering
- Ed Cherney – mixing
- Ricky Cobble – digital editing
- John Cooper – engineer
- Richard Hanson – engineer
- Mark T. Jordan – music direction
- Julian King – digital editing, engineering, overdubs
- Danny Purcell – percussion
- Larry Strickland – producer

== Charts ==
| Chart (2000) | Peak position |
|---|---|
| Canada RPM Country Albums | 16 |
| US Billboard 200 | 107 |
| US Top Country Albums (Billboard) | 16 |

== Release history ==
| Region | Date | Format | Label | Ref. |
|---|---|---|---|---|
| United States | May 9, 2000 | Compact disc | Curb Records; Mercury Records | |
| United States | January 27, 2007 | Music download | MCA Records | |
