= Collector's Series (The Judds album) =

Compilation album by The Judds
- Released: August 21, 1990 (Canada); February 23, 1993 (U.S.)
- Recorded: 1983–1988
- Genre: Country; contemporary country
- Label: RCA Records
- Producer: Brent Maher

The Judds chronology
Across the Heartland (1989)	Collector's Series (1990)	Great Video Hits of The Judds (1990)

Collector's Series is a compilation album by American country duo The Judds. It was released on August 21, 1990, by RCA Records. It was produced by Brent Maher and consisted of eight tracks of previously recorded material. The album was part of RCA's "Collector's Series" compilations, which had also been released by several artists.

== Background, release and reception ==
Collector's Series contained eight tracks of material that had previously been released on The Judds's studio albums. The sessions were produced by Brent Maher, who had worked with the duo during their time at RCA and Curb Records. Music on the album dated as far back as 1984's extended play, Wynonna & Naomi. Three of the album's tracks were previously singles that had been major hits: "Love Is Alive," "Have Mercy" and "Cry Myself to Sleep." The fourth track, "Water of Love," had been released as a single internationally but did not chart. The remaining tracks were album cuts from the duo's previously released albums. However, the tenth track had not been released on a studio effort until the release of this compilation.

Collector's Series was released on August 21, 1990, in Canada only. It had been issued there as a compact disc. The album was not released in the United States until February 23, 1993, and was issued as a compact disc and cassette. The album did not reach any peak positions on national publication charts, notably Billboard. It also did not spawn any singles to radio. In later years, the album received a rating from Allmusic, which gave it three out of five stars. In June 1993, Collector's Series was certified gold in sales from the Recording Industry Association of America, becoming their third compilation to receive an RIAA certification.

== Track listing ==
=== CD version ===
Collector's Series (1990) (1993)
No.	Title	Writer(s)	Length
1.	"Love Is Alive"	Kent Robbins	3:54
2.	"Isn't He a Strange One"	Robbins	3:25
3.	"Sleepless Nights"	Felice and Boudleaux Bryant	2:28
4.	"Water of Love"	Mark Knopfler	4:18
5.	"Have Mercy"	Paul Kennerley	3:18
6.	"Cry Myself to Sleep"	Kennerley	3:37
7.	"I Wish She Wouldn't Treat You That Way"	Walker Iglehart; Kevin Welch	2:58
8.	"Tears for You"	Mickey Jupp	3:52

=== Cassette version ===
Side one (1993)
No.	Title	Writer(s)	Length
1.	"Love Is Alive"	Robbins	3:54
2.	"Isn't He a Strange One"	Robbins	3:25
3.	"Sleepless Nights"	Felice and Boudleaux Bryant	2:28
4.	"Water of Love"	Knopfler	4:18

Side two (1993)
No.	Title	Writer(s)	Length
5.	"Have Mercy"	Kennerley	3:18
6.	"Cry Myself to Sleep"	Kennerley	3:37
7.	"I Wish She Wouldn't Treat You That Way"	Iglehart; Welch	2:58
8.	"Tears for You"	Jupp	3:52

== Personnel ==
All credits are adapted from the liner notes of Collector's Series.

Musical and technical personnel

- The Judds – lead vocals, harmony vocals
- Brent Maher – producer

== Certifications ==
Region	Certification	Certified units/sales
United States (RIAA)	Gold	500,000^{^}
^{^} Shipments figures based on certification alone.

== Release history ==
Region	Date	Format	Label	Ref.
Canada	August 21, 1990	Compact disc	RCA Records	
United States	February 23, 1993	Compact disc	Curb Records; RCA Records	
United States	February 23, 1993	Cassette	Curb Records; RCA Records	
