= Greatest Hits Volume Two (The Judds album) =

Greatest hits album by The Judds
- Released: September 10, 1991
- Genre: Country
- Length: 38:26
- Label: RCA Records
- Producer: Brent Maher

The Judds chronology
Their Finest Collection (1991)	Greatest Hits Volume Two (1991)	From the Heart: 15 Career Classics (1992)

Singles from Greatest Hits Volume Two
- 1. "John Deere Tractor" Released: July 1991

Professional ratings
Review scores
Source	Rating
AllMusic	4.5/5 stars

Greatest Hits Volume Two is the second greatest hits collection released in 1991 by the American country music duo The Judds. It features ten tracks from their previous studio albums. No new material was recorded for this album. This was also their final release before Wynonna Judd parted for a solo career.

== Track listing ==
No.	Title	Writer(s)	Length
1.	"Let Me Tell You About Love"	Carl Perkins, Paul Kennerley, Brent Maher	3:01
2.	"John Deere Tractor"	L. John Hammond	3:31
3.	"Turn It Loose"	Don Schlitz, Craig Bickhardt, Maher	3:44
4.	"Young Love (Strong Love)"	Kennerley, Kent Robbins	4:23
5.	"Born to Be Blue"	Maher, Mike Reid, Mack David	4:50
6.	"I Know Where I'm Going"	Schlitz, Bickhardt, Maher	3:39
7.	"Had a Dream (For the Heart)"	Dennis Linde	3:12
8.	"Guardian Angels"	Schlitz, John Barlow Jarvis, Naomi Judd	3:36
9.	"Maybe Your Baby's Got the Blues"	Troy Seals, Graham Lyle	3:32
10.	"Love Can Build a Bridge"	Paul Overstreet, Judd, Jarvis	5:24
Total length:			38:26

== Personnel ==
The Judds

- Naomi Judd - vocals
- Wynonna Judd - vocals

Additional musicians

- Eddie Bayers - drums
- Craig Bickhardt - acoustic guitar
- Mark Casstevens - acoustic guitar, electric guitar
- Christ Church Choir - choir
- Sonny Garrish - dobro, pedal steel guitar
- Roy Huskey Jr. - upright bass
- John Barlow Jarvis - piano
- Kirk "Jelly Roll" Johnson - harmonica
- Farrell Morris - percussion
- Bobby Ogdin - organ, piano
- Carl Perkins - electric guitar
- Don Potter - acoustic guitar, electric guitar
- Jack Williams - bass guitar

== Charts ==
=== Weekly charts ===
Chart (1991)	Peak position
Canadian Country Albums (RPM)	2
US Billboard 200	54
US Top Country Albums (Billboard)	7

=== Year-end charts ===
Chart (1991)	Position
US Top Country Albums (Billboard)	69
Chart (1992)	Position
US Top Country Albums (Billboard)	28

== Certifications ==
Region	Certification	Certified units/sales
United States (RIAA)	Gold	500,000^{^}
^{^} Shipments figures based on certification alone.
