= I Will Stand by You: The Essential Collection =

Greatest hits album by The Judds
- Released: April 5, 2011
- Recorded: 1984–2010
- Genre: Country
- Length: 50:32
- Label: Curb

The Judds chronology
Greatest Hits: Limited Edition (2008)	I Will Stand by You: The Essential Collection (2011)

Professional ratings
Review scores
Source	Rating
AllMusic	3.5/5 stars

I Will Stand by You: The Essential Collection is a greatest hits collection by American country music duo The Judds. The album was released on April 5, 2011, via Curb Records, and includes twelve of The Judds' singles and two newly recorded songs. The album's first single, "I Will Stand by You", was released to country radio in late 2010.

== Track listing ==
1. "Mama He's Crazy" (Kenny O'Dell) - 3:14
2. "Why Not Me" (Harlan Howard, Sonny Throckmorton, Brent Maher) - 3:31
3. "Girls' Night Out" (Maher, Jeff H. Bullock) - 2:54
4. "Love Is Alive" (Kent Robbins) - 4:01
5. "Have Mercy" (Paul Kennerley) - 3:22
6. "Grandpa (Tell Me 'Bout the Good Old Days)" (Jamie O'Hara) - 4:15
7. "Rockin' with the Rhythm of the Rain" (Maher, Don Schlitz) - 2:41
8. "I Know Where I'm Going" (Don Schlitz, Craig Bickhardt, Maher) - 3:39
9. "Turn It Loose" (Schlitz, Bickhardt, Maher) - 3:44
10. "Young Love (Strong Love)" (Kennerley, Robbins) - 4:23
11. "Love Can Build a Bridge" (Paul Overstreet, Naomi Judd, John Barlow Jarvis) - 5:24
12. "Flies on the Butter (You Can't Go Home Again)" (Chuck Cannon, Austin Cunningham, Allen Shamblin) – 4:30
13. "I Will Stand by You" (Steven Lee Olsen, Robert Ellis Orrall) – 3:46
14. "Back Home" – 3:48 (Darrell Scott, Bruce Robison)
  - featuring Alison Krauss

== Personnel ==
Personnel on new tracks.

The Judds

- Naomi Judd – vocals
- Wynonna Judd – vocals

Additional musicians

- Tim Akers – keyboards, organ
- Eddie Bayers – drums
- Bob Britt – electric guitar
- Spencer Campbell – bass guitar
- Maurice Carter – background vocals
- Alison Krauss – vocals on "Back Home"
- Gordon Mote – piano, synthesizer
- Don Potter – banjo, acoustic guitar, mandolin
- Jaimee Paul Shires – background vocals
- Nir Z. – drums, percussion

== Charts ==
Chart (2011)	Peak position
US Top Country Albums (Billboard)	34
