= Reflections (The Judds album) =

Compilation album by The Judds
- Released: August 16, 1994
- Recorded: 1985–1989
- Genre: Country; Contemporary country
- Label: Curb; RCA Nashville
- Producer: Brent Maher; Don Potter

The Judds chronology
Christmas with The Judds and Alabama (1994)	Reflections (1994)	Number One Hits (1994)

Reflections is a compilation album by American country duo The Judds. It was released on August 16, 1994, via Curb and RCA Nashville. It was mostly produced by Brent Maher, but also included some assistance from Don Potter. Reflections was The Judds's sixth compilation release in their career and among several to reach a charting position on a Billboard survey.

== Background, content and release ==
Reflections was recorded in several sessions between 1985 and 1989. It was produced by Brent Maher and Don Potter. Reflections was released three years after The Judds had disbanded as a duo. The duo had 14 number one country singles in the 1980s. In 1991, they ended their musical partnership after Naomi Judd was diagnosed with Hepatitis C. In the years that followed, their former labels (Curb/RCA) would issue several more compilation albums, including reflections.

The album contained a total of eight tracks. Three of the songs had previously been hit singles: "Grandpa (Tell Me 'Bout the Good Old Days)," "Guardian Angels" and "Love Can Build a Bridge." Five of the additional tracks were songs previously included on The Judds' following studio albums: Heartland and River of Time. The fourth track was a gospel song entitled "When King Jesus Calls His Children Home," which had not been previously issued on an album.

Reflections was released on August 16, 1994, via Curb and RCA Records. It was the duo's sixth compilation release. It was issued as both a compact disc and a cassette. The album spent one week on the Billboard Top Country Albums chart in 1995, peaking at number 66. It was one of several Judds compilations to appear on the country albums chart. Reflections was later reviewed by Allmusic, who gave it 4.5 out of 5 stars.

== Track listing ==
=== Compact disc version ===
Reflections (1994)
No.	Title	Writer(s)	Length
1.	"Love Can Build a Bridge"	John Barlow Jarvis; Naomi Judd; Paul Overstreet	5:22
2.	"Guardian Angels"	Barlow Jarvis; Judd; Don Schlitz	3:34
3.	"The Sweetest Gift"	J.B. Coats	3:53
4.	"When King Jesus Calls His Children Home"	Judd	3:37
5.	"River of Time"	Barlow Jarvis; Judd	4:30
6.	"Are the Roses Not Blooming"	Thom Schuyler	3:12
7.	"Grandpa (Tell Me 'Bout the Good Old Days)"	Jamie O'Hara	4:12
8.	"Old Pictures"	Jerry Gillespie; K.T. Oslin	3:43

=== Cassette version ===
Side one
No.	Title	Writer(s)	Length
1.	"Love Can Build a Bridge"	Barlow Jarvis; Judd; Overstreet	5:22
2.	"Guardian Angels"	Barlow Jarvis; Judd; Schlitz	3:34
3.	"The Sweetest Gift"	Coats	3:53
4.	"When King Jesus Calls His Children Home"	Judd	3:37

Side two
No.	Title	Writer(s)	Length
5.	"River of Time"	Barlow Jarvis; Judd	4:30
6.	"Are the Roses Not Blooming"	Schuyler	3:12
7.	"Grandpa (Tell Me 'Bout the Good Old Days)"	O'Hara	4:12
8.	"Old Pictures"	Gillespie; Oslin	3:43

== Personnel ==
All credits are adapted from the liner notes of Reflections.

Musical and technical personnel

- Susan Eddy – art direction
- Naomi Judd – harmony vocals
- Wynonna Judd – lead vocals
- Brent Maher – producer
- Jim McGuire – photography
- Grffin Norman – design
- Don Potter – assistant producer (tracks 1, 6)

== Chart performance ==
Chart (1995)	Peak position
US Top Country Albums (Billboard)	66

== Release history ==
Region	Date	Format	Label	Ref.
United States	August 16, 1994	Compact disc	Curb Records; RCA Records	
United States	August 16, 1994	Cassette	Curb Records; RCA Records	
