= Across the Heartland =

Video by The Judds
- Released: September 27, 1989
- Genre: Country
- Label: MPI
- Director: Christine Dunbar; Bud Schaetzle

The Judds chronology
River of Time (1989)	Across the Heartland (1989)	Collector's Series (1990)

Across the Heartland is a video album by American country music duo The Judds. It was released on September 27, 1989, via the MPI Media Group. The collection was directed by Christine Dunbar and Bud Schaetzle. Across the Heartland was the duo's first video album release in their career. Several more would follow in the next decade. The album would also reach high sales and receive certifications for it success.

== Content, release and reception ==
Across the Heartland was The Judds's first video album in their recording career. The duo had released five studio albums at the time of its release. During that time, The Judds also had a series of number one hits on the Billboard Hot Country Songs chart. Across the Heartland contained a series of videos derived from their work up to that point. The album contained a mixture of stage, radio and television appearances. These appearances were videos of hits previously made famous by the duo, including "Why Not Me," "Grandpa (Tell Me 'Bout the Good Old Days)" and "Have Mercy." The package also included a special guest appearance by country artist, Gary Morris on the song "Leave Me Lonely."

Across the Heartland was released on September 27, 1989, via the MPI Media Group. The package was issued as a VHS recording tape containing a total of 12 tracks. By February 1990, the video package had sold more than 25,000 copies in the United States. This led to a gold certification from the Recording Industry Association of America that year. Across the Heartland was given a mixed review from Robert Hilburn of the Los Angeles Times. Hilburn disliked the dialogue interwoven throughout the album, however he did not find it distracting from the music. "Country music's most celebrated mother-daughter team spends almost as much time talking as singing in this 48-minute documentary-concert package, but for once the talk in a pop-video program doesn't detract," he commented.

== Track listing ==
Across the Heartland
No.	Title	Length
1.	"Have Mercy"
2.	"Dreamchaser"
3.	"I Know Where I'm Going"
4.	"Girls Night Out"
5.	"Don't Be Cruel"
6.	"Leave Me Lonely" (sung by Gary Morris)
7.	"Why Not Me"
8.	"Give a Little Love"
9.	"Grandpa"
10.	"Old Pictures"
11.	"Cry Myself to Sleep"
12.	"A Mother's Smile"

== Personnel ==
All credits are adapted from the liner notes of Across the Heartland.

- Christine Burrill – camera
- Christine Dunbar – director
- Fred Elmes – director of photography
- Candy Gonzalez – director photography
- Bob Keys – camera
- Bud Schaetzle – director
- John Sharaf – camera
- George Stephenson – camera

== Certifications ==
Region	Certification	Certified units/sales
United States (RIAA)	Gold	50,000^{^}
^{^} Shipments figures based on certification alone.

== Release history ==
Region	Date	Format	Label	Ref.
United States	September 27, 1989	VHS	MPI Media Group	
