= Why Not Me (album) =

Studio album by the Judds
- Released: October 15, 1984
- Recorded: May–July 1984
- Studio: Creative Workshop (Berry Hill, Tennessee)
- Genre: Country
- Length: 31:54
- Label: RCA Victor
- Producer: Brent Maher

The Judds chronology
Wynonna & Naomi (1984)	Why Not Me (1984)	Rockin' with the Rhythm (1985)

Singles from Why Not Me
- 1. "Why Not Me" Released: September 1984; 2. "Girls Night Out" Released: January 1985; 3. "Love Is Alive" Released: May 1985

Why Not Me is the debut studio album by American country music duo the Judds. It was released on October 15, 1984, by RCA Records and was produced by Brent Maher. Why Not Me was recorded in a traditional acoustic format using only a handful of musicians. It contained a collection of ten tracks, including their previously released single, "Mama He's Crazy." It also included three singles that would become number one hits: the title track, "Girls' Night Out" and "Love Is Alive."

Why Not Me received positive reviews from critics following its release. Critics praised the album's production detail as well as the duo's vocal harmonies. The album topped the Billboard country albums chart and reached other charts as well. The record would become the Judds' first full-length studio album and their most successful studio release to date. It has since received sales certifications from both the United States and Canada. The album has been reissued several times in different formats.

== Background ==
In 1983, the Judds (mother Naomi and daughter Wynonna Judd) signed their first recording contract with RCA Records in Nashville, Tennessee. The same year, they recorded their first album, a collection of six songs that comprised a "mini-album" entitled Wynonna & Naomi. The album included the duo's first major hit, "Had a Dream (For the Heart)." However, RCA had yet to release a full-length album by the pair. With the success of their debut single, the mother-daughter team were informed by RCA they would release their first full-length album. In addition, the label was going to include "Mama He's Crazy," a single that had been spawned from their mini-album offering. A music video was also to be made in correlation with the promotion of the record.

== Content and recording ==
The Judds recorded Why Not Me between May and July 1984 at the Creative Workshop, a studio located in Nashville. The duo had previously cut Wynonna & Naomi at the same location in sessions produced by Brent Maher. He would also produce their debut studio offering. Maher co-wrote the album's title track with Harlan Howard and Sonny Throckmorton. In her 1993 autobiography, Naomi Judd considered the song to have "one of the strongest melodic hooks I'd ever heard." Bandleader and guitarist, Don Potter, created guitar "licks," which Judd called in her book to be "a little slice of heaven." Also included on the album was Naomi Judd's song entitled "Mr. Pain." According to Judd, the song merged the stories of her friends' previous relationships and the conflicts that arose from them. Songwriter Kent Robbins collaborated with Judd on the track. He also wrote the song "Love Is Alive" for the album as well. Also included was a cover version of Jody Reynolds' "Endless Sleep."

In addition, Maher and Potter collaborated on the track "Sleeping Heart," which Judd called "sweetly sad" in her autobiography. Also included was the song "Bye Bye Baby Blues", which was also written in collaboration between Harlan Howard, Brent Maher and Sonny Throckmorton. As a producer, Maher chose a select group of session musicians for the album's recording. This included Don Potter, as well as Eddie Bayers on drums, Mark Casstevens on guitar, Bobby Ogdin on keyboards and Sonny Garrish on steel guitar. These musicians (among others) were previously included on the sessions for the duo's Wynnona & Naomi album. According to Judd's autobiography, Maher "liked to leave the room for the listener's imagination," with the use of minimal acoustic arrangements. Maher himself later commented on the album in an interview explaining that the album has withstood the test of time. He also commented that he was happy to have worked with the Judds in creating their first full-length studio project.

== Critical reception ==
Professional ratings
Review scores
Source	Rating
AllMusic	5/5 stars
Robert Christgau	B

Why Not Me received mostly positive reviews from critics following its release. In October 1984, Billboard took notice of the album's attention to detail and highlighted several tracks in their review: "The meteoric success story of this duo is no accident. It's predicated on exactly the kind of purity, acoustic brilliance and attention to detail that shines here on the sisters' first full album". Music journalist Robert Christgau gave the album a mostly favorable response, but disliked the production style at times, giving it a "B" rating: "After defying convention by indulging not a single soppy song on their tryout EP, they've flabbed the follow-up several times. And I bet they get even more complacent."

AllMusic's Thom Jurek called the album a "bona fide classic" and praised its "soaring harmonies" as well as the lead vocals from Wynonna Judd. He also noticed a connection between neo-traditional country and classic country from the early 60s, drawing comparisons to Patsy Cline. Jurek concluded by saying, "Of all their recordings, Why Not Me is their best-known, best-selling, and deservedly so. It's perfect."

== Release and chart performance ==
Prior to its release, "Mama He's Crazy" had already become a number one single on the Billboard Hot Country Songs chart. In September 1984, the title track was released as the first proper single. It spent a total of 22 weeks on the Billboard country songs chart before also reaching the top position that December. The song also peaked at number three on the Canadian RPM Country Singles chart. On October 15, 1984, the album itself was officially released on RCA Records. The album was issued originally as a vinyl LP, cassette and compact disc. In February 1985, the album reached number one on the Billboard Top Country Albums chart, becoming their first album to do so in their career. It would spend a total of 195 weeks on the list. In March 1985, Why Not Me peaked at number 71 on the Billboard 200 albums chart after a 26-week run.

With the success of the title track, "Girls' Night Out" was issued as the album's second single in January 1985. Spending 22 weeks on the Billboard country chart, it also topped the list. It reached the same position on the Canadian country singles chart as well. "Love Is Alive" was released in May 1985 and was the album's final single spawned. By August, the song had also topped the Billboard country chart and the became the duo's fourth number one single. It was the duo's third number one single in Canada as well. Why Not Me was also the Judds' first studio album to sell beyond 500,000 copies in the United States. In April 1985, the album certified gold for this sales achievement by the Recording Industry Association of America. In 1986, the company certified the album platinum in sales for exceeding one million copies. Then, in 1992 Why Not Me received a certification of two-times platinum for sales exceeding two million copies.

== Track listing ==
=== Vinyl version ===
Side one
No.	Title	Writer(s)	Length
1.	"Why Not Me"	Harlan Howard; Brent Maher; Sonny Throckmorton	3:29
2.	"Mr. Pain"	Naomi Judd; Kent Robbins	3:17
3.	"Drops of Water"	Roy Freeland	3:24
4.	"Sleeping Heart"	Kye Fleming; Don Potter	3:03
5.	"My Baby's Gone"	Dennis Linde	2:48

Side two
No.	Title	Writer(s)	Length
1.	"Bye Bye Baby Blues"	Howard; Maher; Throckmorton	2:52
2.	"Girls Night Out"	Jeffrey Bullock; Maher	2:50
3.	"Love Is Alive"	Robbins	3:54
4.	"Endless Sleep"	Dolores Nance; Jody Reynolds	3:06
5.	"Mama He's Crazy"	Kenny O'Dell	3:14

=== Cassette version ===
Side one
No.	Title	Writer(s)	Length
1.	"Why Not Me"	Howard; Maher; Throckmorton	3:29
2.	"Mr. Pain"	Judd; Robbins	3:17
3.	"Drops of Water"	Freeland	3:24
4.	"Sleeping Heart"	Fleming; Potter	3:03
5.	"My Baby's Gone"	Linde	2:48

Side two
No.	Title	Writer(s)	Length
1.	"Bye Bye Baby Blues"	Howard; Maher; Throckmorton	2:52
2.	"Girls Night Out"	Bullock; Maher	2:50
3.	"Love Is Alive"	Robbins	3:54
4.	"Endless Sleep"	Nance; Reynolds	3:06
5.	"Mama He's Crazy"	O'Dell	3:14

=== Compact disc versions ===
Why Not Me (1996) (2003)
No.	Title	Writer(s)	Length
1.	"Why Not Me"	Howard; Maher; Throckmorton	3:29
2.	"Mr. Pain"	Judd; Robbins	3:17
3.	"Drops of Water"	Freeland	3:24
4.	"Sleeping Heart"	Fleming; Potter	3:03
5.	"My Baby's Gone"	Linde	2:48
6.	"Bye Bye Baby Blues"	Howard; Maher; Throckmorton	2:52
7.	"Girls Night Out"	Bullock; Maher	2:50
8.	"Love Is Alive"	Robbins	3:54
9.	"Endless Sleep"	Nance; Reynolds	3:06
10.	"Mama He's Crazy"	O'Dell	3:14

== Personnel ==
All credits are adapted from the liner notes of Why Not Me.

The Judds

- Naomi Judd – harmony vocals
- Wynonna Judd – lead vocals

Musical personnel

- Eddie Bayers – drums
- Mark Casstevens – harmonica, rhythm guitar
- Sonny Garrish – dobro, steel guitar
- Bobby Ogdin – piano
- Don Potter – acoustic guitar, bandleader
- Gene Sisk – piano
- Jack Williams – bass

Technical personnel

- Bill Brunt – art direction
- Mario Cassill – photography
- Brent Maher – producer
- Brian Maher – engineer
- Joe Funderburk – assistant engineer
- Glenn Meadows, Inc. – mastering

== Charts ==
=== Weekly charts ===
Chart (1984–85)	Peak position
Canada Top Albums (RPM)	78
US Billboard 200	71
US Top Country Albums (Billboard)	1

=== Year-end charts ===
Chart (1985)	Position
US Top Country Albums (Billboard)	2
Chart (1986)	Position
US Top Country Albums (Billboard)	18

== Certifications ==
Region	Certification	Certified units/sales
Canada (Music Canada)	Platinum	100,000^{^}
United States (RIAA)	2× Platinum	2,000,000^{^}
^{^} Shipments figures based on certification alone.

== Release history ==
Region	Date	Format	Label	Ref.
United States	October 15, 1984	Vinyl	Curb Records; RCA Records	
United States	October 15, 1984	Cassette	Curb Records; RCA Records	
United States	October 15, 1984	Compact disc	Curb Records; RCA Records	
Canada	October 15, 1984	Vinyl	Curb Records; RCA Records	
Canada	October 15, 1984	Cassette	Curb Records; RCA Records	
Germany	October 15, 1984	Cassette	RCA Records	
South Korea	October 15, 1984	Cassette	RCA Records	
United States	1996	Compact disc	Curb Records; MCA Records	
United States	2003	Compact disc	Curb Records	
