= Number One Hits =

Number One Hits may refer to:

- Number One Hits (Tim McGraw album)
- Number One Hits The Bellamy Brothers album
- Number One Hits (The Judds album)
- Number One Hits Eddie Rabbitt album
- Number One Hits Elvis Presley album
