= Wynonna & Naomi =

EP by The Judds
- Released: February 1984
- Recorded: March 1983
- Studio: Creative Workshop (Berry Hill, Tennessee)
- Genre: Country
- Length: 26:34
- Label: RCA Victor
- Producer: Brent Maher

The Judds chronology
Wynonna & Naomi (1984)	Why Not Me (1984)

Singles from Wynonna & Naomi
- 1. "Had a Dream (For the Heart)" Released: December 1983; 2. "Mama He's Crazy" Released: April 1984

Wynonna & Naomi is the first extended play by American country duo The Judds. It was released in February 1984 by RCA Records and was produced by Brent Maher. It was the duo's first album release in their career and would be followed later in the year by their first full-length album, Why Not Me. The album was part of a "mini-album" marketing strategy designed by RCA to promote up-and-coming acts on their roster.

Wynonna & Naomi was named for the members of the duo, Naomi Judd and Wynonna Judd, who had just recently signed with RCA Records after several years attempting to gain a recording contract. The original version included six tracks, including one song composed by Naomi Judd. The album included the duo's first two hits: "Had a Dream (For the Heart)" and "Mama He's Crazy." The EP itself would also reach positions on the Billboard charts in 1984.

== Background ==
In 1983, The Judds signed their first recording contract with RCA Nashville. Consisting of mother, Naomi Judd, and daughter, Wynonna Judd, the duo auditioned on spot at the label's headquarters in Nashville, Tennessee. The pair would remain at RCA through the 1980s and have a series of major hits. Following their signing, the duo began making decisions on putting together their first album. RCA decided on first recording an extended play (mini-album of six songs), a marketing strategy that been successful for several other label performers. If successful, the intent was for the duo to release a full-length album at a later date.

== Content and recording ==
A total of six songs were chosen for the mini-album. In 1983, The Judds signed with Broadcast Music, Inc. so that Naomi could gain publishing royalties from songs she composed. Following this decision, Naomi's composition, "Change of Heart," was chosen for the record. In addition, "John Deere Tractor" was also chosen. According to Naomi Judd, the song's original composer could not be originally determined. Instead, a bank account was opened for his royalties from the track. The duo's producer, Brent Maher, played them "Had a Dream (For the Heart)," which was originally recorded by Elvis Presley. Despite original hesitations about recording an Elvis track, the duo eventually agreed cut it with a new arrangement.

Maher arranged for songwriters to meet The Judds in person to play songs they could possibly record. Nashville songwriter, Harlan Howard, was invited to dinner at The Judds' house where he played them his composition, "The Blue Nun Cafe." The duo agreed to recording it for the project. In addition, mother Naomi Judd went to several publishing companies to hear songs the duo could possibly record. At one of these companies, she met songwriter Kenny O'Dell, who played her his song "Mama He's Crazy." Naomi connected with its lyrics and decided to choose the song for the upcoming album.

Wynonna & Naomi was recorded in March 1983 at the Creative Workshop, also located in Nashville. Naomi wanted her and her daughter to stay focused on the recording process. To stay on task, the duo agreed on a dress codes and made a sign outside the studio door, according to her autobiography, Love Can Build a Bridge. The songs were cut in a total of three days. According to Naomi, the duo decided to lay down the vocals with only producer Brent Maher and musician, Don Potter present. "Our singing came from instinct, deep and spontaneous," she recalled in her 1993 book. The album was completed at a budget of $36,000.

== Release and reception ==
Professional ratings
Review scores
Source	Rating
AllMusic	4.5/5 stars
Robert Christgau	A−

Before the album's release, "Had a Dream (For the Heart)" was issued as the lead single. It was first released in December 1983 on RCA Records. The song spent a total of 18 weeks on the Billboard Hot Country Songs chart. In March 1984, the single reached number 17 on the chart, becoming the duo's first major hit and top 20 single. On the Canadian RPM Country Singles chart, it reached a similar top 20 position. In February 1984, Wynonna & Naomi was officially released on RCA. The record was originally offered in 12 inch vinyl and as an audio cassette.

Wynonna & Naomi became the duo's first charting album released on the Billboard Top Country Albums survey, where it peaked at number eight. It also reached number 153 on the Billboard 200. In April 1984, "Mama He's Crazy" was spawned as the second single from the extended play. It became The Judds' first of several number one hits during the 1980s. In total, "Mama He's Crazy" spent 23 weeks on the Billboard country songs chart before topping the list in August 1984. It was also their first number one Canadian country single.

Wynonna & Naomi received positive reviews from writers and critics. Music journalist Robert Christgau gave the album an "A−" rating in his review: "They've got a gimmick--not only are they a mother-and-daughter act, you can't tell who's who. But the music's simply solid--three fine ones plus three pretty good ones equals the most actively pleasurable Nashville of the year." Thom Owens of AllMusic praised the mother-daughter harmonies the quality of material found on the album. He concluded by comparing the album to future releases: "The best moments on The Judds have been compiled on their numerous hit compilation, yet it remains a pleasant listen for most dedicated fans."

== Track listing ==
=== Vinyl version ===
Side one
No.	Title	Writer(s)	Length
1.	"Had a Dream (For the Heart)"	Dennis Linde	3:10
2.	"John Deere Tractor"	Lawrence Hammond	3:28
3.	"Isn't He a Strange One"	Kent Robbins	3:25

Side two
No.	Title	Writer(s)	Length
1.	"Blue Nun Cafe"	Harlan Howard; Brent Maher	2:27
2.	"Change of Heart"	Naomi Judd	3:28
3.	"Mama He's Crazy"	Kenny O'Dell	3:11

=== Cassette version ===
Side one
No.	Title	Writer(s)	Length
1.	"Had a Dream (For the Heart)"	Linde	3:10
2.	"John Deere Tractor"	Hammond	3:28
3.	"Isn't He a Strange One"	Robbins	3:25
4.	"Change of Heart"	Judd	3:28
5.	"Mama He's Crazy"	O'Dell	3:11

Side two
No.	Title	Writer(s)	Length
1.	"Blue Nun Cafe"	Howard; Maher	2:27
2.	"Change of Heart"	Judd	3:28
3.	"Mama He's Crazy"	O'Dell	3:11
4.	"John Deere Tractor"	Hammond	3:28
5.	"Isn't He a Strange One"	Robbins	3:25

=== Compact disc version ===
Wynonna & Naomi (1988)
No.	Title	Writer(s)	Length
1.	"Had a Dream (For the Heart)"	Linde	3:12
2.	"John Deere Tractor"	Hammond	3:30
3.	"Isn't He a Strange One"	Robbins	3:26
4.	"Mama He's Crazy"	O'Dell	3:17
5.	"Change of Heart"	Judd	3:33
6.	"Blue Nun Cafe"	Howard; Maher	2:30
7.	"Cry Myself to Sleep"	Paul Kennerley	3:44
8.	"Dreamchaser"	Jeffrey Bullock; Maher	3:44
Total length:			26:34

== Personnel ==
All credits are adapted from the liner notes of Wynonna & Naomi.

The Judds

- Naomi Judd – harmony vocals
- Wynonna Judd – lead vocals

Musical personnel

- Eddie Bayers – drums
- Mark Casstevens – harmonica, rhythm guitar
- Sonny Garrish – Dobro, steel guitar
- Bobby Ogdin – piano
- Don Potter – acoustic guitar, bandleader
- Jack Williams – bass guitar

Technical personnel

- Brent Maher – producer

== Charts ==
Chart (1983–85)	Peak position
US Billboard 200	153
US Top Country Albums (Billboard)	8
Chart (1989)	Peak position
US Top Country Albums (Billboard)	67

== Certifications ==
Region	Certification	Certified units/sales
United States (RIAA)	Gold	500,000^{^}
^{^} Shipments figures based on certification alone.

== Release history ==
Region	Date	Format	Label	Ref.
United States	February 1984	Vinyl	Curb Records; RCA Records	
United States	February 1984	Cassette	Curb Records; RCA Records	
Canada	February 1984	Vinyl	Curb Records; RCA Records	
Canada	February 1984	Cassette	Curb Records; RCA Records	
Australia and New Zealand	February 1984	Vinyl	Curb Records; RCA Records	
United States	1988	Vinyl	Curb Records; RCA Records	
United States	1988	Cassette	Curb Records; RCA Records	
United States	1988	Compact Disc	Curb Records; RCA Records	
