= The Judds (TV series) =

American reality-documentary television series

- Genre: Documentary
- Starring: Naomi Judd; Wynonna Judd
- Country of origin: United States
- Original language: English
- No. of seasons: 1
- No. of episodes: 6

Production
- Executive producers: Gay Rosenthal; Bruce Toms; Kerry Hansen; Naomi Judd; Wynonna Judd
- Running time: 40 minutes (excluding commercials)
- Production company: Gay Rosenthal Productions

Original release
- Network: OWN: Oprah Winfrey Network
- Release: April 10 – May 16, 2011

The Judds is an American reality television-documentary series on OWN: The Oprah Winfrey Network, featuring country music singer Naomi Judd and her daughter, singer-guitarist Wynonna Judd, who performed and recorded music together as the Judds, their success peaking in the 1980s and 1990s. The special docuseries, which debuted on April 10, 2011, chronicled the Judds as they traveled the country making music, performing for fans but also dealing with topics including negativity, gratitude, familial history and repressed emotions; a therapist was a featured member of the series.

== Premise ==
The docuseries followed the daily life and interactions of mother–daughter Grammy Award winners Wynonna and Naomi Judd while they rehearsed and perfected their music, all in-preparation for their first tour in ten years. The series also shed light on the duo's personal lives as they worked with a counselor to strengthen their bond; the Judds discussed a range of issues from everyday treatment of one another and humility to kindness and grace, while also recognizing areas where each could improve.

== Episodes ==
No.	Title	Original release date
1	"Naomi's Secret"	April 10, 2011
Pilot. Naomi opens-up about a traumatic family experience from her childhood.
2	"Hurricane Wynonna"	April 17, 2011
Naomi and Wynonna put all the efforts they've been practicing for into their opening-night concert in Green Bay.
3	"Heartbreak in the Heartland"	April 24, 2011
Naomi works to overcome dark memories of childhood abuse by a relative.
4	"Naomi Tells Her Secret"	May 2, 2011
Naomi strives to be more honest with Wynonna about her childhood abuse, along with learning how to cope and accept the things one is powerless over. Then, Hollywood actress Ashley Judd, Naomi’s younger daughter (and Wynonna’s half-sister) releases a tell-all biography, with the book’s content leaving Wynonna in a state of shock. The details of Ashley’s revelations were more personal and revealing than the Judds had expected.
5	"Demons in the City of Angels"	May 9, 2011
Wynonna and Naomi fly back to L.A. and visit one of their past homes, from before the two were famous, which only stirs-up horrible memories for both.
6	"Wynonna's Surprise"	May 16, 2011
The duo has their final concert performance, which leads to Wynonna surprising Naomi with something special.
