= It Would Be You (song) =

Single by Gary Allan

from the album It Would Be You
- B-side: "Send Back My Heart"
- Released: February 10, 1998
- Recorded: 1998
- Genre: Country
- Length: 2:55
- Label: Decca Nashville 72039
- Songwriters: Dana Hunt Black; Kent Robbins
- Producers: Byron Hill; Mark Wright

Gary Allan singles chronology
"Living in a House Full of Love" (1997)	"It Would Be You" (1998)	"No Man in His Wrong Heart" (1999)

"It Would Be You" is a song written by Kent Robbins and Dana Hunt Black and recorded by American country music artist Gary Allan. It was released in February 1998 as the first single and title track from Allan's 1998 album of the same name. It reached No. 7 on the U.S. Billboard Hot Country Singles and Tracks chart, remaining in the Top 10 after 21 weeks of radio play. As a result, this song became Allan's second Top 10 hit on the country charts, after his debut single "Her Man" in 1996–1997, which also reached No. 7.

== Chart performance ==
Chart (1998)	Peak position
Canada Country Singles (RPM)	23
US Bubbling Under Hot 100 (Billboard)	1
US Hot Country Songs (Billboard)	7

=== Year-end charts ===
Chart (1998)	Position
US Country Songs (Billboard)	55

== Music video ==
The music video premiered on The CMT Delivery Room on February 14, 1998, and was directed by Gerry Wenner.
