= One Man Woman (The Judds song) =

Single by The Judds

from the album River of Time
- B-side: "Sleepless Nights"
- Released: November 20, 1989
- Genre: Country
- Length: 4:05
- Label: RCA/Curb
- Songwriter: Paul Kennerley
- Producer: Brent Maher

The Judds singles chronology
"Let Me Tell You About Love" (1989)	"One Man Woman" (1989)	"Guardian Angels" (1990)

"One Man Woman" is a song written by Paul Kennerley, and recorded by American country music duo The Judds. It was released in November 1989 as the third single from the album River of Time. The song reached number 8 on the Billboard Hot Country Singles & Tracks chart.

== Chart performance ==
"One Man Woman" debuted on the U.S. Billboard Hot Country Singles & Tracks for the week of November 25, 1989.

Chart (1989–1990)	Peak position
Canada Country Singles (RPM)	14
US Hot Country Songs (Billboard)	8

=== Year-end charts ===
Chart (1990)	Position
US Country Songs (Billboard)	66
