= River of Time (The Judds album) =

Studio album by the Judds
- Released: April 4, 1989
- Recorded: 1988
- Studio: AIR (London, UK); Creative Recording (Berry Hill, Tennessee)
- Genre: Country
- Length: 36:24
- Label: RCA Victor
- Producer: Brent Maher

The Judds chronology
| Greatest Hits (1988) | River of Time (1989) | Across the Heartland (1989) |

Singles from River of Time
- 1. "Young Love (Strong Love)" Released: February 20, 1989; 2. "Water of Love" Released: April 1989; 3. "Let Me Tell You About Love" Released: June 26, 1989; 4. "One Man Woman" Released: November 20, 1989; 5. "Guardian Angels" Released: March 31, 1990

River of Time is the fifth studio album by American country music duo the Judds, released on April 4, 1989, by RCA Records. It features the singles "Young Love (Strong Love)," "Let Me Tell You About Love," "One Man Woman" and "Guardian Angels." While the first two singles reached No. 1 on the country charts, the latter two peaked at Nos. 8 and 16, respectively, with "Guardian Angels" being their first single since 1983's "Had a Dream (For the Heart)" to miss Top Ten. "Do I Dare" is not included on the cassette or vinyl versions.

== Critical reception ==
Professional ratings
Review scores
| Source | Rating |
|---|---|
| AllMusic | 4/5 stars |
| Stereo Review | nice |

Billboard reviewed the album in the April 15, 1989, issue. The review said, "Although this album has fewer memorable songs than the stunning Heartland, it is still a pure sonic feast. Wynonna Judd's straining-at-the-leash lead vocals perfectly counterpoint the sparkling minimalist instrumentation, and there is a full range of styles–from the breezy jazziness of 'Not My Baby' to the canonical country of 'Guardian Angels'. Among the song contributors are Mark Knopfler, Felice & Boudleaux Bryant, Carl Perkins, Don Schlitz, the ever-present Paul Kennerley, and Naomi Judd."

Cashbox published a review in their April 15, 1989, issue that said, "Wynonna and Naomi present possibly their last album for Curb/RCA with all the style and flair inherent in their usual recorded efforts. Wynonna shows an even greater depth of vocal delivery here, especially on tunes like “One Woman Man” and "Cadillac Red" (which was co- written by Naomi with J. Jarvis and Craig Bickhardt). Naomi also co-wrote two other tunes ("River of Time" and "Guardian Angels"), both of which display the emergence of a talented songwriter. Now at number 11 on the top 100 with "Young Love", the Judds should continue their charting sweep with several other hot tunes. Best cut overall would have to be the Mark Knopfler-penned "Water of Love”, a soul-wrencher with stellar guitar accompaniment."

== Track listing ==
| No. | Title | Writer(s) | Length |
|---|---|---|---|
| 1. | "One Man Woman" | Paul Kennerley | 4:08 |
| 2. | "Young Love (Strong Love)" | Kennerley; Kent Robbins | 4:27 |
| 3. | "Not My Baby" | Brent Maher; Mike Reid; Mack David | 3:37 |
| 4. | "Let Me Tell You About Love" | Carl Perkins; Kennerley; Maher | 3:01 |
| 5. | "Sleepless Nights" | Felice Bryant; Boudleaux Bryant | 2:29 |
| 6. | "Water of Love" | Mark Knopfler | 4:21 |
| 7. | "River of Time" | John Barlow Jarvis; Naomi Judd | 4:33 |
| 8. | "Cadillac Red" | Craig Bickhardt; Jarvis; Judd | 3:23 |
| 9. | "Do I Dare" | Don Schlitz; Bickhardt; Maher | 3:23 |
| 10. | "Guardian Angels" | Schlitz; Jarvis; Judd | 3:37 |
| Total length: | | | 36:24 |

== Personnel ==
As listed in liner notes.

The Judds

- Naomi Judd – vocals
- Wynonna Judd – vocals

Additional musicians

- Eddie Bayers – drums
- Mark Casstevens – acoustic guitar
- Quitman Dennis – clarinet
- Sonny Garrish – pedal steel guitar, dobro
- Roy Huskey, Jr. – double bass on "Let Me Tell You About Love"
- John Barlow Jarvis – piano
- Kirk "Jelly Roll" Johnson – harmonica
- Mark Knopfler – electric guitar on "Water of Love"
- Farrell Morris – percussion
- Craig Nelson – double bass on "Sleepless Nights"
- Bobby Ogdin – piano, Hammond B-3 organ
- Carl Perkins – electric lead guitar on "Let Me Tell You About Love"
- Don Potter – acoustic guitar, electric guitar on "Sleepless Nights"
- Jack Williams - bass guitar

== Charts ==
=== Weekly charts ===
| Chart (1989) | Peak position |
|---|---|
| Canadian Country Albums (RPM) | 1 |
| US Billboard 200 | 51 |
| US Top Country Albums (Billboard) | 2 |

=== Year-end charts ===
| Chart (1989) | Position |
|---|---|
| US Top Country Albums (Billboard) | 13 |
| Chart (1990) | Position |
| US Top Country Albums (Billboard) | 35 |

== Certifications ==
| Region | Certification | Certified units/sales |
|---|---|---|
| United States (RIAA) | Gold | 500,000^{^} |
^{^} Shipments figures based on certification alone.
