= Rockin' with the Rhythm =

Studio album by the Judds
- Released: October 30, 1985
- Studio: Creative Workshop (Nashville, Tennessee)
- Genre: Country
- Length: 34:29
- Label: RCA Victor
- Producer: Brent Maher

The Judds chronology
Why Not Me (1984)	Rockin' with the Rhythm (1985)	Heartland (1987)

Singles from Rockin' with the Rhythm
- 1. "Have Mercy" Released: September 1985; 2. "Grandpa (Tell Me 'Bout the Good Ol' Days)" Released: January 1986; 3. "Rockin' with the Rhythm of the Rain" Released: May 1986; 4. "Cry Myself to Sleep" Released: September 1986

Professional ratings
Review scores
Source	Rating
AllMusic	3.5/5 stars

Rockin' with the Rhythm is the second studio album by American country music duo the Judds, released on October 30, 1985, by RCA Records. It features the singles "Have Mercy," "Grandpa (Tell Me 'Bout the Good Old Days)," "Rockin' with the Rhythm of the Rain" and "Cry Myself to Sleep"; all four singles reached No. 1 on Billboard's Hot Country Singles & Tracks chart.

The album has been certified Platinum by the RIAA for sales of 1 million copies. It was named the Top Country Album of 1986 by Billboard, and was nominated for Favorite Country Album at the 1987 American Music Awards.

== Track listing ==
No.	Title	Writer(s)	Length
1.	"Have Mercy"	Paul Kennerley	3:23
2.	"Grandpa (Tell Me 'Bout the Good Old Days)"	Jamie O'Hara	4:15
3.	"Working in the Coal Mine"	Allen Toussaint	3:04
4.	"If I Were You"	Harlan Howard; Brent Maher; Sonny Throckmorton	2:51
5.	"Rockin' with the Rhythm of the Rain"	Maher; Don Schlitz	2:41
6.	"Tears for You"	Mickey Jupp	3:54
7.	"Cry Myself to Sleep"	Kennerley	3:44
8.	"River Roll On"	Wayland Holyfield; Maher	3:52
9.	"I Wish She Wouldn't Treat You That Way"	Walker Igleheart; Kevin Welch	3:00
10.	"Dream Chaser"	Jeffrey Bullock; Maher	3:44
Total length:			34:28

== Personnel ==
The Judds

- Naomi Judd – vocals
- Wynonna Judd – vocals

Additional musicians

- Eddie Bayers – drums
- Mark Casstevens – acoustic guitar
- Sonny Garrish – dobro, pedal steel guitar
- Bobby Ogdin – piano
- Don Potter – acoustic guitar, electric guitar
- David Schnaufer – dulcimer, Jew's harp
- Gene Sisk – piano
- Jack Williams – bass guitar

== Charts ==
=== Weekly charts ===
Chart (1985–1986)	Peak position
US Billboard 200	66
US Top Country Albums (Billboard)	1

=== Year-end charts ===
Chart (1986)	Position
US Billboard 200	71
US Top Country Albums (Billboard)	1
