= John Deere Tractor (song) =

Single by The Judds

from the album Greatest Hits Volume Two
- B-side: "Calling in the Wind"
- Released: July 1991
- Genre: Country
- Length: 3:28
- Label: RCA/Curb
- Songwriter(s): L. Allen Hammond
- Producer(s): Brent Maher

The Judds singles chronology
"One Hundred and Two" (1991)	"John Deere Tractor" (1991)	"Stuck in Love" (2000)

"John Deere Tractor" is a song written by Lawrence Allen Hammond (as L. Allen Hammond) and first recorded by American bluegrass artist Larry Sparks for his 1980 album John Deere Tractor. The song was later made famous by American country music duo The Judds who first released the song on their 1984 debut EP, Wynonna & Naomi. New vocals were recorded over the original instrumental in 1990 for their final album, Love Can Build a Bridge. This version was included on Greatest Hits Volume Two and released as a single in July 1991, peaking at number 29 on the Billboard Hot Country Songs chart.

In 2022, bluegrass artist Billy Strings recorded a version of "John Deere Tractor" for his album Me / And / Dad.

== Chart performance ==
Chart (1991)	Peak position
US Hot Country Songs (Billboard)	29
Canadian RPM Country Tracks	60
