= Let Me Tell You About Love =

Single by The Judds

from the album River of Time
- B-side: "Water of Love"
- Released: June 26, 1989
- Genre: Country
- Length: 3:01
- Label: RCA/Curb
- Songwriters: Carl Perkins; Paul Kennerley; Brent Maher
- Producer: Brent Maher

The Judds singles chronology
"Young Love (Strong Love)" (1989)	"Let Me Tell You About Love" (1989)	"One Man Woman" (1989)

"Let Me Tell You About Love" is a song written by Carl Perkins, Paul Kennerley and Brent Maher, and recorded by American country music duo The Judds. It was released in June 1989 as the second single from the album River of Time. The song was The Judds' fourteenth and final number one on the country chart. The RCA/Curb single, 8947-7-R, b/w "Water of Love", went to number one for one week and spent a total of fifteen weeks on the country chart. The record also reached number one on the Canadian RPM Country Tracks chart.

Carl Perkins played lead guitar on the recording, and session musicians included double bassist Roy Huskey, Jr. and drummer Eddie Bayers.

The song appeared on their 1991 Greatest Hits Volume Two collection. It was also the last country number one by a duo or vocal collaboration until Brooks & Dunn's "Brand New Man" in 1991.

== Content ==
The song is about a romance between "Sheba" and Solomon. The historical Bathsheba was Solomon's mother, not his lover; however, Solomon is said to have married the Queen of Sheba.

== Chart performance ==
"Let Me Tell You About Love" debuted on the U.S. Billboard Hot Country Singles & Tracks for the week of July 8, 1989.

Chart (1989)	Peak position
Canada Country Singles (RPM)	1
US Hot Country Songs (Billboard)	1

=== Year-end charts ===
Chart (1989)	Position
Canada Country Tracks (RPM)	12
US Country Songs (Billboard)	8
