= Born to Be Blue (The Judds song) =

Single by The Judds

from the album Love Can Build a Bridge
- B-side: "Rompin' Stompin' Blues"
- Released: August 6, 1990
- Genre: Country
- Length: 4:50
- Label: RCA/Curb
- Songwriters: Mike Reid, Brent Maher, Mack David
- Producer: Brent Maher

The Judds singles chronology
"Guardian Angels" (1990)	"Born to Be Blue" (1990)	"Love Can Build a Bridge" (1991)

"Born to Be Blue" is a song written by Mike Reid, Brent Maher and Mack David, and recorded by American country music duo The Judds. It was released in August 1990 as the first single from the album Love Can Build a Bridge. The song reached number 5 on the Billboard Hot Country Singles & Tracks chart.

== Content ==
Norman Rowe of the Richmond Times Dispatch wrote of the song that "With the first 60 seconds of 'Born to Be Blue,' old-time jazz fans just might wonder if the Judds have abandoned Nashville and taken up residence in old New Orleans." Jim Abbott of the Orlando Sun Sentinel wrote that Wynonna Judd has an "ornery, straining-at-the-leash growl lends a certain authenticity to "Born to Be Blue," rescuing it from a musical arrangement that's a little too wholesome."

== Chart performance ==
"Born to Be Blue" debuted on the U.S. Billboard Hot Country Singles & Tracks for the week of August 11, 1990.

Chart (1990)	Peak position
Canada Country Singles (RPM)	4
US Hot Country Songs (Billboard)	5

=== Year-end charts ===
Chart (1990)	Position
Canada Country Tracks (RPM)	67
