= Guardian Angels (The Judds song) =

Single by The Judds

from the album River of Time
- B-side: "Cadillac Red"
- Released: March 31, 1990
- Genre: Country
- Length: 3:34
- Label: RCA/Curb
- Songwriters: Naomi Judd, John Barlow Jarvis, Don Schlitz
- Producer: Brent Maher

The Judds singles chronology
"One Man Woman" (1989)	"Guardian Angels" (1990)	"Born to Be Blue" (1990)

"Guardian Angels" is a song written Naomi Judd, John Barlow Jarvis and Don Schlitz, and recorded by American country music duo The Judds. It was released in March 1990 as the fourth single from the album River of Time. The song reached #16 on the Billboard Hot Country Singles & Tracks chart.

== Chart performance ==
Chart (1990)	Peak position
Canada Country Singles (RPM)	16
US Hot Country Songs (Billboard)	16
