= Had a Dream (For the Heart) =

Single by The Judds

from the album Wynonna & Naomi
- B-side: "Don't You Hear Jerusalem Moan"
- Released: December 17, 1983
- Studio: Creative Workshop (Berry Hill, Tennessee)
- Genre: Country
- Length: 3:10
- Label: RCA /Curb
- Songwriter(s): Dennis Linde
- Producer(s): Brent Maher

The Judds singles chronology
"Had a Dream (For the Heart)" (1983)	"Mama He's Crazy" (1984)

"Had a Dream (For the Heart)" is a song written by Dennis Linde. It was originally recorded by Teresa Brewer as "For the Heart" on her 1975 album, Unliberated Woman, and then covered by Elvis Presley, also as "For the Heart", on his 1976 album From Elvis Presley Boulevard, Memphis, Tennessee, which was recorded live at Graceland, the home of Elvis Presley and the second most visited home in the US. Presley's version, the A-side from the album with "Hurt" as the B-side, peaked at number 45 on the Hot Country Songs charts that year.

The Judds covered the song and released it as their debut single in December 1983, from their debut EP, Wynonna & Naomi. The song reached number 17 on the same chart.

== Chart performance ==
=== Elvis Presley ===
Chart (1976)	Peak position
US Hot Country Songs (Billboard)	45

=== The Judds ===
Chart (1983–1984)	Peak position
US Hot Country Songs (Billboard)	17
Canadian RPM Country Tracks	15
