= Young Love (Strong Love) =

Single by The Judds

from the album River of Time
- B-side: "Cow Cow Boogie"
- Released: February 20, 1989
- Recorded: 1988
- Genre: Country
- Length: 4:27
- Label: RCA/Curb
- Songwriters: Paul Kennerley; Kent Robbins
- Producer: Brent Maher

The Judds singles chronology
| "Change of Heart" (1988) | "Young Love (Strong Love)" (1989) | "Let Me Tell You About Love" (1989) |

"Young Love (Strong Love)" is a song written by Kent Robbins and Paul Kennerley, and recorded by American country music duo The Judds. It was released in February 1989, as the first single from their album River of Time. In May, it became The Judds' 13th No. 1 hit on the Billboard magazine Hot Country Singles chart.

== Content ==
The song chronicles a relationship between a young couple, beginning from the first time a young woman lays eyes on a man; according to the lyrics, she was "sitting cross-legged on the hood of a Ford, filing down her nails with an emery board." As the song continues, the boy—whose name is Billy—and girl — never named in the song — meet and the relationship blossoms into love. Eventually, the two are married, have a baby and move into a house on the edge of town.

== Chart positions ==
"Young Love" debuted on the U.S. Billboard Hot Country Singles & Tracks for the week of February 25, 1989.

| Chart (1989) | Peak position |
|---|---|
| Canada Country Singles (RPM) | 1 |
| US Hot Country Songs (Billboard) | 1 |

=== Year-end charts ===
| Chart (1989) | Position |
|---|---|
| Canada Country Tracks (RPM) | 29 |
| US Country Songs (Billboard) | 48 |
