= Why Not Me (The Judds song) =

Single by The Judds

from the album Why Not Me
- B-side: "Lazy Country Evening"
- Released: September 21, 1984
- Studio: Creative Workshop (Berry Hill, Tennessee)
- Genre: Country
- Length: 3:29
- Label: RCA/Curb
- Songwriter(s): Harlan Howard; Sonny Throckmorton; Brent Maher
- Producer(s): Brent Maher

The Judds singles chronology
"Mama He's Crazy" (1984)	"Why Not Me" (1984)	"Girls Night Out" (1985)

"Why Not Me" is a song written by Harlan Howard, Sonny Throckmorton and Brent Maher, and recorded by American country music duo The Judds. It was released in September 1984 as the first single and title track from the album of the same name. The song was their second number one on the country chart. The song spent a total of fifteen weeks at the top of the country singles chart, peaking at number one for two weeks.

== Critical reception ==
In 2024, Rolling Stone ranked the song at #84 on its 200 Greatest Country Songs of All Time ranking.

== Cover versions ==
- In 2007, Jill Johnson covered the song on the Music Row album.
- In 2015, Emily Ann Roberts, covered "Why Not Me" on The Voice U.S. season 9, charting to Number 10 in the iTunes charts

== Chart performance ==
Chart (1984–1985)	Peak position
US Hot Country Songs (Billboard)	1
Canadian RPM Country Tracks	3
Belgium (Ultratop 50 Flanders)	24
Netherlands (Single Top 100)	11

Chart (2022)	Peak position
US Digital Song Sales (Billboard)	21

== Certifications ==
Region	Certification	Certified units/sales
United States (RIAA)	Gold	500,000^{‡}
^{‡} Sales+streaming figures based on certification alone.
