= Kenny O'Dell =

American singer-songwriter (1944–2018)

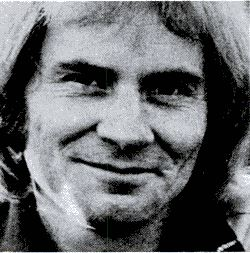

Background information
- Birth name: Kenneth Guy Gist Jr.
- Born: June 21, 1944; Antlers, Oklahoma, U.S.
- Died: March 27, 2018 (aged 73); Cool Springs, Tennessee, U.S.
- Genres: Country
- Occupation: Singer-songwriter
- Instrument: Guitar
- Years active: 1962–1979
- Labels: Vegas, Capricorn

Kenneth Guy Gist Jr. (June 21, 1944 – March 27, 2018), known as Kenny O'Dell, was an American country music singer and songwriter, best known for writing the number-one country hits "Behind Closed Doors" (recorded by Charlie Rich, 1973) and "Mama He's Crazy" (The Judds, 1984). O'Dell was inducted into the Nashville Songwriters Hall of Fame.

== Career ==
Early in his career, he worked with guitarist Duane Eddy, and his own band, Guys and Dolls. When O'Dell first moved to Nashville in 1969, he ran Bobby Goldsboro's publishing company.

He also wrote pop and soft rock songs, including "Next Plane to London", which was a Top 20 hit in 1967 for The Rose Garden. The Crickets recorded two of his songs in 1972 and 1973, namely "My Rockin' Days" and "Rock'n'Roll Man". Charlie Rich had a top 10 country hit in 1972 with the O'Dell song, "I Take It On Home". It was followed by "Behind Closed Doors", which won a Grammy Award in 1973 for Best Country & Western Recording. O'Dell wrote or co-wrote the number-one country hits "Trouble in Paradise" (Loretta Lynn, 1974) and "Lizzie and the Rainman" (Tanya Tucker, 1975). His other top-10 hit was "What I've Got in Mind" (Billie Jo Spears, 1976).

As a performer, O'Dell had a top-40 pop hit with "Beautiful People", released in 1967. He later had five top-40 country hits, topped by the top-10 hit "Let's Shake Hands And Come Out Lovin'" in 1978. The follow-up, "As Long As I Can Wake Up In Your Arms" peaked at No. 12 in 1979.

== Personal life and death ==
O'Dell's wife, guitarist Vivian J. "Corki" Ray (née Casey) Gist died at the age of 80 in 2017. The couple had three children.

O'Dell died of natural causes on March 27, 2018, in Cool Springs, Tennessee. He was 73.

== Discography ==
=== Albums ===
Year	Album	Label
1968	Beautiful People	Vegas
1974	Kenny O'Dell	Capricorn
1978	Let's Shake Hands and Come Out Lovin'	Capricorn

=== Singles ===
Year	Single	Chart Positions			Album
Year	Single	US Country	US	CAN Country	Album
1962	"Old Time Love"	—	—	—	single only
1967	"Beautiful People"	—	38	—	Beautiful People
1968	"Springfield Plane"	—	94	—	singles only
1968	"Happy with You"	—	118	—	singles only
1968	"Bless Your Little Heart"	—	—	—	singles only
1970	"If I Was a Rambler"	—	—	—	singles only
1971	"Jubal"	—	—	—	singles only
1972	"Why Don't We Go Somewhere and Love"	—	—	—	singles only
1972	"Lizzie and the Rainman"	—	—	—	singles only
1973	"Rock and Roll Man"	—	—	—	singles only
1974	"You Bet Your Sweet, Sweet Love"	58	—	—	Kenny O'Dell
1974	"I'll Find Another Way (To Say I Love You)"	—	—	—	Kenny O'Dell
1975	"Soulful Woman"	18	—	36	Kenny O'Dell
1975	"My Honky Tonk Ways"	37	105	—	singles only
1975	"I Can't Think When You're Doin'"	—	—	—	singles only
1978	"Let's Shake Hands and Come Out Lovin'"	9	—	—	Let's Shake Hands and Come Out Lovin'
1978	"As Long as I Can Wake Up in Your Arms"	12	—	14	Let's Shake Hands and Come Out Lovin'
1979	"Medicine Woman"	32	—	—	single only

== Awards ==
- 1973—Grammy\Best Country Song\"Behind Closed Doors"
- 1973—CMA\Song of the Year\"Behind Closed Doors"
- 1973—CMA\Single of the Year\"Behind Closed Doors"
- 1973—ACM\Song of the Year\"Behind Closed Doors"
- 1973—ACM\Single of the Year\"Behind Closed Doors"
- 1984—Nashville Songwriters Association International\Songwriter of the Year
- 1984—NSAI\Song of the Year\"Mama He's Crazy"
- 1985—BMI\Country Song of the Year\"Mama He's Crazy"
