= Love Can Build a Bridge =

1990 single by The Judds

Single by the Judds

from the album Love Can Build a Bridge
- B-side: "This Country's Rockin'"
- Released: December 3, 1990
- Genre: Country
- Length: 5:23 (album version); 3:52 (single version)
- Label: RCA; Curb
- Songwriters: John Barlow Jarvis; Naomi Judd; Paul Overstreet
- Producer: Brent Maher

The Judds singles chronology
"Born to Be Blue" (1990)	"Love Can Build a Bridge" (1990)	"One Hundred and Two" (1991)

"Love Can Build a Bridge" is a song written by Naomi Judd, Paul Overstreet, and John Barlow Jarvis, and recorded by American country music duo the Judds. It was released in 1990 as the second single and title track from their album of the same name. It was a top-five country hit in mid-1991. The song has inspired several cover versions, including one by Cher, Chrissie Hynde, Neneh Cherry, and Eric Clapton that topped the UK Singles Chart in 1995.

== Content and composition ==
The song is about the importance of always standing together, and was co-written by Naomi Judd and dedicated to the Judd family and fans as almost a goodbye, as at the time, Naomi was chronically ill with Hepatitis C and was forced to retire as it had been speculated that she had only three years left to live. "Love Can Build a Bridge" is performed in the key of B major with a tempo of 66 beats per minute in common time. The vocals span from E_{3} to D_{5}.

== Charts ==
=== Weekly charts ===
Chart (1990–1991)	Peak position
Canada Country Singles (RPM)	6
US Hot Country Songs (Billboard)	5

Chart (2022)	Peak position
Canada Digital Song Sales (Billboard)	20
US Digital Song Sales (Billboard)	8

=== Year-end charts ===
Chart (1991)	Position
Canada Country Tracks (RPM)	65
US Country Songs (Billboard)	51

== Comic Relief version ==
"Love Can Build a Bridge"

Single by Cher, Chrissie Hynde and Neneh Cherry with Eric Clapton
- Released: March 6, 1995
- Length: 4:16
- Label: London
- Songwriters: John Barlow Jarvis; Naomi Judd; Paul Overstreet
- Producer: Peter Asher

Cher singles chronology
"I Got You Babe" (1993)	"Love Can Build a Bridge" (1995)	"Walking in Memphis" (1995)

Chrissie Hynde singles chronology
"Spiritual High (State of Independence)" (1992)	"Love Can Build a Bridge" (1995)	"Straight Ahead" (2004)

Neneh Cherry singles chronology
"7 Seconds" (1994)	"Love Can Build a Bridge" (1995)	"Woman" (1996)

Eric Clapton singles chronology
"Motherless Child" (1994)	"Love Can Build a Bridge" (1995)	"Change the World" (1996)

A new version of "Love Can Build a Bridge" recorded by American singers Cher and Chrissie Hynde, Swedish singer Neneh Cherry, and British singer-guitarist Eric Clapton was released as 1995's official Comic Relief single. This version, released by London Records, topped the UK Singles Chart for one week in March 1995; it was Cher's second solo UK number-one hit, Hynde's first UK number one outside the Pretenders, and the only UK number-one single for both Cherry and Clapton.

=== Critical reception ===
John Robinson from NME commented, "Interesting architectural advice here from that well-known construction firm Cher, Hynde, Cherry and Clapton. This, as such an unlikely combination of talents may have already suggested, is this year's Comic Relief record – and bloody shocking it is too."

=== Charts ===
==== Weekly charts ====
Chart (1995)	Peak position
Austria (Ö3 Austria Top 40)	18
Europe (European Hot 100)	7
Europe (European Hit Radio)	12
Finland (IFPI)	15
Germany (GfK)	62
Ireland (IRMA)	5
Israel (IBA)	25
Netherlands (Dutch Top 40 Tipparade)	4
Netherlands (Single Top 100)	41
Scottish Singles Sales (Official Charts)	1
Switzerland (Schweizer Hitparade)	21
UK Singles (Official Charts)	1

==== Year-end charts ====
Chart (1995)	Position
Latvia (Latvijas Top 50)	182
UK Singles (OCC)	43

=== Certifications and sales ===
Region	Certification	Certified units/sales
United Kingdom (BPI)	Silver	200,000^{^}
^{^} Shipments figures based on certification alone.

== Other cover versions ==
The song was covered by Children for Rwanda as a charity single in aid of Save the Children. This version was released on August 30, 1994, and reached number 57 on the UK Singles Chart the following month. In 1992, at the age of 10, Britney Spears performed a cover of the song on the US television show Star Search.
