= Cry Myself to Sleep =

Song written by Paul Kennerley

Single by The Judds

from the album Rockin' with the Rhythm
- B-side: "Dream Chaser"
- Released: September 1986
- Studio: Creative Workshop (Berry Hill, Tennessee)
- Genre: Country
- Length: 3:44
- Label: RCA/Curb
- Songwriter(s): Paul Kennerley
- Producer(s): Brent Maher

The Judds singles chronology
"Rockin' with the Rhythm of the Rain" (1986)	"Cry Myself to Sleep" (1986)	"Don't Be Cruel" (1987)

"Cry Myself to Sleep" is a song written by Paul Kennerley, and recorded by American country music duo The Judds. It was released in September 1986 as the fourth single from the album Rockin' with the Rhythm. The song was their eighth number one country hit. The single went to number one for one week and spent a total of sixteen weeks on the country chart.

The song was also recorded by Steve Earle and released in 1984 as the B-side to the "What'll You Do About Me" single. It also appears on his Early Tracks album.

== Charts ==
=== Weekly charts ===
Chart (1986–1987)	Peak position
US Hot Country Songs (Billboard)	1
Canadian RPM Country Tracks	2

=== Year-end charts ===
Chart (1987)	Position
US Hot Country Songs (Billboard)	6
