= Mama He's Crazy =

Song written by Kenny O'Dell

- Single

Single by The Judds

from the EP Wynonna & Naomi
- B-side: "Down Home"
- Released: April 1984
- Studio: Creative Workshop (Berry Hill, Tennessee)
- Genre: Country
- Length: 3:14
- Label: RCA/Curb
- Songwriter: Kenny O'Dell
- Producer: Brent Maher

The Judds singles chronology
"Had a Dream (For the Heart)" (1983)	"Mama He's Crazy" (1984)	"Why Not Me" (1984)

"Mama He's Crazy" is a song written by Kenny O'Dell, and originally recorded by American country music duo The Judds. It was released in April 1984 as the second single from their debut January 1984 EP Wynonna & Naomi. The song was re-released on their full-length 1984 debut album Why Not Me. The song was their second hit and the first of 14 number one singles. The single went to number one for one week and spent a total of 14 weeks on the country chart. It was only the second country number one sung by a female duo; previously only The Davis Sisters featuring Skeeter Davis had made it to number one on the country chart in 1953 with their song "I Forgot More Than You'll Ever Know".

== Cover versions ==
- In 1984, Pinkard & Bowden released a parody of the song titled "Mama She's Lazy". This parody went to number 39 on the country music charts.
- In 2007, Jill Johnson covered the song on Music Row.

== Charts ==
=== Weekly charts ===
Chart (1984)	Peak position
US Hot Country Songs (Billboard)	1
Canadian RPM Country Tracks	1

Chart (2022)	Peak position
Canada Digital Song Sales (Billboard)	50
US Digital Song Sales (Billboard)	28

=== Year-end charts ===
Chart (1984)	Position
US Hot Country Songs (Billboard)	3

== Certifications ==
Region	Certification	Certified units/sales
United States (RIAA)	Gold	500,000^{‡}
^{‡} Sales+streaming figures based on certification alone.
