= Have Mercy (The Judds song) =

Single by The Judds

from the album Rockin' with the Rhythm
- B-side: "Bye Bye Baby Blues"
- Released: September 1985
- Studio: Creative Workshop (Berry Hill, Tennessee)
- Genre: Country
- Length: 3:23
- Label: RCA/Curb
- Songwriter: Paul Kennerley
- Producer: Brent Maher

The Judds singles chronology
"Love Is Alive" (1985)	"Have Mercy" (1985)	"Grandpa (Tell Me 'Bout the Good Old Days)" (1986)

Music video
- "Have Mercy" on YouTube

"Have Mercy" is a song written by Paul Kennerley, and recorded by American country music duo The Judds. It was released in September 1985 as the first single from the album Rockin' with the Rhythm. This marked their fifth time reaching the top spot on the country charts. The single topped the chart for two weeks and remained on the country chart for a total of fourteen weeks.

== Chart performance ==
Chart (1985–1986)	Peak position
US Hot Country Songs (Billboard)	1
Canadian RPM Country Tracks	2
