= The Judds =

American country music duo

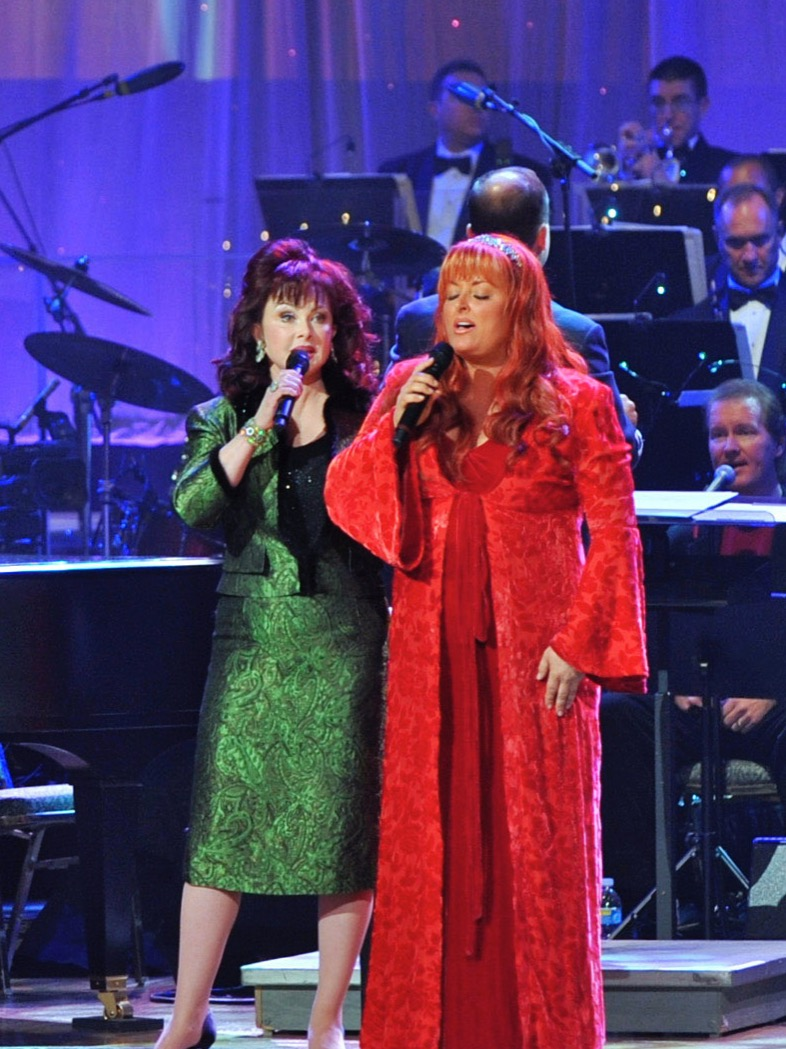
- Naomi (left) and Wynonna (right) performing in 2008

Background information
- Also known as: Wynonna & Naomi (The Judds)
- Origin: Ashland, Kentucky, U.S.
- Genre: Country
- Years active: 1979–1991; 1994; 1998–2000; 2008–2011; 2015; 2017; 2022–2023
- Label: RCA Records/Curb
- Past members: Naomi Judd; Wynonna Judd
- Website: www.thejudds.com

The Judds were an American country music duo composed of lead vocalist-guitarist Wynonna Judd and her mother Naomi Judd on backup vocals. The duo signed to RCA Records in 1983 and released six studio albums between then and 1991. The Judds were one of the most successful acts in country music history, winning five Grammy Awards for Best Country Performance by a Duo or Group with Vocal, and nine Country Music Association awards. They also charted more than twenty singles on the Billboard Hot Country Songs charts, including fourteen that went to number one. After eight years as a duo, the Judds disbanded in 1991 after Naomi was diagnosed with hepatitis C. Wynonna began a highly successful solo career soon after, although she and her mother reunited on multiple occasions.

After the duo's last performance at the CMT Music Awards in April, Naomi Judd died by suicide on April 30, 2022, before she and Wynonna were inducted into the Country Music Hall of Fame.

== Early life and career ==
Naomi Judd was born Diana Ellen Judd on January 11, 1946, in Ashland, Kentucky. Growing up, she played piano at her local church. At age 18, she married Michael Ciminella and gave birth to her daughter Christina Ciminella, who would later change her name to Wynonna Judd; though Ciminella was regarded as Wynonna's father, in truth, Naomi had conceived Wynonna out of wedlock with an ex-boyfriend named Charles Jordan. After Diana's parents divorced, she and her daughter moved to Los Angeles in 1968, and lived on welfare after she and Michael divorced in 1972. By 1979, Diana and her daughter moved to Tennessee. Diana renamed herself Naomi and began playing music with her daughter, who sang lead and played guitar. At the same time, Naomi began studying to be a nurse.

Naomi was a promoter of the act and was reportedly propositioned, sexually harassed, and dismissed when she tried to do so. She submitted a cassette tape produced for $30 to Nashville music producers and to anyone who would listen. In 1983, Naomi met the daughter of record producer Brent Maher, who was able to secure the Judds an audition with executives of RCA Records. These executives signed the duo immediately upon hearing their audition.

== Musical career ==
The Judds' first release for RCA/Curb was an extended play titled Wynonna & Naomi. The release consisted of six songs, two of which were issued as singles to promote it. First was "Had a Dream (For the Heart)", a song written by Dennis Linde and originally cut by Elvis Presley as the B-side to his 1976 single "Hurt". The Judds' rendition was their first entry on the Hot Country Songs charts, where it peaked at No. 17. Next was "Mama He's Crazy", written by Kenny O'Dell. In mid-1984, this song became the first of eight consecutive No. 1 singles for the duo on the country music charts, while also earning the duo its first Grammy Award for Best Country Performance by a Duo or Group with Vocal the following year.

The Judds' first full-length studio album, Why Not Me, was issued in 1984. Steve Huey of Allmusic wrote that the album "took its place as a classic of modern country, establishing the Judds as spokeswomen for a new generation of female country music fans." Three singles were issued from it: the title track, which earned a second Grammy Award for Best Country Performance by a Duo or Group with Vocal, followed by "Girls Night Out" and "Love Is Alive". The album went on to sell a million copies in the United States.

Rockin' with the Rhythm (1985) accounted for four more singles. First was "Have Mercy", which held the No. 1 position on Hot Country Songs for two weeks, making it their only song to hold that position for more than a single week. "Grandpa (Tell Me 'Bout the Good Ol' Days)" came next. Released in February 1985, the song won both a third Grammy Award for Best Country Performance by a Duo or Group with Vocal, along with Grammy Award for Best Country Song, both awarded in 1987. Following these were "Rockin' with the Rhythm of the Rain" and "Cry Myself to Sleep".

1987's Heartland was led off by another Elvis Presley cover, specifically "Don't Be Cruel", featuring backing vocals from The Jordanaires. Huey described this album as more "uneven" than its predecessors. "I Know Where I'm Going", "Maybe Your Baby's Got the Blues", and "Turn It Loose" were also released from this compilation, followed in 1988 by two tracks off their Greatest Hits package: "Give a Little Love" and "Change of Heart" (written by Naomi), the latter of which accounted for their fourth Grammy Award for Best Country Performance by a Duo or Group with Vocal.

=== 1988 until disbanding ===
River of Time, issued in 1989, became their first disc not to reach the summit of the Top Country Albums charts. Despite its lower sales, it accounted for their last No 1 hits "Young Love (Strong Love)" and "Let Me Tell You About Love", the latter of which featured Carl Perkins on lead guitar. The later singles were less successful, with "Guardian Angels" becoming their first single since "Had a Dream" not to make the Top 10 of the country charts.

Huey noted that at this point in the Judds' career, the personalities of Wynonna and Naomi began to differ. According to Allmusic: "Naomi was the extroverted stage presence, the sometime songwriter, the ambitious businesswoman who steered the group's career and pushed her daughter to keep realizing her talent. Wynonna--despite her quiet, reserved demeanor--was a prodigiously talented vocal stylist who grew more sure of herself with every passing release and rebelled more and more forcefully against her mother's direction." Amid speculation that the two would disband, they released their last full studio album, Love Can Build a Bridge, in 1990. From it came "Born to Be Blue" and the title track, written by Naomi along with Paul Overstreet and John Barlow Jarvis. "Love Can Build a Bridge" was also their last single to receive Grammy Awards, once again for Country Song and Best Vocal Performance by a Duo or Group with Vocal. This album was promoted by a farewell tour. Ending the original segment of their career was Greatest Hits Volume Two (1991). It also accounted for the single "John Deere Tractor", originally found on Wynonna & Naomi.

The Judds decided to say goodbye to their fans with a Farewell Tour in 1991, culminating in a date on Dec. 4 at the Murphy Center in Murfreesboro, Tenn., that was filmed for a TV special titled The Judds: Their Final Concert. The special performance includes appearances from Carl Perkins, Reba McEntire, and Larry Gatlin, and it features an emotional moment in which Naomi urges Wynonna, who had already announced her intention to launch a solo career, to "go toward the light" as she takes her own path forward.

Following their disbanding, Wynonna Judd signed to MCA Records and Curb Records between 1992 and 1997, followed by just Curb from then onward. She charted over 25 singles on her own, including four that went to No. 1 on the Hot Country Songs charts. These included her first three releases, "She Is His Only Need", "I Saw the Light", and "No One Else on Earth" all in 1992, along with "To Be Loved by You" in 1996.

== Reunion shows ==
Wynonna and Naomi briefly reunited for a performance at the Super Bowl XXVIII halftime show. They reunited again in a commercial for the retail chain Kmart, performing the song "Changing for the Better". The duo also performed several shows in 1998. During this time, the duo also charted one more single credited to The Judds, as well as receiving an Academy of Country Music nomination for Duo of the Year in 2001. In addition, Naomi sang harmony on Wynonna's 2004 single "Flies on the Butter (You Can't Go Home Again)", although this song was credited as "Wynonna with Naomi Judd".

The duo reunited for a one-off performance on New Year's Eve, December 31, 1999, in Phoenix, AZ with Wynonna's half-sister Ashley Judd. The 23 song set was released as The Judds Reunion Live and features Naomi's husband, Larry Strickland producing.

In 2008, the Judds once again reunited for a concert at the 2008 Stagecoach Festival in Indio, California, as well as two shows in Canada, including one at the world-famous Calgary Stampede and another at the Merritt Mountain Music Festival in Merritt, British Columbia. In 2009, the Judds performed at the CMA Music Festival in Nashville.

In February 2010, Wynonna Judd appeared on CBS's The Early Show and announced that she would reunite with Naomi, to tour and record a studio album for the final time as the Judds by the end of 2010. The tour, known as the Last Encore Tour, became an 18-city tour of the US that was expanded to 29 dates in 2011.

On September 14, 2010, the Judds appeared on The Oprah Winfrey Show where Wynonna discussed "her recent weight loss, her year of living dangerously and what it's like going back on stage as part of the iconic duo, the Judds." The Judds also performed their new single "I Will Stand by You," which was released on iTunes that same day. In March 2011, Curb Records announced the release of the Judds' new album, I Will Stand by You: The Essential Collection, which features two new songs and twelve of the duo's hits. The album was released on April 5, 2011.

In April 2011, the Judds began starring in their first reality series, The Judds, on OWN: Oprah Winfrey Network. The new series, which premiered April 10, follows the duo on their final concert tour and explores their mother-daughter relationship.

In October 2017, the Judds reunited in order to appear at the "All in for the Gambler" concert, the final Nashville concert by Kenny Rogers which took place at the Bridgestone Arena and featured performances by many of Rogers' friends. Wynonna sang "You Turn The Light On" before Naomi joined her to perform "Back to the Well".

Wynonna and Naomi Judd reunited for what would be their final performance together at the 2022 CMT Music Awards. They performed "Love Can Build a Bridge", from the Country Music Hall of Fame in Nashville. Kacey Musgraves introduced the performance. The performance marked the Judds' first nationally televised award show performance in more than twenty years.

On April 11, 2022, the Judds' "The Final Tour" was announced with special guest Martina McBride, making 10 stops beginning on September 30. However, Naomi died from a self-inflicted gunshot wound on April 30, 2022, five months before the tour was scheduled to begin. Honoring Wynonna and Ashley Judd's wishes for the medallion ceremony to continue in spite of their grief, the Judds were inducted into the Country Music Hall of Fame the day following Naomi's death. Despite Naomi's death, Wynonna announced that she would continue to tour under the name The Judds in late 2022 with Martina McBride, Kelsea Ballerini, Ashley McBryde, Faith Hill, Brandi Carlile, Little Big Town, and Trisha Yearwood. The tour was chronicled in the documentary Wynonna Judd: Between Heaven and Hell, which was released on April 26, 2023.

The album A Tribute to The Judds was released on October 27, 2023.

== Discography ==
Studio albums

- Why Not Me (1984)
- Rockin' with the Rhythm (1985)
- Heartland (1987)
- Christmas Time with the Judds (1987)
- River of Time (1989)
- Love Can Build a Bridge (1990)

Extended plays

- Wynonna & Naomi (1984)
- Big Bang Boogie (2000)

== Awards and honors ==
=== Academy of Country Music ===
- 1984 Top Vocal Duo
- 1984 Song of the Year - "Why Not Me"
- 1985 Top Vocal Duo
- 1986 Top Vocal Duo
- 1987 Top Vocal Duo
- 1988 Top Vocal Duo
- 1989 Top Vocal Duo
- 1990 Top Vocal Duo
- 2013 Cliffie Stone Pioneer Award

=== Country Music Association ===
- 1984 Horizon Award
- 1985 Single of the Year - "Why Not Me"
- 1985 Vocal Group of the Year
- 1986 Vocal Group of the Year
- 1987 Vocal Group of the Year
- 1988 Vocal Duo of the Year
- 1989 Vocal Duo of the Year
- 1990 Vocal Duo of the Year
- 1991 Vocal Duo of the Year

=== Grammy Awards ===
- 1985 Best Country Performance by a Duo or Group with Vocal - "Mama He's Crazy"
- 1986 Best Country Performance by a Duo or Group with Vocal - "Why Not Me"
- 1987 Best Country Performance by a Duo or Group with Vocal - "Grandpa (Tell Me 'Bout the Good Old Days)"
- 1989 Best Country Performance by a Duo or Group with Vocal - "Give A Little Love"
- 1992 Best Country Performance by a Duo or Group with Vocal - "Love Can Build A Bridge"

=== Country Music Hall of Fame ===
- Inducted 2022.
