= Love Is Alive (The Judds song) =

Single by The Judds

from the album Why Not Me
- B-side: "Mr. Pain"
- Released: May 1985
- Studio: Creative Workshop (Berry Hill, Tennessee)
- Genre: Country
- Length: 3:54
- Label: RCA/Curb
- Songwriter: Kent Robbins
- Producer: Brent Maher

The Judds singles chronology
"Girls Night Out" (1984)	"Love Is Alive" (1985)	"Have Mercy" (1985)

"Love Is Alive" is a song written by Kent Robbins and recorded by American country music duo The Judds. It was released in May 1985 as the third single from the album Why Not Me. The song was The Judds' fourth number-one country hit. The single spent one week at number one and spent a total of 14 weeks on the chart.

== Charts ==
=== Weekly charts ===
Chart (1985)	Peak position
US Hot Country Songs (Billboard)	1
Canadian RPM Country Tracks	1

=== Year-end charts ===
Chart (1985)	Position
US Hot Country Songs (Billboard)	15
