= Kent Robbins =

American songwriter

Kent M. Robbins
- Born: Kent Marshall Robbins; April 23, 1947
- Origin: Mayfield, Kentucky, United States
- Died: December 27, 1997 (aged 50) Chilton County, Alabama
- Genres: Country
- Occupation: Songwriter
- Years active: 1974–1997

Kent Marshall Robbins (April 23, 1947 – December 27, 1997) was an American country music songwriter.

Robbins was born in Mayfield, Kentucky. He began writing for Charley Pride's Pi-Gem music in 1974. Between then and his death, he wrote songs for several other country music artists. Among his compositions was "Love Is Alive" by The Judds, for which he received a Grammy Award nomination in 1985. Robbins also founded a publishing company in 1981 with songwriter Buzz Cason.

Robbins died in an automobile accident outside Clanton, Alabama in 1997. One year after his death, he was inducted into the Nashville Songwriters Hall of Fame.

== Songwriting credits ==
Songs written or co-written by Robbins:

- Barbara Mandrell – "The Beginning Of The End", "We Are the One"
- Trace Adkins – "Every Light in the House"
- Gary Allan – "Her Man", "It Would Be You", "I'll Take Today"
- John Anderson – "She Just Started Liking Cheatin' Songs", "Straight Tequila Night", "I Wish I Could Have Been There"
- Janie Fricke – "Easy to Please"
- Michael Johnson – "Gotta Learn to Love Without You"
- The Judds – "Love Is Alive", "Young Love (Strong Love)", "Mr. Pain"
- Kathy Mattea – "Maybe She's Human"
- Ronnie Milsap – "(I'm A) Stand by My Woman Man"
- Willie Nelson – "Spirit"
- Charley Pride – "When I Stop Leavin' (I'll Be Gone)", "You're My Jamaica", "I Don't Think She's in Love Anymore"
- George Strait – "Write This Down"
- Tanya Tucker – "I'll Come Back as Another Woman"
- Steve Wariner – "Heart Trouble"
- Don Williams – "One Good Well"
- Trisha Yearwood – "I Wanna Go Too Far"
- Shania Twain - "God Ain't Gonna Getcha for That", "When He Leaves You"
