= Grandpa (Tell Me 'Bout the Good Old Days) =

Single by The Judds

from the album Rockin' with the Rhythm
- Released: January 1986
- Recorded: 1985
- Studio: Creative Workshop (Berry Hill, Tennessee)
- Genre: Country
- Length: 4:15
- Label: RCA/Curb
- Songwriter: Jamie O'Hara
- Producer: Brent Maher

The Judds singles chronology
"Have Mercy" (1985)	"Grandpa (Tell Me 'Bout the Good Old Days)" (1986)	"Rockin' with the Rhythm of the Rain" (1986)

"Grandpa (Tell Me 'Bout the Good Old Days)" is a song written by Jamie O'Hara, and recorded by the American country music duo, The Judds. It was released in January 1986 as the second single from the album Rockin' with the Rhythm. The song was their sixth No. 1 song on the Billboard magazine Hot Country Singles chart. Members of the Western Writers of America chose it as one of the Top 100 Western songs of all time.

== Content ==
"Grandpa" is a nostalgic country song in which the singer feels overwhelmed by the rapid changes of modern life ("It feels like this world's gone crazy") and wonders if things were really better in her grandfather's time. She asks him:

- if lovers really stayed together for life
- if people really always kept promises
- if families really prayed together
- if fathers really never abandoned their families

Poignantly, the song does not mention how her grandfather responds.

== Chart performance ==
Chart (1986)	Peak position
US Hot Country Songs (Billboard)	1
Canadian RPM Country Tracks	1

Chart (2022)	Peak position
Canada Digital Song Sales (Billboard)	31
US Digital Song Sales (Billboard)	10

Year End (1986)	Position
Billboard Top Country Singles	33
Canadian RPM Country Tracks	11

== Certifications ==
Region	Certification	Certified units/sales
New Zealand (RMNZ)	Gold	15,000^{‡}
United States (RIAA)	Platinum	1,000,000^{‡}
^{‡} Sales+streaming figures based on certification alone.

== Awards ==
The song won Grammy Awards for the Judds in the Country Duo/Vocal Group category and for O'Hara in the Country Songwriting Category for 1987.
