= Lacy J. Dalton discography =

Discography of American singer-songwriter, Lacy J. Dalton

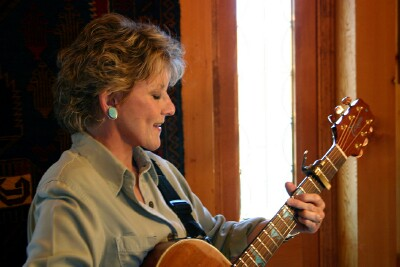
- Dalton in 2005
- Studio albums: 17
- EPs: 1
- Live albums: 1
- Compilation albums: 10
- Singles: 48
- Music videos: 3
- Other charted songs: 1

The discography of American singer-songwriter, Lacy J. Dalton, containes 17 studio albums, ten compilation albums, one live album, one extended play (EP), 48 singles, 1 other charted song and three music videos. Dalton's debut studio album and single were both billed under the name, Jill Croston. Under Columbia Records, her debut single titled "Crazy Blue Eyes" was issued in 1979 and reached the top-20 on the US Hot Country Songs chart. It was followed by a second US top-20 country song titled "Tennessee Waltz". Both were included on her Columbia studio album of the same name, which peaked at number 11 on the US Top Country Albums chart. It was followed by her third studio album, Hard Times, which was released in September 1980. The product produced three top-20 US Hot Country Songs singles: the title track, "Hillbilly Girl with the Blues" and "Whisper". In 1981, Takin' It Easy rose to number 12 on the Top Country Albums chart and spawned the top-10 US and Canadian country song of the same name.

In 1982, Dalton's fifth studio album, 16th Avenue, produced a top-10 US country song of the same title. Her sixth studio product, Dream Baby (1983), featured her seventh (and final) top-10 US country song which also had the same title as the album. Her seventh studio product was released two years later and titled Can't Run Away from Your Heart. Of its four singles, only two made the US and Canadian country song charts, including "If That Ain't Love". Her final Columbia studio album was issued in 1986 titled Highway Diner and featured the Hot Country Songs top-20 song, "Working Class Man". In 1989, Universal issued Dalton's ninth album called Survivor, which rose to number 33 on the Top Country Albums chart. Its lead single, "The Heart", reached number 13 on the Hot Country Songs list. Her 1990 single, "Black Coffee", reached the US and Canadian country top-20 and was included on tenth album, Lacy J.

Between 1991 and 1992, Liberty Records released Dalton's next studio album albums: Crazy Love and Chains on the Wind. The albums spawned four singles, including "Bye Bye Love", a duet with Eddie Rabbitt that is her final charting song to date, reaching number 69 on the Canadian country list. A live album was released by the Relix label in 1997 and was titled Gilley's Unreleased Performance of Lacy J. Dalton. Her next studio album was not released until 1999 and was titled Wild Horse Crossing. The Song Dog label issued Dalton's 2004 studio product titled The Last Wild Place. Dalton began releasing a series of singles in 2006, starting with "Heart of Hearts". Other titles include "We Are Rotary" (2011), "Next to Me" (2013), "I Can't Breathe" (2020), "Summerland" (2024) and "Common Ground" (2024). Her most recent studio album was released in 2024 and was titled For the Black Sheep.

== Albums ==
=== Studio albums ===
List of studio albums, with selected chart positions, and other relevant details
Title	Album details	Peak chart positions
Title	Album details	US Country
Jill Croston (also credited under the name Jill Croston)	Released: 1977; Label: Harbor; Formats: LP	—
Lacy J. Dalton	Released: February 1980; Label: Columbia; Formats: LP, cassette	11
Hard Times	Released: September 1980; Label: Columbia; Formats: LP, cassette	18
Takin' It Easy	Released: June 1981; Label: Columbia; Formats: LP, cassette	12
16th Avenue	Released: June 1982; Label: Columbia; Formats: LP	23
Dream Baby	Released: June 1983; Label: Columbia; Formats: LP, cassette	20
Can't Run Away from Your Heart	Released: May 1985; Label: Columbia; Formats: LP, cassette	33
Highway Diner	Released: July 1986; Label: Columbia; Formats: LP, cassette	32
Survivor	Released: January 1989; Label: Universal; Formats: LP, CD, cassette	31
Lacy J.	Released: April 1990; Label: Capitol; Formats: CD, cassette	26
Crazy Love	Released: April 1991; Label: Capitol; Formats: CD, cassette	—
Chains on the Wind	Released: April 1992; Label: Capitol; Formats: CD, cassette	—
Wild Horse Crossing	Released: 1999; Label: Shop-EZ; Formats: CD	—
The Last Wild Place	Released: October 2004; Label: Song Dog; Formats: CD	—
Here's to Hank	Released: November 2010; Label: BSW; Formats: CD	—
Can't Tell Your Heart Who to Beat For	Released: February 2, 2024; Label: Song Dog; Formats: Digital	—
For the Black Sheep	Released: August 9, 2024; Label: Song Dog; Formats: Digital	—
"—" denotes a recording that did not chart or was not released in that territory.

=== Compilation albums ===
List of compilation albums, with selected chart positions, and other relevant details
Title	Album details	Peak chart positions
Title	Album details	US Country
Greatest Hits	Released: October 1983; Label: Columbia; Formats: LP, cassette	63
I Love Country	Released: 1986; Label: CBS; Formats: LP	—
Blue Eyed Blues	Released: May 1987; Label: Columbia; Formats: LP	—
The Best of Lacy J. Dalton	Released: 1989; Label: CBS Special Products; Formats: CD, cassette	—
Somethin' Special	Released: February 1990; Label: CBS Special Products; Formats: CD, cassette	—
The Best of Lacy J. Dalton	Released: 1993; Label: Liberty; Formats: CD, cassette	—
Six Great Hits: Something Special	Released: 1997; Label: Sony; Formats: CD	—
Pure Country	Released: 1998; Label: Sony; Formats: CD	—
Anthology	Released: May 16, 2000; Label: Renaissance/Sony; Formats: CD	—
Country Classics	Released: May 29, 2001; Label: EMI; Formats: CD	—
"—" denotes a recording that did not chart or was not released in that territory.

=== Live albums ===
List of live albums, showing relevant details
Title	Album details
Gilley's Unreleased Performance of Lacy J. Dalton	Released: November 4, 1997; Label: Relix; Formats: CD

== Extended plays ==
List of extended plays (EP's), showing relevant details
Title	Album details
Scarecrow	Released: January 23, 2019; Label: Song Dog; Formats: Digital

== Singles ==
=== As lead artist ===
List of singles, with selected chart positions, showing other relevant details
Title	Year	Peak chart positions			Album
Title	Year	US Bub.	US Cou.	CAN Cou.	Album
"Nashville Lady Singer" (credited as Jill Croston)	1977	—	—	—	Jill Croston
"Crazy Blue Eyes"	1979	—	17	—	Lacy J. Dalton
"Tennessee Waltz"	1980	—	18	43	Lacy J. Dalton
"Losing Kind of Love"	1980	—	14	57	Lacy J. Dalton
"Hard Times"	1980	—	7	16	Hard Times
"Hillbilly Girl with the Blues"	1980	—	8	10	Hard Times
"Whisper"	1981	—	10	12	Hard Times
"Takin' It Easy"	1981	—	2	2	Takin' It Easy
"Everybody Makes Mistakes"	1981	—	5	28	Takin' It Easy
"Slow Down"	1982	5	13	—	16th Avenue
"16th Avenue"	1982	—	7	13	16th Avenue
"Dream Baby (How Long Must I Dream)"	1983	—	9	10	Dream Baby
"Windin' Down"	1983	—	54	—	Dream Baby
"If That Ain't Love"	1984	—	15	15	Can't Run Away from Your Heart
"You Can't Run Away from Your Heart"	1985	—	20	20	Can't Run Away from Your Heart
"The Night Has a Heart of Its Own"	1985	—	58	—	Can't Run Away from Your Heart
"Don't Fall in Love with Me"	1985	—	43	46	Can't Run Away from Your Heart
"Working Class Man"	1986	—	16	35	Highway Diner
"This Ol' Town"	1986	—	33	39	Highway Diner
"The Heart"	1989	—	13	—	Survivor
"I'm a Survivor"	1989	—	57	—	Survivor
"Hard Luck Ace"	1989	—	38	75	Survivor
"Black Coffee"	1990	—	15	19	Lacy J.
"Where Did We Go Right?"	1990	—	— (Note: "Where Did We Go Right?" did not chart on Hot Country Songs, but peaked at No. 7 on Hot Country Radio Breakouts.)	—	Lacy J.
"Lonesome (As the Night Is Long)"	1990	—	—	71	Lacy J.
"Forever in My Heart"	1991	—	—	—	Crazy Love
"Lightnin' Strikes a Good Man"	1991	—	—	—	Crazy Love
"The Deal"	1991	—	—	—	Crazy Love
"Bye Bye Love" (with Eddie Rabbitt)	1992	—	—	69	Chains on the Wind
"Wild Pony Lullaby"	1999	—	—	—	Wild Horse Crossing
"Run Mustang Run"	1999	—	—	—	Wild Horse Crossing
"Let 'em Run"	1999	—	—	—	Wild Horse Crossing
"Horse Comin'"	1999	—	—	—	Wild Horse Crossing
"Heart of Hearts"	2006	—	—	—	—N/a
"We Are Rotary"	2011	—	—	—	—N/a
"This Close"	2011	—	—	—	—N/a
"Next to Me"	2013	—	—	—	—N/a
"Carl the Christmas Dog"	2017	—	—	—	—N/a
"I Can't Breathe"	2020	—	—	—	—N/a
"Texas Taliban"	2022	—	—	—	—N/a
"16th Avenue" (re-recorded)	2023	—	—	—	—N/a
"Devil by a Different Name"	2023	—	—	—	For the Black Sheep
"Summerland"	2024	—	—	—	For the Black Sheep
"What Don't Kill Ya!"	2024	—	—	—	For the Black Sheep
"Common Ground"	2026	—	—	—	—N/a
"—" denotes a recording that did not chart or was not released in that territory.

=== As a collaborative or featured artist ===
List of singles, with selected chart positions, showing other relevant details
Title	Year	Peak chart positions		Album
Title	Year	US Cou.	CAN Cou.	Album
"It's a Dirty Job" (with Bobby Bare)	1983	30	—	—N/a
"Size Seven Round (Made of Gold)" (George Jones with Lacy J. Dalton)	1985	19	11	Ladies' Choice
"Slow Movin' Outlaw" (Willie Nelson with Lacy J. Dalton)	1985	—	—	Half Nelson
"—" denotes a recording that did not chart or was not released in that territory.

== Other charted songs ==
List of songs, with selected chart positions, showing other relevant details
Title	Year	Peak chart positions		Album	Notes
Title	Year	US Cou.	CAN Cou.	Album	Notes
"Wild Turkey"	1981	5	33	Takin' It Easy	(Note: Released as the B-side to "Everybody Makes Mistakes". It was credited with the same peak on the US country chart as the A-side while reaching its own position on the Canadian country chart.)

== Music videos ==
Year	Single	Director
1989	"I'm a Survivor"	Jim May/Clarke Gallivan
1990	"Black Coffee"	Michael Salomon
1991	"Lightnin’ Strikes A Good Man"	Deaton-Flanigen Productions
