= Sunny Sweeney discography =

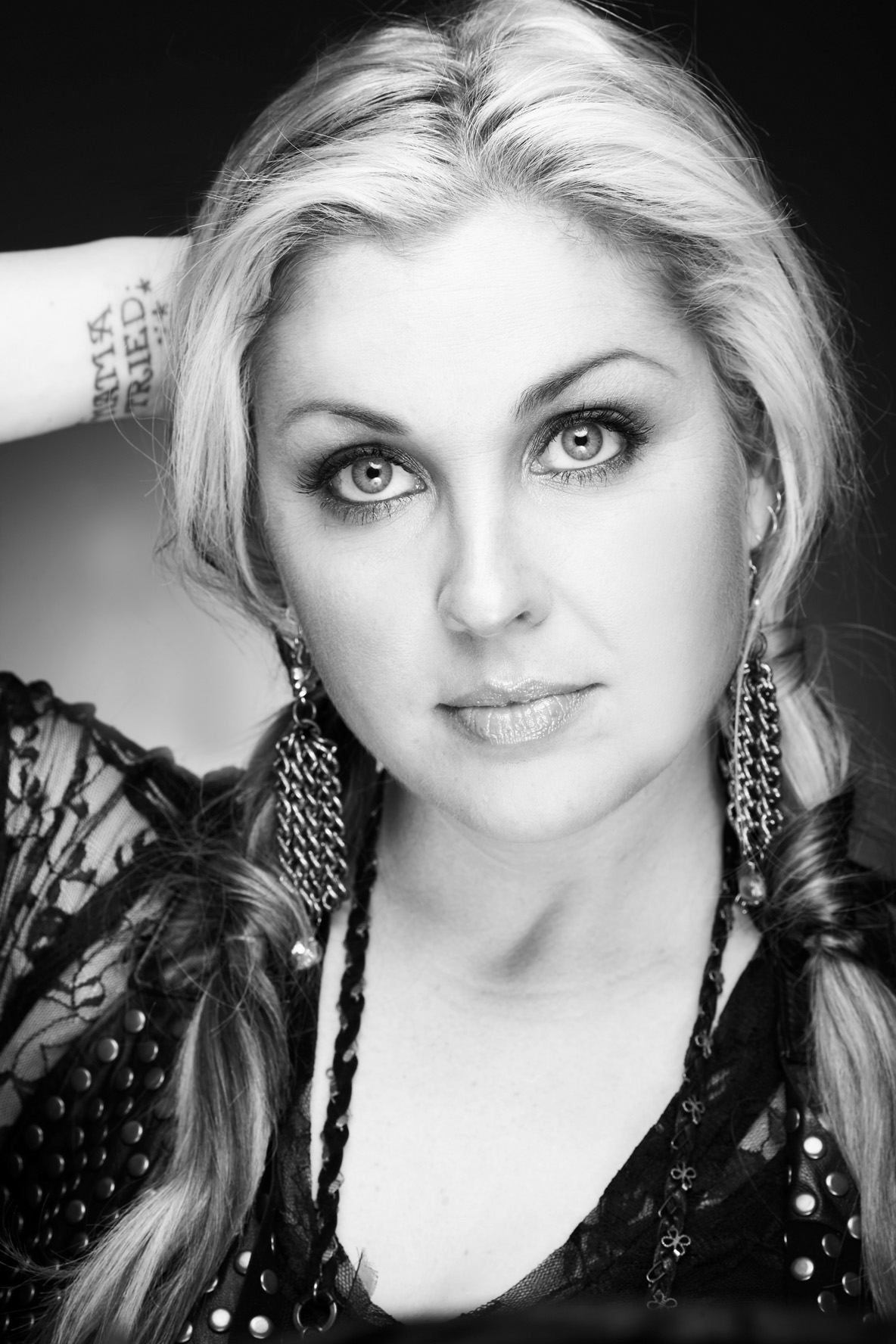
- Sunny Sweeney promotional image, 2010.
- Studio albums: 5
- EPs: 1
- Live albums: 1
- Singles: 16
- Music videos: 5
- Collaborative singles: 3
- Other album appearances: 4

The discography of American country singer–songwriter Sunny Sweeney contains five studio albums, one live album, one extended play (EP), 16 singles (three of which were collaborative releases), five music videos and has made four album appearances. Her debut studio album Heartbreaker's Hall of Fame was first released in 2006. It was re-released the following year by Big Machine Records. Moving to their subsidiary label, Republic Nashville, Sweeney's second studio album was released called Concrete (2011). The disc reached number seven on the American Billboard Top Country Albums chart and number 21 on the Billboard 200. Three charting singles were spawned. Its most successful was 2010's "From a Table Away", which reached number ten on the Billboard Hot Country Songs chart and number 59 on the Billboard Hot 100.

In 2014, Sweeney's third studio album was issued called Provoked. It reached number 20 on the Top Country Albums chart and number 114 on the Billboard 200. It also made the Billboard Top Independent Albums list, peaking at number 25. Three singles were spawned from the disc, including 2014's "Bad Girl Phase". A duet from the album called "My Bed" was given its own music video in 2015. In 2017, Sweeney's fourth studio album was released titled Trophy. It reached number 24 on the Billboard Independent Albums chart and number 20 on its Top Folk Albums chart. Among its single releases was 2017's "Better Bad Idea". In 2020, her first live album was issued on the Thirty Tigers label titled Recorded Live at the Machine Shop Recording Studio. In 2022, Sweeney's fifth studio disc was released called Married Alone.

== Albums ==
=== Studio albums ===
List of studio albums, with selected chart positions and sales, showing other details
Title	Album details	Peak chart positions				Sales
Title	Album details	US	US Cou.	US Folk	US Ind.	Sales
Heartbreaker's Hall of Fame	Released: March 3, 2006 (Note: On March 6, 2007, Heartbreaker's Hall of Fame was re-released on Big Machine Records.); Label: Self-released; Formats: CD	—	—	—	—	
Concrete	Released: August 23, 2011; Label: Republic Nashville; Formats: CD, music download	21	7	—	—	US: 26,418
Provoked	Released: August 5, 2014; Label: Thirty Tigers; Formats: CD, music download	165	20	—	25	US: 2,900
Trophy	Released: March 20, 2017; Label: Thirty Tigers; Formats: CD, music download	—	— (Note: Trophy did not chart on Top Country Albums, but peaked at No. 21 on the Country Album Sales chart.)	20	24	US: 2,300
Married Alone	Released: September 23, 2022; Label: Thirty Tigers; Formats: CD, LP, music download	—	—	—	—	
Rhinestone Requiem	Released: August 1, 2025; Label: Thirty Tigers; Formats: CD, LP, music download	—	—	—	—	
"—" denotes a recording that did not chart or was not released in that territory.

=== Live albums ===
List of live albums, showing all relevant details
Title	Album details
Recorded Live At The Machine Shop Recording Studio	Released: November 13, 2020; Label: Thirty Tigers; Formats: CD, music download

== Extended plays ==
List of EP's, with selected chart positions, showing other details
Title	EP details	Peak chart positions	
Title	EP details	US Cou.	US Hea.
Sunny Sweeney	Released: January 18, 2011; Label: Republic Nashville; Formats: Music download	41	12

== Singles ==
=== As lead artist ===
List of singles, with selected chart positions, showing other relevant details
Title	Year	Peak chart positions		Album
Title	Year	US	US Cou.	Album
"If I Could"	2007	—	—	Heartbreaker's Hall of Fame
"Ten Years Pass"	2008	—	—	Heartbreaker's Hall of Fame
"From a Table Away"	2010	71	10	Concrete
"Staying's Worse Than Leaving"	2011	—	38	Concrete
"Drink Myself Single"	2011	—	36	Concrete
"Bad Girl Phase"	2014	—	—	Provoked
"My Bed" (with Will Hoge)	2015	—	—	Provoked
"One More Christmas Beer"	2016	—	—	—N/a
"Heartbroke"	2017	—	—	—N/a
"Better Bad Idea"	2017	—	—	Trophy
"Bottle by My Bed"	2017	—	—	Trophy
"Poet's Prayer"	2020	—	—	—N/a
"A Song Can't Fix Everything" (with Paul Cauthen)	2022	—	—	Married Alone
"Diamonds and Divorce Decrees"	2025	—	—	Rhinestone Requiem
"—" denotes a recording that did not chart or was not released in that territory.

=== As a collaborative artist ===
List of collaborative singles, showing all relevant details
Title	Year	Album	Ref.
"But You Like Country Music" (with Brennen Leigh)	2015	—N/a	
"Storms Never Last" (with Jim Lauderdale)	2017	—N/a	
"Red Dirt Girl" (with Jamie Lin Wilson)	2023	—N/a	
"Don't Think Twice, It's All Right" (with Miko Marks, Rissi Palmer, and Tami Neilson)	2023	—N/a	

== Music videos ==
List of music videos, showing year released and director
Title	Year	Director(s)	Ref.
"If I Could"	2007	—N/a	
"From a Table Away"	2010	David McClister	
"Staying's Worse Than Leaving"	2011	Roman White	
"My Bed" (with Will Hoge)	2015	Michael Ponce	
"Bottle by My Bed"	2017	—N/a	

== Other album appearances ==
List of non-single guest appearances, with other performing artists, showing year released and album name
Title	Year	Other artist(s)	Album	Ref.
"Straighten Up (And Lie Right)"	2009	Dallas Wayne	I'll Take the Fifth	
"Good Hearted Woman"	2011	Jessi Colter	The Music Inside: A Collaboration Dedicated to Waylon Jennings, Vol. 1	
"Happy Hour"	2015	—N/a	Cold and Bitter Tears: The Songs of Ted Hawkins	
"The Contriest"	2021	Adam Hood	Welcome to the Big World	
