= Everybody Makes Mistakes =

Everybody Makes Mistakes may refer to:

- Everybody Makes Mistakes (Starflyer 59 album), 1999
- Everybody Makes Mistakes (Shearwater album), 2002
- "Everybody Makes Mistakes", a song by Lacy J. Dalton from her 1981 album Takin' It Easy
- "Everybody Makes Mistakes", a song by Monrose from the album Strictly Physical (album)
