= Turn It Loose =

Single by The Judds

from the album Heartland
- B-side: "Cow Cow Boogie"
- Released: January 9, 1988
- Studio: Creative Workshop (Berry Hill, Tennessee)
- Genre: Country
- Length: 3:43
- Label: RCA/Curb
- Songwriter(s): Craig Bickhardt; Don Schlitz; Brent Maher
- Producer(s): Brent Maher

The Judds singles chronology
"Maybe Your Baby's Got the Blues" (1987)	"Turn It Loose" (1988)	"Give a Little Love" (1988)

"Turn it Loose" is a song written by Craig Bickhardt, Don Schlitz and Brent Maher, and recorded by American country music duo The Judds. It was released in January 1988 as the fourth single from the album Heartland. The song was their eleventh number one country single. The single went to number one for one week and spent a total of twelve weeks on the country chart.

== Chart performance ==
"Turn It Loose" debuted on the U.S. Billboard Hot Country Singles & Tracks for the week of January 16, 1988.

=== Weekly charts ===
Chart (1988)	Peak position
US Hot Country Songs (Billboard)	1
Canadian RPM Country Tracks	5

=== Year-end charts ===
Chart (1988)	Position
US Hot Country Songs (Billboard)	68
