= Heartland (The Judds album) =

Studio album by the Judds
- Released: February 2, 1987
- Studio: Creative Workshop (Berry Hill, Tennessee)
- Genre: Country
- Length: 32:36
- Label: RCA Victor
- Producer: Brent Maher

The Judds chronology
Rockin' with the Rhythm (1985)	Heartland (1987)	Christmas Time with the Judds (1987)

Singles from Heartland
- 1. "Don't Be Cruel" Released: January 1987; 2. "I Know Where I'm Going" Released: April 27, 1987; 3. "Maybe Your Baby's Got the Blues" Released: August 17, 1987; 4. "Turn It Loose" Released: January 9, 1988

Heartland is the third studio album by American country music duo the Judds, released on February 3, 1987, by RCA Records. It features the singles "Don't Be Cruel" (the Elvis Presley song), "Maybe Your Baby's Got the Blues", "Turn It Loose", and "I Know Where I'm Going". The album was released in Europe under the title Give a Little Love and featured six bonus tracks. It reached number 1 on England's country albums chart in 1987, soon after the Judds toured there.

== Critical reception ==
Professional ratings
Review scores
Source	Rating
AllMusic	3/5 stars

Billboard reviewed the album in the issue dated February 7, 1987. The review said, "With each new outing, the Judds become more vocally adventurous and more eager to assert their delicate mastery over wide-ranging material, new and old. This album–as mournfully country as 'The Sweetest Gift' and as airily jazzy as 'Cow Cow Boogie'–floats confidently just above grasping tentacles of format. Maher relies almost totally on acoustic backing to trace and emphasize the Judds' vocal beauty; Heartland has all the elements to earn the Judds universal acceptance."

Cashbox published a review of the album in the February 28, 1987, issue that said, "The names under these cuts are a testament in themselves to the star power the mama/daughter duo now possesses: Don Schlitz, Craig Bickhardt, Brent Maher, KT. Oslin, Troy Seals — and on and on. There are some standouts in the crowd nonetheless, including 'Turn It Loose', 'Old Pictures', and the citified, tongue-in-cheek 'Cow Cow Boogie'. And, men, you don't need Dr. Ruth–just listen to 'Maybe Your Baby's Got the Blues'."

Thom Jurek of AllMusic felt that the album "walks a thin line between roots rock and mainstream country," but criticized it as sounding "a tad uneven...because the great songs...outshine the ballads." He concluded that this "doesn't make [it] a bad or substandard record in any way, just one that creates a tension within itself that remains unresolved."

== Track listing ==
Heartland track listing
No.	Title	Writer(s)	Length
1.	"Don't Be Cruel"	Otis Blackwell; Elvis Presley	2:28
2.	"I'm Falling in Love Tonight"	Craig Bickhardt; Brent Maher; Don Potter	3:44
3.	"Turn It Loose"	Bickhardt; Maher; Don Schlitz	3:43
4.	"Old Pictures"	Jerry Gillespie; K.T. Oslin	4:29
5.	"Cow Cow Boogie"	Benny Carter; Gene de Paul; Don Raye	3:31
6.	"Maybe Your Baby's Got the Blues"	Graham Lyle; Troy Seals	3:31
7.	"I Know Where I'm Going"	Bickhardt, Maher, Schlitz	3:38
8.	"Why Don't You Believe Me"	Maher; Potter; Schlitz	3:27
9.	"The Sweetest Gift (A Mother's Smile)"	James B. Coats	3:53

UK Give a Little Love bonus tracks
No.	Title	Writer(s)	Length
10.	"Give a Little Love to Me"	Bickhardt; Potter; Maher	3:04
11.	"Had a Dream (For the Heart)"	Dennis Linde	3:10
12.	"John Deere Tractor"	Lawrence Hammond	3:28
13.	"Isn't He a Strange One"	Kent Robbins	3:25
14.	"Blue Nun Cafe"	Harlan Howard; Maher	2:27
15.	"Change of Heart"	Naomi Judd	3:28

- Note: Track 10 is previously unreleased, while tracks 11–15 are taken from the 1984 EP Wynonna & Naomi.

== Personnel ==
The Judds

- Naomi Judd – vocals
- Wynonna Judd – vocals

Additional Musicians

- Bobby Ogdin – organ, piano
- Craig Bickhardt, Mark Casstevens – acoustic guitar, electric guitar
- Don Potter – acoustic guitar
- Sonny Garrish – pedal steel guitar, Dobro
- Kirk "Jelly Roll" Johnson – harmonica
- Craig Nelson – acoustic bass, bass guitar
- Jack Williams – bass guitar
- David Schnaufer – dulcimer
- Eddie Bayers – drums
- Farrell Morris – percussion
- The Jordanaires – backing vocals on "Don't Be Cruel"
- Emmylou Harris – duet vocals on "The Sweetest Gift (A Mother's Smile)

Production

- Produced & Mixed by Brent Maher
- Engineered by Brent Maher, Joe Funderburk & Jim McKell
- Mastered by Glenn Meadows

== Charts ==
=== Weekly charts ===
Chart (1987)	Peak position
Canadian Albums (RPM)	40
US Billboard 200	52
US Top Country Albums (Billboard)	1

=== Year-end charts ===
Chart (1987)	Position
US Top Country Albums (Billboard)	6
Chart (1988)	Position
US Top Country Albums (Billboard)	17
