= Givers and Takers =

Single by Schuyler, Knobloch, and Bickhardt

from the album No Easy Horses
- B-side: "People Still Fall in Love"
- Released: April 23, 1988
- Genre: Country
- Length: 3:42
- Label: MTM
- Songwriter(s): Craig Bickhardt
- Producer(s): James Stroud

Schuyler, Knobloch, and Bickhardt singles chronology
"This Old House" (1988)	"Givers and Takers" (1988)	"Rigamarole" (1988)

"Givers and Takers" is a song written by Craig Bickhardt and recorded by American country music group Schuyler, Knobloch, and Bickhardt. It was released in April 1988 as the third single from the album No Easy Horses. The song reached #8 on the Billboard Hot Country Singles & Tracks chart.

== Charts ==
=== Weekly charts ===
Chart (1988)	Peak position
US Hot Country Songs (Billboard)	8
Canadian RPM Country Tracks	8

=== Year-end charts ===
Chart (1988)	Position
US Hot Country Songs (Billboard)	85
