= The Castellows =

American country music trio

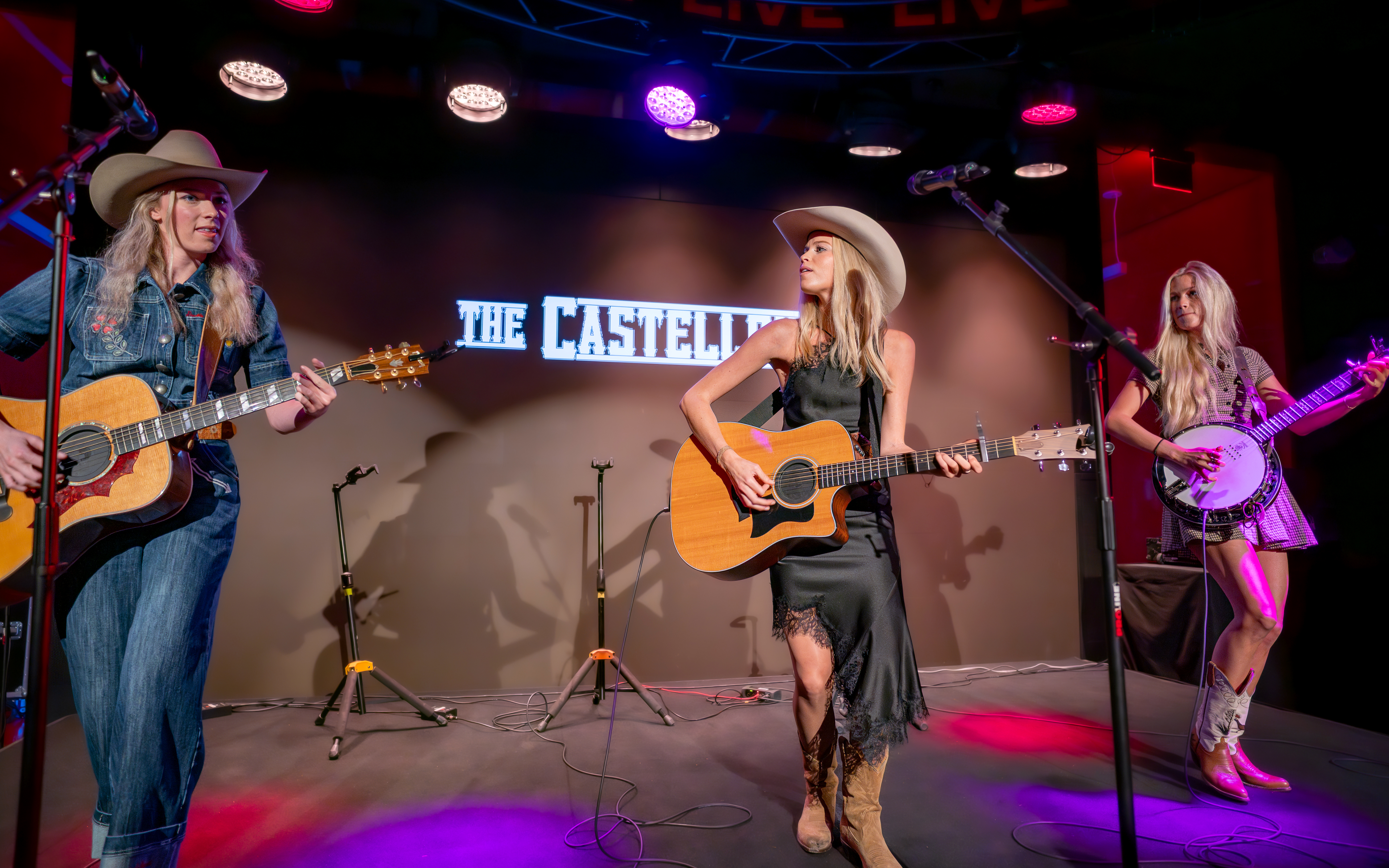
- The Castellows (left to right: Ellie, Lily and Powell) at Coke Studio at L.A. Live in Los Angeles, September 2025

Background information
- Also known as: The Balkcom Sisters
- Origin: Georgetown, Georgia, US
- Genres: Neotraditional country; Americana; bluegrass; country folk
- Years active: 2022–present
- Labels: Warner Music Nashville; Warner
- Members: Eleanor Balkcom; Lily Balkcom; Powell Balkcom
- Website: thecastellowsmusic.com

The Castellows (originally known as the Balkcom Sisters) are an American neotraditional country music trio consisting of sisters Eleanor, Lily, and Powell Balkcom. Eleanor and Powell are two of triplets. Their sister Lily is 18 months younger than them. Born in Georgetown, Georgia, the sisters moved to Nashville in 2023 and signed a record deal with Warner Music Nashville and Warner Records. Their first EP, A Little Goes a Long Way, was released on February 9, 2024. Castellow was their great-grandmother's maiden name.

== Career ==
The Castellows began attracting attention in 2022 through posting cover song performances to Instagram and TikTok. In January 2023, the group caught interest from insiders in the music industry. The sisters had not considered a career in music until March 2023. By spring 2024, the trio had received interest from the industry nationwide. In October 2024, they signed a record deal with WMN and Warner Records, and released their debut single "No. 7 Road". A cover of Leon Everette's "Hurricane" followed in November 2024 and "I Know It'll Never End" in January 2024 was next. Their debut EP, titled A Little Goes a Long Way and produced by Trina Shoemaker, was released on February 9, 2025. The song "I Know It Will Never End" received a CMT digital-first performance of the year nomination at the 2024 CMT Music Awards in Austin, Texas.

== Members ==
- Eleanor "Ellie" Balkcom – acoustic guitar, piano, backing vocals
- Lily Balkcom – lead vocals, acoustic guitar, bass guitar, harmonica
- Powell Balkcom – banjo, backing vocals

== Discography ==
=== Extended plays ===
Title	EP details
A Little Goes a Long Way	Released: February 9, 2024; Label: Warner Nashville, Warner Records; Format: CD, streaming, digital download

=== Singles ===
Year	Song	Album
2023	"No. 7 Road"	A Little Goes a Long Way
2023	"Hurricane"	A Little Goes a Long Way
2024	"I Know It'll Never End"	A Little Goes a Long Way
2024	"Place to Leave"	Alabama Stone
2025	"Sheltered"	Homecoming
