= Band of Heathens =

American band

The Band of Heathens
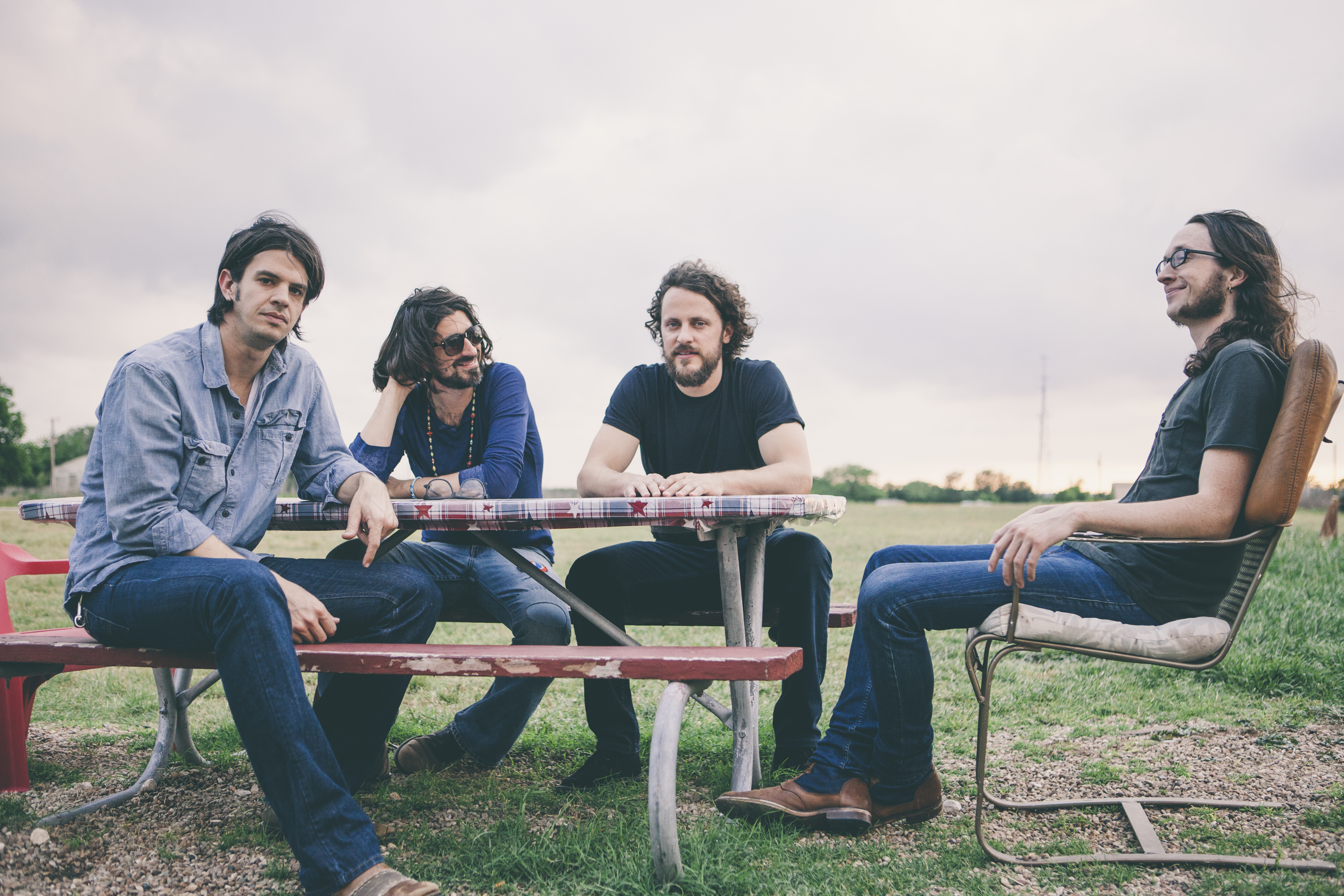
- The Band of Heathens on a promotional photo for their 2013 album Sunday Morning Record.

Background information
- Origin: Austin, Texas
- Genres: Americana; folk rock; country; blues; jam rock; roots rock; blue-eyed soul
- Years active: 2005–present
- Labels: BOH Records, Blue Rose Records
- Members: Ed Jurdi; Gordy Quist; Trevor Nealon; Clint Simmons; Nick Jay
- Past members: Colin Brooks; Seth Whitney; John Chipman; Ryan Bowman; Brian Keane; Eldridge Goins; Scott Davis; Richard Millsap; Jesse Wilson
- Website: www.bandofheathens.com

The Band of Heathens is an American rock and roll band from Austin, Texas. The band was originally formed by Colin Brooks, Ed Jurdi and Gordy Quist in 2005.

== History ==
The three original principal songwriters - Colin Brooks, Ed Jurdi and Gordy Quist - shared the bill at Momo's, an Austin club. Originally, each singer/songwriter performed his own set. However, they eventually started sharing the stage, and collaborating with bassist Seth Whitney. The Wednesday night series was billed as "The Good Time Supper Club". A misprint in a local paper billed the act as "The Heathens". Drummer John Chipman joined the band in 2007, and keyboardist Trevor Nealon, who played in the studio during the recording of both One Foot in the Ether and Top Hat Crown & the Clapmaster's Son, joined the touring unit in 2011.

Their first recording, Live from Momo's, recorded at the now closed club on West 6th Street in Austin brought the band national attention and they were voted "Best New Band" at the 2007 Austin Music Awards. Following the Momo's release, the band released a second live recording, the CD/DVD Live at Antone's which was recorded at the Austin club.

On May 20, 2008, the band released their first, self-titled, studio album. Produced by Ray Wylie Hubbard, and featuring notable guests Patty Griffin, Stephen Bruton, and Gurf Morlix, the record went to number one on the Americana Music Association's radio chart. In November 2008 the album was ranked in eighth place on the Americana Music Association's Top 100 Albums of the Americana Charts for 2008.

In July 2009 BOH taped an Austin City Limits show that aired in late 2009, as ACL was celebrating its 35th anniversary year. The band's unique genesis and creativity were highlighted during the Austin City Limits interview conducted after their performance. The TV performance showcased a set by both the Band Of Heathens and Elvis Costello.

Following the Austin City Limits PBS show, the band also played on the German television live concert series Rockpalast on October 9, 2009, performing 14 songs, many from the albums Band Of Heathens and One Foot In The Ether. One Foot In The Ether, BOH's second studio release once again charted to the number one slot on the Americana Radio Chart.

In 2009, the band was nominated for a "New Emerging Artist" award at the Americana Music Honors & Awards. In 2010, the band was again honored by the Americana Music Association as nominees for the "Best Duo/Group of the Year".

In 2011, the band released their fifth album overall (third studio album) Top Hat Crown & the Clapmaster's Son. The album was listed in the top 10 most played Americana Albums of 2011, marking the third album in a row to make the year end top 10 list. This album is also the last studio project featuring founding member Colin Brooks, who announced in November that year that he was leaving the band after six years to pursue other interests.

2013 provided the critically acclaimed album, Sunday Morning Record. The "Bakersfield Californian Review" aptly stated "Sunday Morning Record is a love letter to the past and, at the same time, a postcard to the future." The album charted to the number two spot on the Americana Chart (Americana Music Association) and was selected as the number one album in 2013 by "The Alternative Root". In addition, "The Alternative Root" in referring to its "Top Fifty" Americana Bands stated the following: "The number one spot was the easiest to place. Band of Heathens epitomize Indie, building their band business from the ground up and keeping everything in-house".

Highway Prayer: A Tribute to Adam Carroll, released in late 2016 on Austin-based Eight 30 Records, featured The Band of Heathens' version of Carroll's "Oklahoma Gypsy Shuffler". Additionally, the Band of Heathens' version of "The Dirty South" was included on the satirical album Floater: A Tribute to the Tributes to Gary Floater, released early in 2018 on the Austin-based Eight 30 Records.

=== Members ===
Current members

- Ed Jurdi – vocals, guitars, harmonica, keyboards (2005–present)
- Gordy Quist– vocals, guitars, harmonica (2005–present)
- Trevor Nealon– keyboards (2011–present)
- Clint Simmons– drums (2022–present)
- Nick Jay– bass (2022–present)

Former members

- Colin Brooks – vocals, guitars (2005–2011)
- Seth Whitney – bass, vocals (2005–2012)
- John Chipman – drums, vocals (2007–2012)
- Ryan Bowman - bass (2012-2013)
- Brian Keane– vocals, keyboards, guitars (2005–2006)
- Eldridge Goins – drums, vocals (2005–2006)
- Scott Davis– bass, vocals (2013–2017)
- Richard Millsap– drums (2012–2022)
- Jesse Wilson– bass, vocals (2017–2022)

== Live recordings ==
The band started recording all of their live performances in February 2012 and making them available at the conclusion of each show on a USB drive. Each drive contains that night's audio recording, photos from the day of touring, and a video (when possible). Later, the band launched live.bandofheathens.com where the audio recordings are available either by subscription or a la carte download. Ed Jurdi said the band embraced the idea of sharing as much of their music as possible, "We play different set lists night to night and we'll play songs differently over time and they will evolve. And that's another outlet for fans to follow the band and explore what we are doing. So our attitude is to share it as much as we can."

== Discography ==
The band’s first two recordings were live performances: a 2006 live album recorded at Momo's, followed by the 2007 CD/DVD set Live at Antone's. In May 2008, the band released its first studio production simply titled "The Band of Heathens". Produced by Ray Wylie Hubbard, the album reached number one on the Americana Chart and the EuroAmericana chart. It was only the second independently released album to ever reach number one on the Chart.

In September 2009 the band released the album One Foot in the Ether which again made it to number one on the Americana as well as the Euroamericana chart.

A cover of Leon Everette's "Hurricane" charted at number 18 on Hot Rock Songs in 2018.

In 2024 The Band of Heathens teamed up with Hayes Carll to create Hayes & The Heathens for a limited album release and tour. Hayes & The Heathens opened for Turnpike Troubadours at Red Rocks Amphitheatre on May 8, 2025.

Colin Brooks (solo)

- 2002: Chippin' Away at the Promised Land
- 2005: Blood & Water

Gordy Quist (solo)

- 2005: Songs Play Me
- 2007: Here Comes the Flood

Ed Jurdi (solo)

- 1999: Ed Jurdi
- 2003: Longshores Drive

The Band of Heathens

- 2006: Live from Momo's
- 2007: Live at Antone's (CD+DVD)
- 2008: The Band of Heathens (first studio production)
- 2009: Live @ Blue Rose Christmas Party Germany 2008 (limited edition)
- 2009: One Foot In the Ether, (second studio production)
- 2011: Top Hat Crown & The Clapmaster's Son (third studio production)
- 2012: The Double Down - Live From Denver (CD+DVD)
- 2013: Sunday Morning Record (fourth studio production)
- 2016: Duende (fifth studio production)
- 2018: A Message from the People Revisited (sixth studio production)
- 2020: Stranger (seventh studio production)
- 2022: Remote Transmissions, Volume 1
- 2023: Simple Things (eighth studio production)
- 2023: Simpler Things (stripped down acoustic version of Simple Things)
- 2025: All That Remains (Live) produced in collaboration with The Band of Heathens Patreon Members
- 2026: Country Sides (ninth studio production)

Hayes and The Heathens

- 2024: Hayes & The Heathens (collaboration with Hayes Carll)
