= Heartbreaker's Hall of Fame =

Studio album by Sunny Sweeney
- Released: March 6, 2007
- Studio: Cherry Ridge Studios (Floresville, Texas); Chicken Hill Studios (Arrington, Tennessee)
- Genre: Country
- Length: 39:22
- Label: Big Machine
- Producer: Tommy Detamore; Tom Lewis; Sunny Sweeney

Sunny Sweeney chronology
Heartbreaker's Hall of Fame (2007)	Concrete (2011)

Singles from Heartbreaker's Hall of Fame
- 1. "If I Could" Released: 2007

Heartbreaker's Hall of Fame is the first studio album by American country music singer Sunny Sweeney. It was self released in March 2006, then re-released in March 2007 via Big Machine Records. The album included the single "If I Could".

== Content ==
"Please Be San Antone" was co-written by Emily Erwin (now known as Emily Robison) of the Dixie Chicks, and was previously recorded by Jim Lauderdale on his 1999 album Onward Through It All. "16th Avenue" was previously a Top 10 hit for Lacy J. Dalton from her 1982 album of the same name. "Mama's Opry" by Iris DeMent had appeared on DeMent's 1992 album Infamous Angel. Sweeney self-penned the title track "Heartbreakers Hall of Fame" and "Slow Swinging Western Tunes" as well as co-wrote "Ten Years Pass" with Elizabeth Mason.

== Critical reception ==
Professional ratings
Review scores
Source	Rating
AllMusic	4/5 stars
The Austin Chronicle	3/5 stars
Entertainment Weekly	B+
PopMatters	8/10

Heartbreaker's Hall of Fame received favorable reviews from music critics. Michael Berick, who reviewed the album for AllMusic, called it "a refreshing slice of traditional honky tonk enlivened with a dollop of rock & roll energy[…]She has a strong idea of who she is as a singer and performer, and her instincts are proven correct on this impressive effort." Chris Willman of Entertainment Weekly called it "the kind of roadhouse fare typically tagged 'too country for country'." Country Standard Time critic Stuart Munro gave a favorable review as well, noting the mix of material on the album, and describing Sweeney's voice as being "full of sass and syrupy twang." Jeff McCord of Texas Monthly wrote that: "There aren't many practitioners left of this kind of music—unadorned instrumentation augmented by pedal steel, pronounced rural accents that turn words like "well" into three syllables—which makes this gem of an album so refreshing. Sweeney's writing has a ways to go, but she's smart enough to surround herself with veterans (Jim Lauderdale's "Refresh My Memory" is a real standout), and she sings as if it's exactly what she was born to do."

A writer for No Depression found Sweeney's original tracks "focused, if slightly less catchy" than her covers, but felt "it's her vocals that'll catch you by the throat", saying, "Not many debut discs sound this confident, poised, and excited." Despite finding fault in her backing band being "on the side of cookie-cutter, taking few chances", Eric Thom of Exclaim! praised Sweeney's vocal performance for coming across as "a balls-to-the-walls honky tonker who sings with the confidence of a seasoned veteran", saying "[T]his is a heartbreaking and powerful debut." Jim Caligiuri of The Austin Chronicle praised the album's "impeccable" production but was critical of the songs, saying there were "already definitive versions" of "East Texas Pines" and "If I Could" but found "Next Big Nothing" to be "a two-stepper's delight," and "Lavender Blue" had "the right tinge of sorrow", concluding that "Sweeney isn't much of a writer – yet – but it's obvious she possesses plenty of talent to be shaking things up for a long time."

== Track listing ==
No.	Title	Writer(s)	Length
1.	"Refresh My Memory"	Jim Lauderdale; John Scott Sherrill	3:23
2.	"East Texas Pines"	Libbi Bosworth; Gary Griffin	3:20
3.	"Next Big Nothing"	Audrey Auld	3:14
4.	"Lavender Blue"	Keith Sykes	3:18
5.	"Ten Years Pass"	Sunny Sweeney; Elizabeth Mason	3:24
6.	"Here Kinda Lately"	Deron Harris	2:50
7.	"Heartbreaker's Hall of Fame"	Sweeney	2:34
8.	"Slow Swinging Western Tunes"	Sweeney	4:35
9.	"Please Be San Antone"	Emily Erwin; Lauderdale	2:20
10.	"Mama's Opry"	Iris DeMent	4:07
11.	"If I Could"	Tim Carroll	2:19
12.	"16th Avenue"	Thom Schuyler	3:58

== Personnel ==
- Lars Albrecht - electric guitar
- David Carroll - bass guitar
- Gary Wayne Claxton - background vocals
- Tommy Detamore - dobro, electric guitar, lap steel guitar, pedal steel guitar
- Skip Edwards - Hammond organ
- Bobby Flores - fiddle, mandolin
- D.B. Harris - background vocals
- Terje Kinn - banjo
- Jim Lauderdale - background vocals
- Tom Lewis - drums, percussion
- Eddie "Scarlito" Perez - background vocals
- Casper Rawls - acoustic guitar, hi-string guitar
- Ted Roddy - harmonica
- Sunny Sweeney - lead vocals, background vocals

== Release history ==
Release dates and formats for Heartbreaker's Hall of Fame
Region	Date	Format(s)	Label	Ref.
United States	March 3, 2006	CD	Self-released	
United States	March 6, 2007	CD	Big Machine	
