= 2024 CMT Music Awards =

Annual US country music awards ceremony

- Date: April 7, 2024
- Location: Moody Center, Austin, Texas
- Hosted by: Kelsea Ballerini

Highlights
- Most wins: Jelly Roll (3)
- Most nominations: Kelsea Ballerini; Cody Johnson; Jelly Roll; Megan Moroney; (3 each)

Television/radio coverage
- Network: CBS, Paramount+ (Streaming Live)
- Viewership: 5.4 million

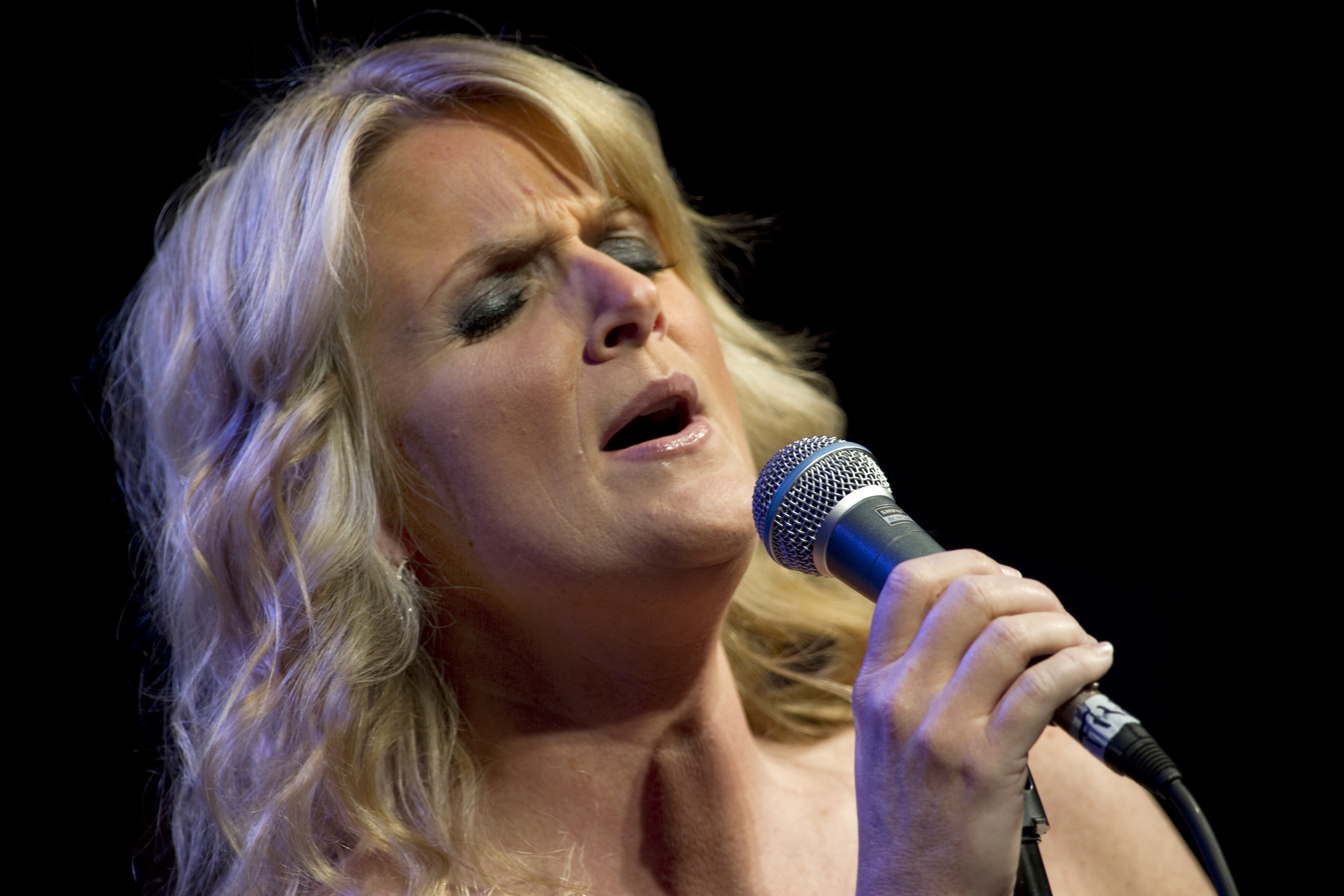
Trisha Yearwood received the inaugural June Carter Cash Humanitarian Award.

The 2024 CMT Music Awards, the 23rd edition of the awards ceremony, was held at the Moody Center in Austin, Texas, on April 7, 2024. Kelsea Ballerini returned as host of the ceremony.

== Background ==
The CMT Music Awards is country music's only entirely fan-voted awards show. Kelsea Ballerini hosted the show for the fourth-consecutive year, and unlike the three previous years, she hosted solo. The ceremony aired on CBS and available to stream live and on-demand on Paramount+.

=== June Carter Cash Humanitarian Award ===
On March 25, CMT announced Trisha Yearwood would receive the inaugural "June Carter Cash Humanitarian Award", which "recognizes an artist, duo/group or industry veteran who demonstrates an exceptional dedication to the community and their fellow artists as Cash did." Yearwood also performed at the ceremony. Actress and friend of Carter Cash, Jane Seymour, presented the award.

=== Toby Keith Tribute ===
On April 4, CMT announced that Brooks & Dunn, Lainey Wilson, and Sammy Hagar would perform a tribute to CMT Award winner and country music icon, Toby Keith, who died on February 5, 2024.

== Nominees and winners ==
Nominees were announced on March 13, 2024. On April 1, the Video of the Year nominees decreased to only the top six videos.; on April 4 the nominees went from the top six to the top three.

Video of the Year	Female Video of the Year
Jelly Roll — "Need a Favor"; Kelsea Ballerini — "If You Go Down (I'm Goin' Down Too)"; Cody Johnson — "The Painter"; Darius Rucker — "Fires Don't Start Themselves"	Lainey Wilson — "Watermelon Moonshine"; Gabby Barrett — "Glory Days"; Kelsea Ballerini — "Penthouse"; Ashley McBryde — "Light On In The Kitchen"; Reba McEntire — "Seven Minutes In Heaven"; Megan Moroney — "I'm Not Pretty"; Kacey Musgraves — "Deeper Well"
Male Video of the Year	Duo/Group Video of the Year
Jelly Roll — "Need a Favor"; Luke Combs — "Fast Car"; Jordan Davis — "Next Thing You Know"; Hardy — "Truck Bed"; Cody Johnson — "The Painter"; Morgan Wallen — "Last Night"; Bailey Zimmerman — "Religiously"	Dan + Shay — "Save Me the Trouble"; Brothers Osborne — "Nobody's Nobody"; Old Dominion — "Memory Lane"; Parmalee — "Girl in Mine"; Tigirlily Gold — "Shoot Tequila"; The War and Treaty — "Have You a Heart"
Female Breakthrough Video of the Year	Male Breakthrough Video of the Year
Ashley Cooke — "Your Place"; Brittney Spencer — "Bigger Than The Song"; Tigirlily Gold — "Shoot Tequila"; Anne Wilson — "Rain in the Rearview"	Warren Zeiders — "Pretty Little Poison"; Chayce Beckham — "23"; Zach Bryan — "Oklahoma Smokeshow"; Tyler Childers — "In Your Love"
Collaborative Video of the Year	CMT Digital—First Performance of the Year
Carly Pearce feat. Chris Stapleton — "We Don't Fight Anymore"; Mickey Guyton feat. Kane Brown — "Nothing Compares To You"; Ella Langley feat. Koe Wetzel — "That's Why We Fight"; Justin Moore and Priscilla Block — "You, Me, & Whiskey"; Lukas Nelson & Promise of the Real feat. Lainey Wilson — "More Than Friends"; Old Dominion feat. Megan Moroney — "Can't Break Up Now"; Jon Pardi and Luke Bryan — "Cowboys And Plowboys"	From CMT Stages: Scotty McCreery — "It Matters to Her"; From CMT Digital Campfire Sessions: Megan Moroney — "I'm Not Pretty"; From CMT Digital Campfire Sessions: Dylan Scott — "Don't Close Your Eyes (Keith Whitley Cover)"; From CMT Studio Sessions: The Castellows — "I Know It Will Never End"; From CMT Studio Sessions: Chase Rice — "Goodnight Nancy"; From CMT Studio Sessions: Nate Smith — "Whiskey On You"; From CMT Studio Sessions: Stephen Wilson Jr. — "Year to Be Young 1994"
CMT Performance of the Year
From 2023 CMT Music Awards: Jelly Roll — "Need a Favor"; From CMT Campfire Sessions: Dustin Lynch and MacKenzie Porter — "Thinking 'Bout You"; From CMT Crossroads: Hozier and Maren Morris — "Take Me To Church"; From CMT Crossroads: Bret Michaels and Chris Janson — "Nothing But a Good Time"; From 2023 CMT Music Awards: Kelsea Ballerini — "IF YOU GO DOWN (I'M GOIN' DOWN TOO)"; From 2023 CMT Music Awards: Cody Johnson — "Human"; From 2023 CMT Music Awards: Carrie Underwood — "Hate My Heart"; From CMT Smashing Glass: Amber Riley — "R.E.S.P.E.C.T."; From CMT Smashing Glass: The War and Treaty — "On My Own"; From CMT Storytellers: Dierks Bentley — "Drunk On A Plane"
June Carter Cash Humanitarian Award
Trisha Yearwood

== Performers ==
Performers were announced on March 26.

Performer(s)	Song(s)
Cody Johnson	"That's Texas"
Jason Aldean	"Let Your Boys Be Country"
Megan Moroney	"No Caller ID"
Parker McCollum; Brittney Spencer	"Burn It Down"
Jordan Davis; Needtobreathe	"Brother" "Next Thing You Know"
Lainey Wilson	"Country's Cool Again"
Bailey Zimmerman	"Where It Ends"
Keith Urban	"Straight Line"
Sam Hunt	"Locked Up"
Kelsea Ballerini	"Love Me Like You Mean It (Reimagined)"
Brooks & Dunn; Sammy Hagar; Lainey Wilson	Toby Keith Tribute "Should've Been a Cowboy" "I Love This Bar" "How Do You Like Me Now?!"
Old Dominion; Megan Moroney	"Can't Break Up Now"
Trisha Yearwood	"Put It in a Song"
Dasha	"Austin"
Little Big Town; Sugarland	"Take Me Home"
Jelly Roll	"Halfway to Hell"

== Presenters ==
- Emily Osment and Montana Jordan, introduced Megan Moroney
- Paul Walter Hauser, presented Collaborative Video of the Year
- Amber Riley, introduced Parker McCollum and Brittney Spencer
- Megan Moroney and Max Theriot, presented Breakthrough Female Video of the Year and Breakthrough Male Video of the Year
- Melissa Etheridge, introduced Jordan Davis and Needtobreathe (sang "Come To My Window" with Kelsea Ballerini)
- Jane Seymour, presented the June Carter Cash Humanitarian Award to Trisha Yearwood
- Jelly Roll, introduced Lainey Wilson
- Cody Alan, introduced Bailey Zimmerman and Old Dominion with Megan Moroney
- Emma Roberts, introduced Keith Urban
- Carly Pearce, presented CMT Performance of the Year
- Parmalee, introduced Sam Hunt
- James Van Der Beek, introduced Kelsea Ballerini
- Tanner Adell, Tiera Kennedy, Reyna Roberts and Brittney Spencer, presented Duo/Group Video of the Year
- Roger Clemens, Lukas Nelson and Riley Green, introduced Tribute to Toby Keith
- Cody Johnson, introduced Trisha Yearwood's performance
- Mickey Guyton, introduced Dasha
- Minnie Driver, presented Male Video of the Year
- Gayle King, presented Female Video of the Year
- Billy Bob Thornton, presented Video of the Year
