= Ex-Old Man =

Single by Kristen Kelly
- Released: April 30, 2012
- Genre: Country
- Length: 3:58
- Label: Arista Nashville
- Songwriters: Kristen Kelly; Paul Overstreet
- Producers: Tony Brown; Paul Overstreet

Kristen Kelly singles chronology
"Ex-Old Man" (2012)	"He Loves to Make Me Cry" (2013)

"Ex-Old Man" is a song recorded by American country music artist Kristen Kelly. It was released in April 2012 as Kelly's first single. Kelly wrote the song with Paul Overstreet.

== Critical reception ==
Billy Dukes of Taste of Country gave the song two and a half stars out of five, writing that "the plucky, mid-tempo cut showcases her big country voice, but seems written too long after the fact." Matt Bjorke of Roughstock gave the song a favorable review, saying that "the melody recalls classic hits of the distant past but it also has a sunny disposition to it as well." Ben Foster of Country Universe gave the song a B+ grade, writing that "it’s a refreshing change of pace to hear a new artist taking a back-to-basics approach – revisiting a classic yet often ignored country music theme, with a simple drum and acoustic guitar-driven arrangement that actually makes the song feel like country music."

== Music video ==
The music video was directed by Anna Mastro and premiered in August 2012.

== Chart performance ==
"Ex-Old Man" debuted at number 60 on the U.S. Billboard Hot Country Songs chart for the week of March 24, 2012.

Chart (2012)	Peak position
US Country Airplay (Billboard)	28
US Hot Country Songs (Billboard)	30

=== Year-end charts ===
Chart (2012)	Position
US Country Songs (Billboard)	95
