= Brave Heart (Thom Schuyler album) =

Studio album by Thom Schuyler
- Released: 1983
- Genre: Country
- Length: 39:03
- Label: Capitol
- Producer: David Malloy

Thom Schuyler chronology
Brave Heart (1983)	Precious Child (1993)

Brave Heart is a 1983 album by Thom Schuyler. It was his first album after signing a solo deal with Capitol Records and produced two top 30 singles.

== Track listing ==
No.	Title	Writer(s)	Length
1.	"Brave Heart"	Thom Schuyler	3:30
2.	"A Little at a Time"	Schuyler, Larry Byrom	3:03
3.	"Slow Dancing Girl"	Schuyler, Anthony Crawford	3:53
4.	"Must I Cry"	Schuyler	4:29
5.	"City Without a Heart"	Schuyler, Crawford	4:48
6.	"16th Avenue"	Schuyler	3:59
7.	"No Good Reason"	Schuyler, Spady Brannan	3:45
8.	"Easy Street"	Schuyler	4:14
9.	"Two-Way Street"	Schuyler	2:54
10.	"Acres of Pain"	Schuyler	4:28
