= Baby's Got a New Baby =

1986 single by S-K-O

Single by S-K-O

from the album Schuyler, Knobloch & Overstreet
- B-side: "Bitter Pill to Swallow"
- Released: December 6, 1986
- Genre: Country
- Length: 3:27
- Label: MTM
- Songwriter(s): J. Fred Knobloch; Dan Tyler
- Producer(s): James Stroud

S-K-O singles chronology
"You Can't Stop Love" (1986)	"Baby's Got a New Baby" (1986)	"American Me" (1987)

"Baby's Got a New Baby" is a song written by J. Fred Knobloch and Dan Tyler, and recorded by American country music group S-K-O. It was released in December 1986 as the second single from the album Schuyler, Knobloch & Overstreet. The song was S-K-O's second country hit and the group's only number one on the country chart. The single went to number one for one week and spent a total of fourteen weeks within the top 40.

== Charts ==
=== Weekly charts ===
Chart (1986–1987)	Peak position
US Hot Country Songs (Billboard)	1

=== Year-end charts ===
Chart (1987)	Position
US Hot Country Songs (Billboard)	44
