= Christmas Time with the Judds =

Studio album by the Judds
- Released: September 29, 1987
- Recorded: August 1987
- Studio: Creative Workshop (Berry Hill, Tennessee)
- Genres: Country; Christmas
- Length: 29:27
- Label: RCA Victor
- Producer: Brent Maher

The Judds chronology
Heartland (1987)	Christmas Time with the Judds (1987)	Greatest Hits (1988)

Singles from Christmas Time with the Judds
- 1. "Silver Bells" Released: November 1987

Christmas Time with the Judds is the fourth studio album by American country duo the Judds. It was released on September 29, 1987, by RCA Records. It was produced by Brent Maher. Christmas Time was the duo's first collection of Christmas music released in a full-length album. The album contained nine tracks of holiday material that would later be re-released in the following decades. Having been released 8 months after Heartland, it marked the only time the duo released two albums within the same year.

== Background and content ==
Christmas Time with the Judds would be the duo's fourth studio album and first of Christmas music. By this point, the duo had become one of country music's most successful duo's, having several number one hits and three successful studio albums.

Christmas Time was recorded at the Creative Workshop, located in Nashville, Tennessee. The record was produced by Brent Maher, who had previously produced the Judds's previous three studio offerings. A total of nine tracks were included in the holiday package. Eight of the album's tracks were cover versions of well-known holiday tunes. Songs covered on the album included "Silver Bells," "Winter Wonderland," "Away in a Manger" and "O Holy Night." One new recording was offered as well. The third track, "Who Is This Babe," had not been recorded prior to the album's release. It was composed by Don Potter, who served as the duo's assistant producer on several projects.

== Critical reception ==
Professional ratings
Review scores
Source	Rating
AllMusic	4.5/5 stars

Christmas Time with the Judds received mostly positive reviews following its release. Heather Phares of AllMusic praised the album's cover versions of Christmas tunes, calling them holiday favorites. In conclusion, she stated: "An enjoyable Christmas collection, and a must for fans of the Judds."

In 2018, the album was reviewed by the online publication, Nashville Noise. Writer Gabe Crawford gave the collection a positive response. Crawford called the album's remakes of holiday Christian tunes to be the record's highlights, praising "What Child Is This?" and "Beautiful Star of Bethlehem." Crawford also commented on the duo's harmony vocals, calling them "angelic." "In the rush of the Christmas season, Christmas Time With the Judds is a slow reflection and reminder of what Christmas is really about," he concluded.

== Release and chart performance ==
Christmas Time with the Judds was first released on September 29, 1987, via Curb Records and RCA Records. In its original release, it was offered in several formats: a vinyl LP, audio cassette and compact disc. The album was re-released in 1999 via Curb and Mercury Records, offered as a compact disc.

In its original 1987 release, Christmas Time peaked at number 49 on the Billboard Top Country Albums chart. Then, the album re-charted the same survey in 1988 and reached number 68. The package also charted on the Billboard Top Holiday Albums list. In its original release, Christmas Time peaked at number nine on the holiday albums chart in December 1987. After its 1999 re-issue, it re-charted the same list, peaking at number 36 in January 2000. The album also spawned one single release: "Silver Bells." Upon its original release in November 1987, the single did not chart any Billboard publications. Ten years later, the single made its first appearance on the Hot Country Songs chart, peaking at number 68 in January 1998.

== Track listing ==
=== Vinyl and cassette versions ===
Side one
No.	Title	Writer(s)	Length
1.	"Winter Wonderland"	Felix Bernard; Richard Bernhard Smith	3:44
2.	"Beautiful Star of Bethlehem"	A.L. Philips	3:27
3.	"Who Is This Babe"	Don Potter	3:03
4.	"Santa Claus Is Comin' to Town"	J. Fred Coots; Haven Gillespie	2:50
5.	"Silver Bells"	Ray Evans; Jay Livingston	2:59

Side two
No.	Title	Writer(s)	Length
1.	"What Child Is This?"	Traditional	3:30
2.	"Away in a Manger"	Traditional	2:27
3.	"O Holy Night"	Adolphe Adam; Placide Cappeau	4:00
4.	"Silent Night"	Franz Xaver Gruber; Joseph Mohr	3:15

=== Compact disc version ===
No.	Title	Writer(s)	Length
1.	"Winter Wonderland"	Bernard; Bernhard Smith	3:44
2.	"Beautiful Star of Bethlehem"	Philips	3:27
3.	"Who Is This Babe"	Potter	3:03
4.	"Santa Claus Is Comin' to Town"	Coots; Gillespie	2:50
5.	"Silver Bells"	Evans; Livingston	2:59
6.	"What Child Is This?"	Traditional	3:30
7.	"Away in a Manger"	Traditional	2:27
8.	"O Holy Night"	Adam; Cappeau	4:00
9.	"Silent Night"	Gruber; Mohr	3:15

== Personnel ==
All credits are adapted from the liner notes of Christmas Time with the Judds.

Musical personnel

- Eddie Bayers – drums
- Mark Casstevens – rhythm guitar
- Christ Church Choir – choir
- Sonny Garrish – steel guitar
- Naomi Judd – harmony vocals
- Wynonna Judd – lead vocals
- Middle Tennessee State University Campus School Children's Choir – children's choir
- Craig Nelson – bass
- Bobby Ogdin – piano
- Don Potter – guitar, rhythm guitar, hi-string guitar, autoharp, bandleader
- Cynthia Reynolds Wyatt – harp
- Gene Sisk – piano
- David Schnaufer – dulcimer
- Ricky Skaggs – fiddle
- Jack Williams – bass

Technical personnel

- Barnes and Company – album graphics
- Nancy Boone – choir director
- Landy & Joy Gardner – choir arrangement
- Mary Hamilton – art direction
- Farrell Morris – percussion
- Brent Maher – producer, engineering, mixing
- Glenn Meadows – mastering
- Jim McKell – engineering, mixing
- Mark Prior – photographer

== Charts ==
Chart (1987)	Peak position
US Top Country Albums (Billboard)	49
US Top Holiday Albums (Billboard)	9
Chart (1988)	Peak position
US Top Country Albums (Billboard)	68
Chart (2000)	Peak position
US Top Holiday Albums (Billboard)	36

== Certifications ==
Region	Certification	Certified units/sales
Canada (Music Canada)	Platinum	100,000^{^}
United States (RIAA)	Platinum	1,000,000^{^}
^{^} Shipments figures based on certification alone.

== Release history ==
Region	Date	Format	Label	Ref.
United States	September 29, 1987	Vinyl	Curb Records; RCA Records	
United States	September 29, 1987	Cassette	Curb Records; RCA Records	
United States	September 29, 1987	Compact disc	Curb Records; RCA Records	
Europe	September 29, 1987	Vinyl	Curb Records; RCA Records	
Canada	September 29, 1987	Vinyl	RCA Records	
United States	1999	Compact disc	Curb Records; Mercury Records; Universal Special Products	
United States	October 14, 2003	Compact disc	Curb Records	
United States	November 4, 2006	Music download	Curb Records	
