= Hard Times (Lacy J. Dalton song) =

Single by Lacy J. Dalton

from the album Hard Times
- B-side: "Old Soldier"
- Released: August 30, 1980
- Genre: Country
- Label: Columbia
- Songwriter(s): Bobby Braddock
- Producer(s): Billy Sherrill

Lacy J. Dalton singles chronology
"Losing Kind of Love" (1980)	"Hard Times" (1980)	"Hillbilly Girl with the Blues" (1981)

"Hard Times" is a song written by Bobby Braddock, and recorded by American country music artist Lacy J. Dalton. It was released in August 1980 as the first single and title track from the album Hard Times. The song reached number 7 on the Billboard Hot Country Singles & Tracks chart.

== Chart performance ==
Chart (1980)	Peak position
US Hot Country Songs (Billboard)	7
Canadian RPM Country Tracks	16
