= S-K-O =

US musical group

- Also known as: Schuyler, Knobloch, and Overstreet; Schuyler, Knobloch, and Bickhardt (S-K-B)
- Origin: Nashville, Tennessee, U.S.
- Genre: Country
- Years active: 1986–1989
- Label: MTM
- Past members: J. Fred Knobloch; Paul Overstreet; Thom Schuyler; Craig Bickhardt

S-K-O, originally known as Schuyler, Knobloch and Overstreet, was an American country music vocal group consisting of Thom Schuyler, J. Fred Knobloch, and Paul Overstreet. The original line-up recorded one album for MTM Records and charted three country hits, including the number one "Baby's Got a New Baby". After Overstreet departed in 1987 for a solo career, he was replaced with Craig Bickhardt, and the group was renamed Schuyler, Knobloch, and Bickhardt, or S-K-B for short. The renamed group released one album and four singles before disbanding in 1989.

== Biography ==
Thom Schuyler, J. Fred Knobloch, and Paul Overstreet were three Nashville, Tennessee-based songwriters who got together to form the group in 1986. After the release of their first single, they shortened their name simply to S-K-O. When Overstreet left the group in 1987 to pursue a solo career, he was replaced by Craig Bickhardt and they changed their name to Schuyler, Knobloch & Bickhardt or S-K-B for short. S-K-B disbanded when their record label, MTM Records, shut down in 1989. Since then, Thom Schuyler became the vice president of RCA Nashville (a position from which he retired in 1994), while Knobloch and Bickhardt continued their songwriting careers.

== Discography ==
=== Albums ===
Year	Title	US Country
1986	S-K-O	39
1987	No Easy Horses	52

=== Singles ===
Recording name	Year	Title	Chart Positions		Album
Recording name	Year	Title	US Country	CAN Country	Album
Schuyler, Knobloch & Overstreet	1986	"You Can't Stop Love"	9	—	S-K-O
S-K-O	1986	"Baby's Got a New Baby"	1	—	S-K-O
S-K-O	1987	"American Me"	16	35	S-K-O
Schuyler, Knobloch, and Bickhardt	1987	"No Easy Horses"	19	37	No Easy Horses
Schuyler, Knobloch, and Bickhardt	1987	"This Old House"	24	27	No Easy Horses
Schuyler, Knobloch, and Bickhardt	1988	"Givers and Takers"	8	8	No Easy Horses
Schuyler, Knobloch, and Bickhardt	1988	"Rigamarole"	44	—	Single only

=== Music videos ===
Year	Video	Director
1987	"No Easy Horses"	
1987	"This Old House"	
1988	"Givers and Takers"	
