= You Can't Stop Love (S-K-O song) =

Single by Schuyler, Knobloch & Overstreet

from the album Schulyer, Knobloch & Overstreet
- B-side: "Love Is the Hero"
- Released: July 12, 1986
- Genre: Country
- Length: 3:32
- Label: MTM
- Songwriter(s): Paul Overstreet, Thom Schuyler
- Producer(s): James Stroud

Schuyler, Knobloch & Overstreet singles chronology
"You Can't Stop Love" (1986)	"Baby's Got a New Baby" (1986)

"You Can't Stop Love" is a debut song recorded by American country music group Schuyler, Knobloch & Overstreet. It released in July 1986 as the first single from the album Schuyler, Knobloch & Overstreet. The song reached #9 on the Billboard Hot Country Singles & Tracks chart. The song was written by group members Thom Schuyler and Paul Overstreet.

== Chart performance ==
Chart (1986)	Peak position
US Hot Country Songs (Billboard)	9
