= The Heart (song) =

Single by Lacy J. Dalton

from the album Survivor
- B-side: "Hard Luck Ace"
- Released: January 1989
- Genre: Country
- Label: Universal
- Songwriter(s): Kris Kristofferson
- Producer(s): Jimmy Bowen; James Stroud

Lacy J. Dalton singles chronology
"This Ol' Town" (1987)	"The Heart" (1989)	"I'm a Survivor" (1989)

"The Heart" is a song written and originally recorded by American country music artist Kris Kristofferson on his 1986 album Repossessed. It was covered by American country music artist Lacy J. Dalton on her 1989 album Survivor and released in January 1989 as the album's first single. Dalton's version of the song peaked at number 13 on the Billboard Hot Country Singles chart.

== Chart performance ==
Chart (1989)	Peak position
US Hot Country Songs (Billboard)	13
