= A Little Goes a Long Way =

EP by The Castellows
- Released: February 9, 2024
- Genres: Country; bluegrass
- Length: 22:10
- Label: Warner Records Nashville
- Producer: Trina Shoemaker

Singles from A Little Goes a Long Way
- 1. "No. 7 Road" Released: October 24, 2023; 2. "Hurricane" Released: November 14, 2023

A Little Goes a Long Way is the debut EP by American country music band the Castellows. It was released on February 9, 2024, by Warner Music Nashville. The album was produced by Trina Shoemaker.

The first single from the EP, "No. 7 Road", was released on October 24, 2023.

== Composition ==
Of the seven songs, all six of the group's original songs were written or co-written by group members.

== Track listing ==
A Little Goes a Long Way track listing
No.	Title	Writer(s)	Length
1.	"A Little Goes a Long Way"	Eleanor Balkcom, Lily Balkcom, Powell Balkcom, Natalie Hemby	3:08
2.	"Heartline Hill"	E. Balkcom	2:46
3.	"The Part Where You Break My Heart"	E. Balkcom, L. Balkcom, P. Balkcom, Thomas Rhett, Lydia Vaughan	3:27
4.	"No. 7 Road"	E. Balkcom, L. Balkcom, P. Balkcom, Hillary Lindsey	3:02
5.	"Cowboy Kind of Love"	E. Balkcom, L. Balkcom, P. Balkcom, Parker Welling, Chris LaCorte	3:03
6.	"Hurricane"	Keith Stegall, Stewart Harris, Thom Schuyler	4:09
7.	"I Know It'll Never End"	E. Balkcom, L. Balkcom	2:35
Total length:			22:10

== Personnel ==
The Castellows

- Lily Balkcom – lead vocals
- Eleanor Balkcom – acoustic guitar, background vocals
- Powell Balkcom – banjo, background vocals

Additional musicians

- Jerry McPherson – electric guitar
- Steve Mackey – bass
- Andy Leftwich – fiddle, mandolin
- Jerry Roe – drums, percussion

Production

- Trina Shoemaker – production, mixing, recording
- Pete Lyman – mastering
