= I Know Where I'm Going (The Judds song) =

1987 single by The Judds

Single by The Judds

from the album Heartland
- B-side: "If I Were You"
- Released: April 27, 1987
- Studio: Creative Workshop (Berry Hill, Tennessee)
- Genre: Country
- Length: 3:40
- Label: RCA/Curb
- Songwriter(s): Craig Bickhardt; Brent Maher; Don Schlitz
- Producer(s): Brent Maher

The Judds singles chronology
"Don't Be Cruel" (1987)	"I Know Where I'm Going" (1987)	"Maybe Your Baby's Got the Blues" (1987)

"I Know Where I'm Going" is a song written by Craig Bickhardt, Don Schlitz and Brent Maher, and recorded by American country music duo The Judds. It was released in April 1987 as the second single from the album Heartland. The song was their ninth number one on the country chart. The single went to number one for one week and spent a total of thirteen weeks on the country chart.

== Charts ==
"I Know Where I'm Going" debuted on the U.S. Billboard Hot Country Singles & Tracks for the week of May 9, 1987.

Chart (1987)	Peak position
US Hot Country Songs (Billboard)	1
Canadian RPM Country Tracks	1
