= Whisper (song) =

Single by Lacy J. Dalton

from the album Hard Times
- B-side: "China Doll"
- Released: April 4, 1981
- Genre: Country
- Label: Columbia
- Songwriters: Lacy J. Dalton, Mark Sherrill
- Producer: Billy Sherrill

Lacy J. Dalton singles chronology
"Hillbilly Girl with the Blues" (1981)	"Whisper" (1981)	"Takin' It Easy" (1981)

"Whisper" is a song written by American country music artist Lacy J. Dalton and Mark Sherrill. Dalton recorded the song and it was released in April 1981 as the third and final single from her album Hard Times. The song reached number 10 on the Billboard Hot Country Singles & Tracks chart.

== Chart performance ==
Chart (1981)	Peak position
US Hot Country Songs (Billboard)	10
Canadian RPM Country Tracks	12
