= Hurricane (Leon Everette song) =

1981 single by Leon Everette

Single by Leon Everette

from the album Hurricane
- B-side: "Make Me Stop Loving Her"
- Released: July 13, 1981
- Genre: Urban cowboy, country rock
- Length: 3:22
- Label: RCA
- Songwriter(s): Thom Schuyler; Keith Stegall; Stewart Harris
- Producer(s): Ronnie Dean; Leon Everette

Leon Everette singles chronology
"If I Keep on Going Crazy" (1981)	"Hurricane" (1981)	"Midnight Rodeo" (1981)

"Hurricane" is a song co-written by Thom Schuyler, Keith Stegall, and Stewart Harris. Levon Helm recorded it for his 1980 album American Son. It was later recorded by American country music singer Leon Everette. It was released in July 1981 as the lead single and title track from Everette's album Hurricane. It is Everette's highest-charting single, peaking at No. 4 on the Billboard Hot Country Singles chart in September 1981. Band of Heathens, an American rock band, also charted a rendition of the song in 2011, which has since been certified gold. In 2024, American country trio The Castellows featured a cover of the song on their debut EP A Little Goes a Long Way.

== Content ==
The song is about an old man who lives in the famed New Orleans French Quarter. The man is unfazed when told that a hurricane was about to hit the city; even when "a man from Chicago" claims that the levees need to be raised, he claims that the levees will hold and the man will be "on his way to Illinois".

== Critical reception ==
Jerry Sharpe of The Pittsburgh Press wrote that the song "defeats the standard old formulas for successful country music lyrics — no love story, no sex, no booze, no tragedy." An uncredited review in Billboard said that "Everette's distinctive vocals are the perfect vehicle for this tale of man's struggle against the elements." Dave Marsh was less favorable in The New Rolling Stone Record Guide, calling Everette a "poor man's Johnny Lee" and said the song was "almost an interesting ballad".

== Charts ==
=== Weekly charts ===
Chart (1981)	Peak position
US Hot Country Songs (Billboard)	4
Canadian RPM Country Tracks	3

=== Year-end charts ===
Chart (1981)	Position
US Hot Country Songs (Billboard)	47

== Band of Heathens version ==
"Hurricane"

Single by Band of Heathens

from the album Top Hat Crown & The Clapmaster's Son
- Released: 2011
- Genre: Alternative rock
- Length: 5:19
- Label: BOH
- Songwriter(s): Thom Schuyler, Keith Stegall, Stewart Harris
- Producer(s): George Reiff

American rock band Band of Heathens released a cover of "Hurricane" in 2011 on their album Top Hat Crown & the Clapmaster's Son, reviving interest in the track. It has since charted, reaching number 18 on Hot Rock Songs in 2018. It was certified gold by the Recording Industry Association of America in 2024.

Band of Heathens' version of the song is in A Dorian, following a chord pattern of Am-C-D-Am.
