= Black Coffee (Lacy J. Dalton song) =

- Cassette single cover art

Single by Lacy J. Dalton

from the album Lacy J.
- B-side: "I'm Right Here"
- Released: March 31, 1990
- Genre: Country
- Label: Capitol
- Songwriters: Hillary Kanter, Even Stevens
- Producers: Jimmy Bowen, James Stroud, Lacy J. Dalton

Lacy J. Dalton singles chronology
"Hard Luck Ace" (1989)	"Black Coffee" (1990)	"Where Did We Go Right" (1990)

"Black Coffee" is a song written by Hillary Kanter and Even Stevens, and recorded by American country music artist Lacy J. Dalton. It was released in March 1990 as the first single from her album Lacy J. The song reached number 15 on the Billboard Hot Country Singles & Tracks chart in June 1990.

This was the last of Dalton's singles to chart; as was the case with many other country artists in Dalton's age group, she fell out of favor in the early 1990s as a new generation of performers rose to mainstream prominence.

== Chart performance ==
Chart (1990)	Peak position
Canada Country Singles (RPM)	19
US Hot Country Songs (Billboard)	15
