= Kristen Kelly =

American singer-songwriter

- Born: Waco, Texas
- Origin: Lorena, Texas
- Occupations: Singer, Songwriter
- Instruments: Vocals, Guitar
- Years active: 2012–present
- Label: Arista Nashville
- Website: www.kristenkellymusic.com

Kristen Kelly is an American country music singer from Lorena, Texas. While signed to Arista Nashville she released her debut single, "Ex-Old Man". The song was the first from her self titled ep, produced by Tony Brown and Paul Overstreet. "Ex-Old Man" was the number one most added debut song at country radio for a female artist and was Kelly's first TOP 30 single. Radio Country Universe gave the song a B+, praising the sound as "back-to-basics". It debuted at number 60 on the Hot Country Songs chart dated May 12, 2012.

That same year Kelly was a member of the first class of female artists inducted into CMT's Next Women of Country campaign, which spotlights the newest ladies of country music.

Kelly has played the Grand Ole Opry and toured with some of country music's biggest names including Brad Paisley's 2012 Virtual Reality World Tour Rascal Flatts, Alan Jackson, Sheryl Crow, The Band Perry, Willie Nelson, Gary Allan, Dierks Bentley, Jake Owen and more.

Kelly independently released her FIRE ep in 2015 and has released 3 new singles in 2020: "Ashes" which was on Season 7 episode 1 of the Netflix show The Ranch, "Country Music" featuring Craig Campbell and "Thank God For The Neon."

== Discography ==
=== Studio albums ===
Title	Details
Something Worth Saying, Pt. 2	Release date: November 16, 2021; Label: self-released
Warrior	Release date: February 16, 2024; Label: Sony

==== Extended plays ====
Title	Details
Kristen Kelly	Release date: October 30, 2012; Label: Arista Nashville
Fire	Release date: June 9, 2015; Label: self-released

==== Singles ====
Year	Single	Peak chart positions		Album
Year	Single	US Country	US Country Airplay	Album
2012	"Ex-Old Man"	30	28	Kristen Kelly
2013	"He Loves to Make Me Cry"	—	54	Kristen Kelly
2014	"Kiss by Kiss"	—	—	Fire
2015	"Fire"	—	—	Fire
2020	"Ashes"			—N/a
2020	"Country Music" (featuring Craig Campbell)			—N/a
2020	"Thank God for the Neon"			—N/a
"—" denotes releases that did not chart

==== Music videos ====
Year	Video	Director
2012	"Ex-Old Man"	Anna Mastro
2013	"He Loves to Make Me Cry"	Anna Mastro
2014	"Kiss by Kiss"	Zack Morris
2016	"Fire"	Skylar Sprague
