= Slow Down (Lacy J. Dalton song) =

Single by Lacy J. Dalton

from the album 16th Avenue
- B-side: "One of the Unsatisfied"
- Released: May 1, 1982
- Studio: Columbia Studio A (Nashville, Tennessee)
- Genre: Country
- Label: Columbia
- Songwriter(s): Lacy J. Dalton, Billy Sherrill, Mark Sherrill
- Producer(s): Billy Sherrill

Lacy J. Dalton singles chronology
"Everybody Makes Mistakes" (1981)	"Slow Down" (1982)	"16th Avenue" (1982)

"Slow Down" is a song co-written and recorded by American country music artist Lacy J. Dalton. It was released in May 1982 as the first single from the album 16th Avenue. The song reached number 13 on the Billboard Hot Country Singles & Tracks chart. The song was written by Dalton, Billy Sherrill and Mark Sherrill.

== Chart performance ==
Chart (1982)	Peak position
US Hot Country Songs (Billboard)	13
