= Why Not Me (Fred Knoblock song) =

Single by Fred Knobloch

from the album Why Not Me
- B-side: "Can I Get a Wish"
- Released: 1980
- Genre: Soft rock
- Length: 3:43
- Label: Scotti Brothers
- Songwriter(s): Fred Knobloch; Carson Whitsett
- Producer(s): James Stroud

Fred Knobloch singles chronology
"Why Not Me" (1980)	"Let Me Love You" (1980)

"Why Not Me" is a 1980 single by Fred Knobloch. The song was written by Knobloch along with Carson Whitsett. The song is sung from the point of view of a man attending the wedding of his former girlfriend and sadly wondering why he's not in the groom's position.

"Why Not Me" received its most airplay on adult contemporary radio stations in the United States, spending two weeks at number one on the Billboard Adult Contemporary chart. The single peaked at number eighteen on the Billboard Hot 100 and number thirty on the country singles chart.

== Charts ==
Chart (1980)	Peak position
U.S. Billboard Hot 100	18
U.S. Billboard Adult Contemporary	1
U.S. Billboard Hot Country Singles	30
