= Thom Schuyler =

American songwriter

- Born: Thomas James Schuyler; June 10, 1952 (age 74)
- Origin: Bethlehem, Pennsylvania, U.S.
- Genres: Country
- Occupation: Singer-songwriter
- Instrument: Vocals
- Years active: 1983–present
- Labels: Capitol (solo), MTM (in Schuyler, Knobloch, & Overstreet)
- Formerly of: S-K-O

Thomas James Schuyler (born June 10, 1952) is an American songwriter. Schuyler wrote songs recorded by more than 200 various artists including "16th Avenue" for Lacy J. Dalton, "Love Will Turn You Around" for Kenny Rogers, and "A Long Line of Love" for Michael Martin Murphey.

== Early life ==
Schuyler was born June 10, 1952, in Bethlehem, Pennsylvania. He attended and graduated from Liberty High School, a large public school in Bethlehem.

== Career ==
In 1983, Schuyler was signed by Capitol Records. The same year, he released the album Brave Heart. Its title track was a No. 43 single on the Billboard magazine's Hot Country Singles charts.

He founded the trio S-K-O, originally known as Schuyler, Knobloch & Overstreet, with J. Fred Knobloch and Paul Overstreet. S-K-O charted seven singles in the mid-1980s, including the Number One hit "Baby's Got a New Baby". When Overstreet later pursued a solo career, the trio was renamed S-K-B, and Craig Bickhardt replaced him.

After S-K-B disbanded, Schuyler continued writing songs and was named chairman of the Country Music Association. From 1992 to 1995, he headed RCA Records' Nashville division, where he signed Kenny Chesney, the band Lonestar, and also played role in launching the career of Martina McBride and Sara Evans. Schuyler continued to write songs for Almo-Irving Music, administered several music catalogs, and recorded a few independent albums. In 2011, he was inducted into the Nashville Songwriters Hall of Fame.

Schuyler is currently the Young Adult Minister at a church in Nashville and an adjunct instructor at Belmont University in Nashville.

== Songs written by Thom Schuyler ==
Year	Song	Artist
1980	"Hurricane"	Leon Everette
1980	"Hurricane"	Levon Helm
1982	"Love Will Turn You Around"	Kenny Rogers
1982	"Years After You"	Eddie Rabbitt
1982	"I Don't Know Where to Start"	Eddie Rabbitt
1983	"16th Avenue"	Lacy J. Dalton
1984	"Nothing Like Falling in Love"	Eddie Rabbitt
1985	"My Old Yellow Car"	Dan Seals
1985	"A Long Line of Love"	Michael Martin Murphey
1985	"Years After You"	John Conlee
1985	"I Fell in Love Again Last Night"	The Forester Sisters
1986	"I Want a Love Like That"	Judy Rodman
1986	"You Can't Stop Love"	S-K-O
1987	"Love Out Loud"	Earl Thomas Conley
1987	"This Old House"	SKB
1987	"A Little Bit Closer"	Tom Wopat
1989	"Point of Light"	Randy Travis
1995	"Life Gets Away"	Clint Black
2006	"And It Feels Like"	LeAnn Rimes

== Discography ==
=== Albums ===
Year	Album
1983	Brave Heart
1993	Precious Child (with Craig Bickhardt)
2008	Prayer of a Desperate Man

=== Singles ===
Year	Single	Chart Positions	Album
Year	Single	US Country	Album
1983	"A Little at a Time"	49	Brave Heart
1983	"Brave Heart"	43	Brave Heart
