= Hillbilly Girl with the Blues =

- German release picture sleeve

Single by Lacy J. Dalton

from the album Hard Times
- B-side: "Me 'N' You
- Released: December 13, 1980
- Genre: Country
- Label: Columbia
- Songwriter(s): Lacy J. Dalton
- Producer(s): Billy Sherrill

Lacy J. Dalton singles chronology
"Hard Times" (1980)	"Hillbilly Girl with the Blues" (1980)	"Whisper" (1981)

"Hillbilly Girl with the Blues" is a song written and recorded by American country music artist Lacy J. Dalton. It was released in December 1980 as the second single from the album Hard Times. The song reached number 8 on the Billboard Hot Country Singles & Tracks chart.

== Chart performance ==
Chart (1980–1981)	Peak position
US Hot Country Songs (Billboard)	8
Canadian RPM Country Tracks	10
