= Drink Myself Single =

Single by Sunny Sweeney

from the album Concrete
- Released: October 3, 2011
- Genre: Country
- Length: 2:59
- Label: Republic Nashville
- Songwriters: Sunny Sweeney; Monty Holmes
- Producer: Brett Beavers

Sunny Sweeney singles chronology
"Staying's Worse Than Leaving" (2011)	"Drink Myself Single" (2011)	"Bad Girl Phase" (2014)

"Drink Myself Single" is a song co-written and recorded by American country music singer Sunny Sweeney. It was released in October 2011 as the third single from her album Concrete. Sweeney wrote the song with Monty Holmes.

== History ==
Sweeney co-wrote "Drink Myself Single" with Monty Holmes. She presented him with the idea while the two were drinking wine, and they finished the song in an hour and a half. The song is about a woman who decides to have a night to herself, drinking and having affairs until she has forgotten about her male lover.

== Critical reception ==
Giving it four stars out of five, Bobby Peacock of Roughstock called it "a delightful throwback" to "drinkin' and cheatin'", also comparing the song's sound favorably to Tanya Tucker. An identical rating came from Billy Dukes of Taste of Country, calling the sound "nouveau classic country" and praising Sweeney's voice.

== Chart performance ==
"Drink Myself Single" debuted at number 60 on the US Billboard Hot Country Songs chart for the week dated October 1, 2011. It reached a peak of number 36 in December 2011, giving Sweeney her third Top 40 hit.

== Charts ==
Chart (2011–2012)	Peak position
US Hot Country Songs (Billboard)	36
