= Concrete (Sunny Sweeney album) =

Studio album by Sunny Sweeney
- Released: August 23, 2011
- Genre: Country
- Length: 34:09
- Label: Republic Nashville
- Producer: Brett Beavers

Sunny Sweeney chronology
Heartbreaker's Hall of Fame (2007)	Concrete (2011)	Provoked (2014)

Singles from Concrete
- 1. "From a Table Away" Released: June 28, 2010; 2. "Staying's Worse Than Leaving" Released: May 2, 2011; 3. "Drink Myself Single" Released: October 3, 2011

Professional ratings
Aggregate scores
Source	Rating
Metacritic	71/100
Review scores
Source	Rating
AllMusic	3.5/5 stars
American Songwriter	4/5 stars
The Austin Chronicle	2/5 stars
The A.V. Club	B+
Roughstock	4.5/5 stars
Slant Magazine	4/5 stars

Concrete is the second studio album by American country music singer Sunny Sweeney. It was released on August 23, 2011 via Republic Nashville. The album includes the singles "From a Table Away", "Staying's Worse Than Leaving" and "Drink Myself Single", all of which have charted within the top 40 of Hot Country Songs.

== Reception ==
=== Commercial ===
The album debuted at number 21 on the U.S. Billboard 200 chart upon its release. As of the chart dated September 24, 2011, the album has sold 26,418 copies in the US.

=== Critical ===
Concrete garnered positive reviews from music critics. At Metacritic, which assigns a normalized rating out of 100 to reviews from mainstream critics, the album has an average score of 71 out of 100, which indicates "generally favorable reviews", based on 6 reviews.

Matt Bjorke of Roughstock gave the album four-and-a-half stars out of five, calling it "traditional-minded yet thoroughly modern". AllMusic's Thom Jurek prasied Sweeney's improved songwriting and performance for showcasing her "gifts as a fine lyricist and [a] top flight vocalist with enough restless country soul" throughout the record, concluding that: "Concrete is modern and polished, yet makes no attempt to disguise the influence of the Texas country tradition in its heartfelt performances." Jonathan Keefe of Slant Magazine praised the album for being "full of smart, sharply observed songwriting and winning performances", all while utilizing a "slick and contemporary" soundscape that maintains the "pure twang and fiddle" of traditional country music", concluding that: "Sweeney just gets the economy of country songwriting and the presence that the best country singers possess, and that innate understanding makes Concrete a tremendous, heady record." Blake Boldt of American Songwriter called it "a winning mix of traditional and contemporary: her arrangements are often performed with pedal steel and electric guitar, and the age-old problems of infidelity and heavy drinking are represented with modern twists." Steven Hyden of The A.V. Club wrote: "A far slicker and poppier effort than her 2007 debut Heartbreaker's Hall of Fame, Concrete doesn't water down Sweeney's toughness or the edginess of her feisty, nasally twang."

Country Standard Time critic Karlie Justus noted how the record "combines the authenticity of Sweeney's obvious love of classic country with a current, mainstream edge", concluding that: "Sweeney has crafted a rollicking collection of songs that marry an elusive blend of country's beloved roots with a new sound unique to right here, right now." Jessica Phillips of Country Weekly gave note of Sweeney having similar "tough-chick twang" to Miranda Lambert, saying she is able to "convey heartfelt and complex emotions with one clever turn of a phrase". Phillips concluded that: "She might have a slow burn towards stardom, but if Music City can handle one more tough-and-tender female country singer, Sunny can surely shine in that slot." Conversely, Doug Freeman of The Austin Chronicle was critical of the album's "predictable and trite" musicianship and Sweeney sounding unconvincing throughout the tracks, saying "Concrete is gritty but so watered down by contemporary Nashville arrangements that nothing sticks."

== Track listing ==
No.	Title	Writer(s)	Length
1.	"Drink Myself Single"	Sunny Sweeney; Monty Holmes	2:59
2.	"From a Table Away"	Sweeney; Bob DiPiero; Karyn Rochelle	3:36
3.	"Staying's Worse Than Leaving"	Sweeney; Jay Clementi; Radney Foster	3:24
4.	"The Old Me"	Lori McKenna; Mark D. Sanders	4:04
5.	"Amy"	Sweeney; Brennen Leigh	2:42
6.	"Worn Out Heart"	Sweeney; Brett Beavers	3:00
7.	"Mean as You"	Brett James; Kelley Lovelace; Tim Nichols	3:00
8.	"It Wrecks Me"	Sweeney; Clementi	4:08
9.	"Helluva Heart"	Sweeney; Deanna Bryant; Heather Little	3:09
10.	"Fall for Me"	Lisa Carver; Jaida Dreyer; Carolyn Dawn Johnson	4:07
Total length:			34:09

== Personnel ==
Credits adapted from AllMusic.

- Steve Brewster - drums
- Mike Brignardello - bass guitar
- Bob Britt - electric guitar
- Nicole Broussard - background vocals
- Jimmy Carter - bass guitar
- J.T. Corenflos - electric guitar
- Larry Franklin - fiddle
- Mike Johnson - lap steel guitar
- Greg Morrow - drums
- Mike Rojas - accordion, Hammond B-3 organ, keyboards, piano
- Scotty Sanders - dobro, steel guitar, lap steel guitar
- Bryan Sutton - acoustic guitar
- Sunny Sweeney - lead vocals
- Russell Terrell - background vocals

== Chart performance ==
Chart (2011)	Peak position
US Billboard 200	21
US Billboard Top Country Albums	7
