= J. Fred Knobloch =

American singer-songwriter

- Birth name: James Frederick Knobloch
- Also known as: Fred Knoblock (early 1980s)
- Born: April 28, 1953 (age 71)
- Origin: Jackson, Mississippi, U.S.
- Genres: Country
- Occupation: Singer-songwriter
- Instrument: Vocals
- Years active: 1980–present
- Labels: Scotti Brothers
- Formerly of: S-K-O

James Frederick Knobloch (born April 28, 1953, in Jackson, Mississippi, United States), known as J. Fred Knobloch or Fred Knoblock, is an American country singer-songwriter.

== Career ==
Prior to his solo career, Knobloch had been a member of Let's Eat, a 1970s rock band. Knobloch was signed to Scotti Brothers Records in 1980 when he released the song "Why Not Me", which he wrote along with Carson Whitsett. It reached number 18 on the Billboard Hot 100 singles chart, number 30 on the country chart, and spent two weeks at number one on the Adult Contemporary chart. Later that year he released a duet with Susan Anton, "Killin' Time", which hit number 28 on the Hot 100 and went top ten on the country chart. He had later country hits with "Memphis" and "I Had It All".

In 1986, Knobloch became a member of S-K-O with Paul Overstreet and Thom Schuyler. Knobloch continued to perform as a singer and songwriter into the 2000s. He and Jelly Roll Johnson released the album Live at the Bluebird Cafe in 2000.

His songs have been recorded by The Everly Brothers, Faith Hill, Chely Wright, George Strait, The Wilkinsons, Trisha Yearwood, Confederate Railroad, John Anderson and Sawyer Brown among others.

In 2012, he was inducted into the Mississippi Musicians Hall of Fame.

== Discography ==
=== Albums ===
Year	Album
1980	Why Not Me

=== Singles ===
Year	Single	Peak chart positions				Album
Year	Single	US Country	US	US AC	CAN Country	Album
1980	"Why Not Me"	30	18	1	—	Why Not Me
1980	"Let Me Love You"	53	—	—	—	Why Not Me
1981	"Killin' Time" (with Susan Anton)	10	28	5	39	—
1981	"Memphis"	10	102	28	12	—
1982	"I Had It All"	33	—	—	—	—
"—" denotes releases that did not chart
