= 16th Avenue (song) =

Single by Lacy J. Dalton

from the album 16th Avenue
- B-side: "You Can't Take the Texas Out of Me"
- Released: September 11, 1982
- Recorded: January 1982
- Studio: Columbia Studio A (Nashville, Tennessee)
- Genre: Country
- Length: 3:08
- Label: Columbia
- Songwriter(s): Thom Schuyler
- Producer(s): Billy Sherrill

Lacy J. Dalton singles chronology
"Slow Down" (1982)	"16th Avenue" (1982)	"Dream Baby (How Long Must I Dream)" (1983)

"16th Avenue" is a song written by Thom Schuyler, and recorded by American country music artist Lacy J. Dalton. It was released in September 1982 as the second single and title track from the album 16th Avenue. The song reached number 7 on the Billboard Hot Country Singles & Tracks chart.

In 2007, the song was covered by Sunny Sweeney on her debut album, Heartbreaker's Hall of Fame.

== Content ==
Thom Schuyler said that after he wrote the song, he considered it "too much of an 'industry' kind of song" and had it filed away until a publisher asked if he had any new material. A song plugger then took it to producer Billy Sherrill, who produced Dalton's recording of it. Dalton also sang it at the opening of the 1982 Country Music Association awards telecast.

The location referred to in the song is Music Row in Nashville, which in the 1960s was being changed from residential homes to refurbished office space for the music industry.

== Chart performance ==
Chart (1982–1983)	Peak position
US Hot Country Songs (Billboard)	7
Canadian RPM Country Tracks	13
