= From a Table Away =

Single by Sunny Sweeney

from the album Concrete
- Released: June 28, 2010
- Genre: Country
- Length: 3:38
- Label: Republic Nashville
- Songwriters: Bob DiPiero; Karyn Rochelle; Sunny Sweeney
- Producer: Brett Beavers

Sunny Sweeney singles chronology
"If I Could" (2007)	"From a Table Away" (2010)	"Staying's Worse Than Leaving" (2011)

"From a Table Away" is a song co-written and recorded by American country music artist Sunny Sweeney. It was released on June 28, 2010, as the lead-off single from her album Concrete. The song is Sweeney's fourth single release, although it is her first charted single on the U.S. Billboard Hot Country Songs chart and the U.S. Billboard Hot 100. Sweeney wrote the song with Bob DiPiero and Karyn Rochelle.

== Content ==
"From a Table Away" is a moderate-tempo song, backed primarily by steel guitar and banjo. The song's female narrator describes the scenario of being seated in a restaurant, watching as her love interest has a romantic dinner date with his wife. She confronts her man when he comes home, who acts as if the situation had never happened, but she lets him know that she "saw it all / from a table away." Sweeney co-wrote the song with Bob DiPiero and Karyn Rochelle.

== Critical reception ==
The song has received positive reviews from critics. Bobby Peacock of Roughstock reviewed the song favorably, comparing Sweeney's delivery to Natalie Maines (of the Dixie Chicks) and Miranda Lambert, and complimenting the "simple and traditional" production. Sam Gazdziak of Engine 145 gave the song a thumbs up, describing the song as "unmistakably country, from the prominent steel guitar to the time-honored theme of marital infidelity." He also highlights Sweeney's approach to the song as "sophisticated sadness," drawing comparison to Miranda Lambert's "The House That Built Me."

== Music video ==
The music video premiered on Vimeo on July 21, 2010. In the video, a woman is shown celebrating at a restaurant with her girlfriends, when she notices her man is having a romantic date with someone else at another table. She overhears their conversation and glances over throughout the evening, until she finally has had enough and goes to the restroom, where she sits on the floor trying to contain her sadness. After dinner, she is shown watching from another vehicle as her man and the other woman get into his car and drive away. Additionally, Sunny Sweeney is shown performing the song with her guitar throughout the video. The video was directed by David McClister, and is in all black-and-white.

== Chart performance ==
"From a Table Away" debuted at 58 on the U.S. Billboard Hot Country Songs chart for the week of June 26, 2010, becoming her first song to chart. It also debuted at 96 on the U.S. Billboard Hot 100 for the week of January 22, 2011. In March of that same year, it reached a peak of No. 10 on the U.S. Billboard Hot Country Songs chart.

== Charts ==
Chart (2010–2011)	Peak position
US Hot Country Songs (Billboard)	10
US Billboard Hot 100	71

=== Year-end charts ===
Chart (2011)	Position
US Country Songs (Billboard)	59
