= Staying's Worse Than Leaving =

Single by Sunny Sweeney

from the album Concrete
- Released: May 2, 2011
- Genre: Country
- Length: 3:25
- Label: Republic Nashville
- Songwriters: Jay Clementi; Radney Foster; Sunny Sweeney
- Producer: Brett Beavers

Sunny Sweeney singles chronology
"From a Table Away'" (2010)	"Staying's Worse Than Leaving" (2011)	"Drink Myself Single" (2011)

"Staying's Worse Than Leaving" is a song co-written and recorded by American country music artist Sunny Sweeney. It was released in May 2011 as the second single from her album Concrete. Sweeney wrote the song with Radney Foster and Jay Clementi.

== Content ==
"Staying's Worse Than Leaving" is a moderate-tempo ballad. The song's female narrator describes being in a failed relationship that has gone on for quite some time, because she felt like staying was easier ("Leaving's hard / Trust me it's really bad"). Although she acknowledges that the best option she can do at this point is walk away, because she knows that "staying's worse than leaving."

== Critical reception ==
Matt Bjorke of Roughstock gave the song a three-and-a-half star review, complimenting the song's neo-traditional sound thanks to an "able and rustic production," and favorably compared Sweeney's vocals to Natalie Maines of the Dixie Chicks. Blake Boldt of Engine 145 gave the song a thumbs up rating. He notes that Sweeney's "songs often carry an emotional heft and insight into that little thing called heartache," and favored the song's production, which he believed "puts the stamp on this dying romance."

== Music video ==
The music video, which was directed by Roman White, premiered on CMT on May 19, 2011. In the video, Sweeney and her husband are shown walking around their spacious home separately, both appearing distraught; Sweeney tears up, and the man frequently wrings his hands. At the end of the video, the two finally come together to sleep in the same bed.

== Chart performance ==
"Staying's Worse Than Leaving" debuted at number 60 on the U.S. Billboard Hot Country Songs chart for the week ending May 7, 2011. It ultimately peaked at #38 in August 2011.

== Charts ==
Chart (2011)	Peak position
US Hot Country Songs (Billboard)	38
