= Provoked (Sunny Sweeney album) =

Studio album by Sunny Sweeney
- Released: August 5, 2014
- Recorded: 2013–2014
- Genre: Country
- Length: 47:50
- Label: Thirty Tigers/Aunt Daddy
- Producer: Luke Wooten

Sunny Sweeney chronology
Concrete (2011)	Provoked (2014)	Trophy (2017)

Singles from Provoked
- 1. "Bad Girl Phase" Released: June 16, 2014; 2. "My Bed" Released: February 2015

Provoked is the third studio album by American country music singer Sunny Sweeney. It was released on August 5, 2014, via Thirty Tigers/Aunt Daddy Records. The album includes the singles "Bad Girl Phase" and "My Bed," which were Number One hits on the Texas Music Charts.

== Content ==
After parting ways with Republic Nashville in 2012, Sweeney signed a recording contract with the Thirty Tigers record label, and released Provoked, her first album under the imprint, on August 5, 2014. The set was produced by Luke Wooten and Sweeney co-wrote 11 of the album's 13 songs, many of which were inspired by her personal life, which included a divorce from her first husband.

"Bad Girl Phase" was released in June 2014 as the lead-off single. Although the single failed to reach the Billboard charts, it was a Number One hit on the Texas Music Chart for the chart week of October 20, 2014. In doing so, Sweeney became the first female to top the chart in over ten years.

"Can't Let Go" was previously recorded by Lucinda Williams and Heidi Newfield, and the album also includes a duet with Will Hoge on "My Bed," which was released as the album's second single in early 2015. "My Bed" became a Number One hit on the Texas Music Chart in June 2015, making Sweeney the first female in the history of the chart to score back-to-back Number One hits.

== Reception ==
=== Commercial ===
The album debuted at number 165 on the U.S. Billboard 200 and number 20 on the Billboard Top Country Albums chart upon its release. It had sold 2,900 copies after two weeks.

=== Critical ===
Thom Jurek of allmusic gave the album four stars out of five, praising the record as Sweeney's most consistent and diverse: "It's a provocative album, detailing a difficult journey through disappointment, doubt, darkness, and ultimately triumph. It's chock-full of vulnerability, accountability, an acidic wit and strength." Writing for Cuepoint, the Dean of American rock critics Robert Christgau gave the record an A−. His write-up claimed that Sweeney gave "bros the finger" and that "the former Republic Nashville wannabe" turned "her whole album into what Clark or Jessie Jo Dillon or maybe it was Shannon Wright thought to call 'a bad girl phase.'" Christgau went on to call Sweeney "marketable" and praised her co-writers.

== Track listing ==
No.	Title	Writer(s)	Length
1.	"You Don't Know Your Husband"	Sunny Sweeney; Angaleena Presley; Mark D. Sanders	3:03
2.	"Bad Girl Phase"	Brandy Clark; Jessie Jo Dillon; Shannon Wright	3:22
3.	"Second Guessing"	Sweeney; Natalie Hemby	4:30
4.	"Carolina on the Line"	Sweeney; Lance Miller; Brad Warren; Brett Warren	4:05
5.	"Find Me"	Sweeney; Jay Clementi; Buddy Owens	4:15
6.	"Can't Let Go"	Randy Weeks	3:02
7.	"Front Row Seats"	Sweeney; Miller; Brad Warren; Brett Warren	3:32
8.	"My Bed" (featuring Will Hoge)	Sweeney; Ashley Monroe; Presley	3:24
9.	"Uninvited"	Sweeney; Hemby	3:42
10.	"Sunday Dress"	Sweeney; Monty Holmes; Owens	4:17
11.	"Used Cars"	Sweeney; Hemby	3:58
12.	"Backhanded Compliment"	Sweeney; Hemby	3:33
13.	"Everybody Else Can Kiss My Ass"	Sweeney; Brett Beavers; Connie Harrington	3:00
Total length:			47:50

== Personnel ==
- Isabelle Adams – children's choir
- Molly Bacurin – children's choir
- Jake Clayton – banjo, dobro, cello, fiddle
- Elizabeth Cook – children's choir
- J.T. Corenflos – electric guitar
- Gibb Droll – electric guitar
- Fred Eltringham – drums, percussion
- Michael Hellmer – children's choir
- Will Hoge – duet vocals on "My Bed"
- Joanna Janét – background vocals
- Mike Johnson – lap steel guitar, pedal steel guitar
- Gayle Mayes – background vocals
- Gwen Merrill – children's choir
- Alison Prestwood – bass guitar
- Angela Primm – background vocals
- Mike Rojas – accordion, keyboards, organ
- Steve Sheehan – acoustic guitar
- Hannah Smith – children's choir
- Bryan Sutton – acoustic guitar
- Sunny Sweeney – lead vocals
- Russell Terrell – background vocals
- Emma Wooten – children's choir
- Luke Wooten – electric guitar, kazoo, background vocals

== Chart performance ==
Chart (2014)	Peak position
US Billboard 200	165
US Billboard Top Country Albums	20
US Billboard Independent Albums	25
