= Maybe Your Baby's Got the Blues =

Single by The Judds

from the album Heartland
- B-side: "My Baby's Gone"
- Released: August 17, 1987
- Studio: Creative Workshop (Berry Hill, Tennessee)
- Genre: Country
- Length: 3:32
- Label: RCA/Curb
- Songwriter(s): Graham Lyle; Troy Seals
- Producer(s): Brent Maher

The Judds singles chronology
"I Know Where I'm Going" (1987)	"Maybe Your Baby's Got the Blues" (1987)	"Silver Bells" (1987)

"Maybe Your Baby's Got the Blues" is a song written by Troy Seals and Graham Lyle, and recorded by American country music duo The Judds. It was released in August 1987 as the third single from the album Heartland. The song was their tenth number one on the country chart.

== Charts ==
"Maybe Your Baby's Got the Blues" debuted on the U.S. Billboard Hot Country Singles & Tracks for the week of August 22, 1987.

=== Weekly charts ===
Chart (1987)	Peak position
US Hot Country Songs (Billboard)	1
Canadian RPM Country Tracks	1

=== Year-end charts ===
Chart (1987)	Position
US Hot Country Songs (Billboard)	50
