= Everybody Makes Mistakes (song) =

Single by Lacy J. Dalton

from the album Takin' It Easy
- B-side: "Wild Turkey"
- Released: December 5, 1981
- Genre: Country
- Label: Columbia
- Songwriter(s): Lacy J. Dalton, Mark Sherrill
- Producer(s): Billy Sherrill

Lacy J. Dalton singles chronology
"Takin' It Easy" (1981)	"Everybody Makes Mistakes" (1981)	"Slow Down" (1982)

"Everybody Makes Mistakes" is a song co-written and recorded by American country music artist Lacy J. Dalton. It was released in December 1981 as the second single from the album Takin' It Easy. The song reached number 5 on the Billboard Hot Country Singles & Tracks chart. The song was written by Dalton and Mark Sherrill.

== Chart performance ==
Chart (1981–1982)	Peak position
US Hot Country Songs (Billboard)	5
Canadian RPM Country Tracks	28
