= Takin' It Easy (song) =

Single by Lacy J. Dalton

from the album Takin' It Easy
- B-side: "Golden Memories"
- Released: July 18, 1981
- Genre: Country
- Label: Columbia
- Songwriter(s): Lacy J. Dalton, Billy Sherrill, Mark Sherrill
- Producer(s): Billy Sherrill

Lacy J. Dalton singles chronology
| "Whisper" (1981) | "Takin' It Easy" (1981) | "Everybody Makes Mistakes" (1981) |

"Takin' It Easy" is a song co-written and recorded by American country music artist Lacy J. Dalton. It was released in July 1981 as the first single and title track from the album Takin' It Easy. The song reached number 2 on the Billboard Hot Country Singles & Tracks chart, making it the highest-charting single of Dalton's career. The song was written by Dalton, Billy Sherrill and Mark Sherrill.

== Chart performance ==
| Chart (1981) | Peak position |
|---|---|
| US Hot Country Songs (Billboard) | 2 |
| Canadian RPM Country Tracks | 2 |
