= Anna Mastro =

American film director

- Born: USA
- Occupations: Film, commercial, music video director, and television director, producer, writer
- Years active: 2002–present

Anna Mastro is an American film director, music video director and television producer.

== Biography ==
A native of Seattle, Washington, Mastro graduated from the University of Washington at the age of nineteen. She became a protege to director McG, working as his assistant on the Wonderland Sound and Vision productions Fastlane, Charlie's Angels: Full Throttle and The O.C..

As a television producer, she worked on the reality series Pussycat Dolls Present.

As a music video director, she directed videos for the artists Train, Leona Lewis, Alex Band, Carbon Leaf, Kristen Kelly, Victoria Justice and The Pussycat Dolls. In 2008, she directed the short film Matter starring Amanda Righetti. In 2011, she directed the short film Bench Seat starring Cassie Scerbo and written by Neil LaBute. The film earned a Short Grand Prix nomination at the Warsaw International Film Festival.
