= Trophy (Sunny Sweeney album) =

Studio album by Sunny Sweeney
- Released: March 11, 2017
- Genre: Country
- Length: 35:53
- Label: Aunt Daddy
- Producer: Dave Brainard

Sunny Sweeney chronology
| Provoked (2011) | Trophy (2017) |

Trophy is the fourth studio album by American country music artist Sunny Sweeney, released on March 10, 2017.

== Reception ==
Chuck Dauphin of Sounds Like Nashville reviewed the album favorably, noting the mix of humor and introspection in Sweeney's song choices.

== Track listing ==
| No. | Title | Writer(s) | Length |
|---|---|---|---|
| 1. | "Pass the Pain" | Sunny Sweeney; Jay Clementi; Monty Holmes | 3:43 |
| 2. | "Better Bad Idea" | Sweeney; Galen Griffin; Buddy Owens | 3:16 |
| 3. | "Nothing Wrong with Texas" | Sweeney; Lori McKenna | 3:19 |
| 4. | "Pills" | Brennen Leigh; Noel McKay | 3:12 |
| 5. | "Bottle by My Bed" | Sweeney; McKenna | 3:36 |
| 6. | "Why People Change" | Sweeney; Heather Morgan | 4:02 |
| 7. | "I Feel Like Hank Williams Tonight" | Chris Wall | 3:49 |
| 8. | "Grow Old with Me" | Sweeney; McKenna | 3:22 |
| 9. | "Trophy" | Sweeney; McKenna | 3:39 |
| 10. | "Unsaid" | Sweeney; Caitlyn Smith | 3:50 |
| Total length: | | | 35:53 |

== Personnel ==
Adapted from liner notes.

- Ray Benson – background vocals
- Dave Brainard – acoustic guitar, percussion, keyboards, background vocals
- Jim "Moose" Brown – piano
- Jacob Clayton – fiddle, strings, dobro, cello, acoustic guitar
- Tommy Detamore – steel guitar
- Chris Donahue – bass guitar
- Fred Eltringham – drums
- Shelly Fairchild – background vocals
- Keith Gattis – electric guitar
- Kree Harrison – background vocals
- James Hill – B-3 organ
- Jack Ingram – background vocals
- Joanna Janét – background vocals
- Matt Menefee – banjo
- James Mitchell – electric guitar
- Mickey Raphael – harmonica
- Sunny Sweeney – lead vocals
- Sweepy Walker – harmonica
- Trisha Yearwood – background vocals

== Charts ==
| Chart (2017) | Peak position |
|---|---|
| U.S. Americana/Folk Albums | 20 |
