= Sunny Sweeney =

American singer–songwriter

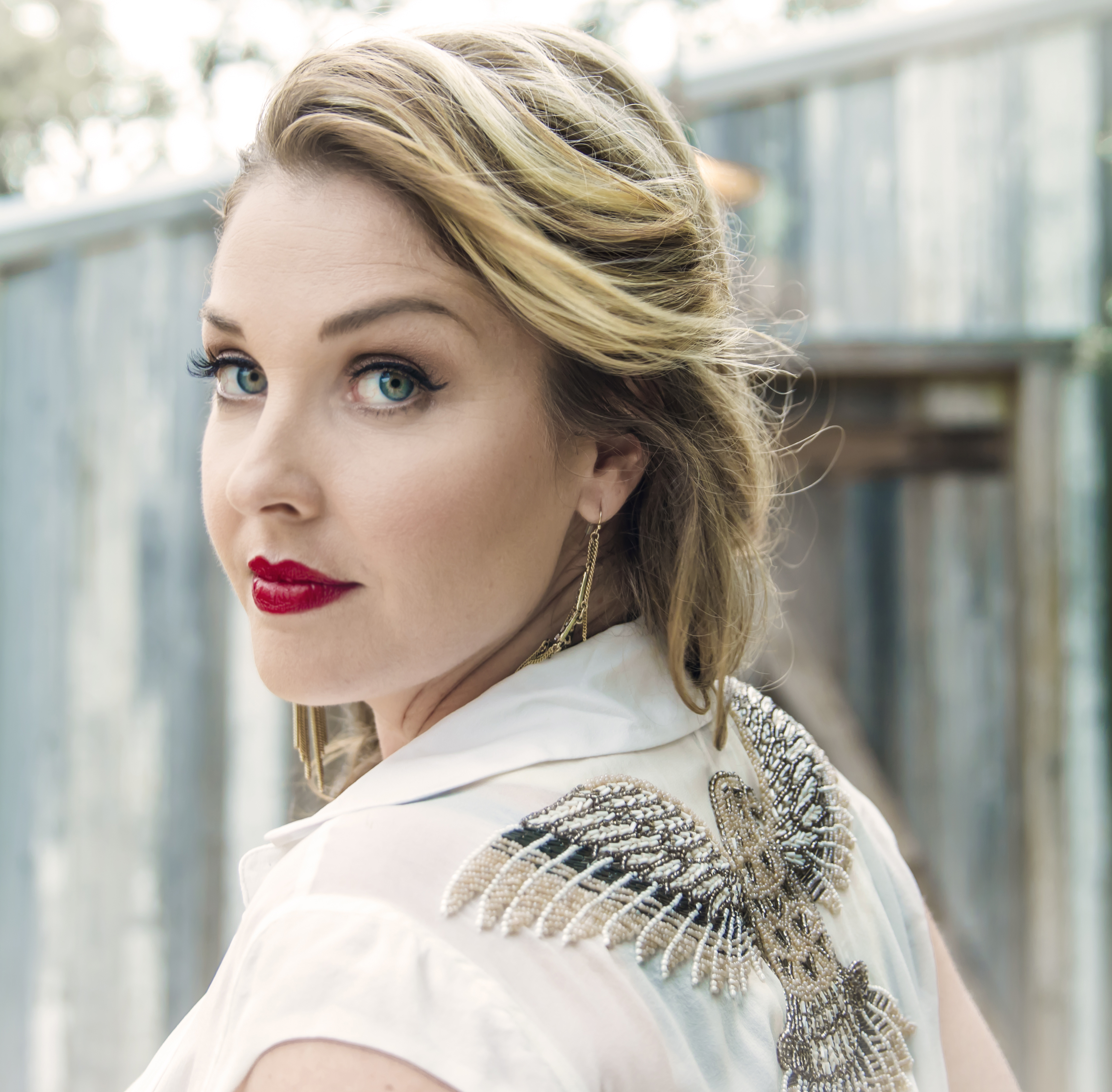
- Sunny Sweeney promotional photo, 2016.
- Born: Sunny Michaela Sweeney; December 7, 1976 (age 49); Longview, Texas, U.S.
- Education: Texas State University
- Occupation: Singer–songwriter
- Years active: 2005–present
- Spouse: 2 marriages, including: Jeff Helmer (m. 2011; div. 2018)
- Musical career
- Genres: Americana; country
- Instruments: Vocals; guitar
- Labels: Big Machine; Republic Nashville; Thirty Tigers; Aunt Daddy
- Website: sunnysweeney.com

Sunny Michaela Sweeney (born December 7, 1976) is an American country singer–songwriter. As of 2026, she has released six studio albums. Her best-selling album was 2011's Concrete, which spawned three charting country singles.

Born and raised in Texas, Sweeney was exposed to music from an early age but did not pursue it professionally. Instead, she attempted an acting and comedy career. She then attended and graduated from Texas State University in 2001. It was after several jobs that Sweeney chose to pursue music professionally. After forming a band and gathering a regional following, her music was heard by Big Machine Records. The label would release her debut studio album, Heartbreaker's Hall of Fame (2007). While its three singles did not find success, it drew attention to Sweeney's career. She was then moved to Republic Nashville, which released her second studio album Concrete. Its lead single, "From a Table Away," reached the top 10 on the US Hot Country Songs chart in 2011.

Sweeney's career shifted toward the Americana genre with her next several releases, which were issued on the independent Thirty Tigers and Aunt Daddy labels. Her 2014 album, Provoked, reached the top 20 of the Billboard Top Country Albums chart and received critical acclaim. It was followed by 2017's Trophy, which made both the American folk and independent albums charts. In 2023, her fifth studio album Married Alone was released.

== Early life ==
Sweeney was born in Longview, Texas. She was the only child born to parents Patrick and Sheila Sweeney. Her biological parents later divorced and remarried new spouses. Sweeney would become close with both her new stepmother and stepfather. Her grandfather, Art Sweeney, was a local musician who played clubs and events near her hometown. He was among her early exposures to music. While surrounded by music, Sunny herself did not perform publicly until singing Dolly Parton's "9 to 5" in her high school talent show. Upon graduating, Sweeney attempted other careers first instead of music.

Sweeney took several junior college courses before moving to New York City to attempt an acting career. After finding little success, she then moved to Austin, Texas, where she joined an improvisational comedy group. While she enjoyed being onstage she did not want to pursue comedy full time. Instead, she attended Texas State University. Commuting five days a week, Sweeney graduated in 2001 with a degree in Public Relations. She then married and worked various jobs. This included a brief stint at a newspaper and a child support agency. While interning for the Propaganda Media music company, Sweeney got opportunities to watch artists perform onstage. After seeing several artists perform onstage, Sweeney realized she could do the same thing. "This guy’s getting paid to do this? I could get paid to do that," she recalled to Lone Star magazine.

== Career ==
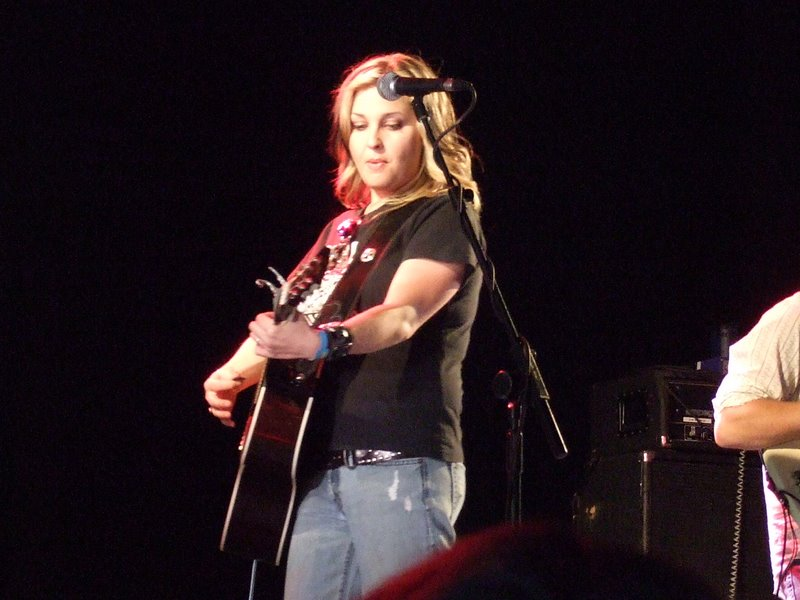
Sunny Sweeney performing.

After college, she started a band and played local bars in Austin and began to branch out and play around Texas. She put out her first album with the production help of Tommy Detamore in March 2006. After gaining a following on the club circuit in her native Texas, Sweeney signed to the independent Big Machine Records label. She also toured throughout Europe in 2007. Her debut album, Heartbreaker's Hall of Fame, was initially self-released in March 2006, and was reissued in March 2007 on Big Machine.

In 2009, Sweeney was signed as the first artist to Republic Nashville, a newly founded joint venture between Big Machine and Universal Republic Records. Her first single for the label is "From a Table Away," which was released on June 28, 2010. It became her first chart single when it debuted at No. 58 on the U.S. Billboard Hot Country Songs chart for the week of June 26, 2010. In March 2011, the song entered the Top 10 of the chart.

Republic Nashville released Sweeney's second studio album, Concrete on August 23, 2011. The album was produced by Brett Beavers consists of ten tracks, including one co-written with Radney Foster and Jay Clementi. "Staying's Worse Than Leaving" and "Drink Myself Single" were released as the album's second and third singles, respectively, and both were minor top 40 hits on the Hot Country Songs chart. Sweeney and Big Machine parted ways in 2012.

In 2013, Sweeney signed a recording contract with the Thirty Tigers record label. Her debut label single entitled "Bad Girl Phase" was released in June 2014. Through the fan-sponsored PledgeMusic program, Sweeney issued her third studio record, Provoked, on August 5, 2014. "My Bed," a duet with Will Hoge, was released in early 2015 as the album's second single.

Dreamer: A Tribute to Kent Finlay, released in early 2016 on Austin-based Eight 30 Records, features Sweeney and Randy Rogers' duet "Between You and Me."

Sweeney's fourth studio album, Trophy, was released on March 10, 2017.

Sweeney released her first live album, Recorded Live At The Machine Shop Recording Studio, on November 13, 2020.

Sweeney's fifth studio album, Married Alone, was released on September 23, 2022. It includes a duet with Vince Gill on the title track as well as vocals from Paul Cauthen on “A Song Can’t Fix Everything.”

Sweeney's sixth studio album, Rhinestone Requiem, was released on August 1, 2025.

== Personal life ==
Sweeney has married and divorced twice. According to Sweeney, her first marriage was "really quick" and when she was "really young." The pair later divorced (her first spouse's name has not been reported). She married Jeff Helmer on November 11, 2011. The pair wed in an intimate ceremony in Las Vegas, Nevada, with only a few friends and family invited. At the time, Helmer was a sergeant with Austin, Texas, police department. He was previously a staff sergeant in the United States Air Force. "He is so supportive and just wants me to be happy and succeed," Sweeney said of the marriage in 2011. The couple attempted to have a child together, resulting in one miscarriage. Sweeney spoke of the miscarriage in 2017: "It makes you feel broken. It seems like no one talks about it, unless they know the person they’re talking to has also been through it." Helmer and Sweeney divorced in 2018, citing her touring schedule for the marriage's end. The pair still remain friends.

== Discography ==
Studio albums

- Heartbreaker's Hall of Fame (2006)
- Concrete (2011)
- Provoked (2014)
- Trophy (2017)
- Married Alone (2022)
- Rhinestone Requiem (2025)

== Awards and nominations ==
Year	Nominee / work	Award	Result	Ref.
2012	Academy of Country Music Awards	New Female Vocalist of the Year	Nominated	
2018	Texas Country Music Association	Female Vocalist of the Year	Nominated	
