= Craig Bickhardt =

American singer-songwriter

- Born: Craig William Bickhardt; September 7, 1954 (age 71)
- Origin: Philadelphia, Pennsylvania, U.S.
- Genres: Country
- Occupation: Singer-songwriter
- Instruments: Vocals, guitar
- Years active: 1984–present
- Labels: MTM (in S-K-B), Stone Barn (solo)
- Formerly of: S-K-B

Craig William Bickhardt (born September 7, 1954) is an American country music singer and songwriter. His musical career includes co-writing credits for the Judds, Steve Wariner, Kathy Mattea and others. He was also a member of S-K-B, formerly S-K-O, after Paul Overstreet exited the band. He has released six studio albums and one live album of his own.

== Early life ==
Bickhardt was born in Philadelphia, Pennsylvania, on September 7, 1954. His father Harry worked at WIP-FM radio in Philadelphia and moonlighted as a big band musician. Craig performed as a local musician during his teenage years, including in a local band called Wire and Wood Band, which opened for Bruce Springsteen and others.

== Career ==
In 1974, he moved to Los Angeles, where he and Michael Sembello began writing songs, some which were recorded by Art Garfunkel. A re-established Wire and Wood Band later recorded for October Records, but never completed an album due to financial challenges.

Bickhardt signed to a publishing contract with EMI in 1982. Among his first musical recordings were two songs for the soundtrack to the 1983 film Tender Mercies, one of which ("You Are What Love Means to Me") charted at No. 86 on the Billboard country singles chart. He also sang background vocals on Reba McEntire's 1984 album, My Kind of Country. From there, he found work as a songwriter, with one of his first cuts being "That's How You Know When Love's Right", which became a Top Ten country hit when Nicolette Larson and Steve Wariner recorded it as a duet. He also co-wrote "You're the Power" along with F.C. Collins for Kathy Mattea, as well as the Judds' Number One hit "I Know Where I'm Going", the latter a collaboration with Don Schlitz and Brent Maher. Bickhardt eventually moved to Nashville, Tennessee. Craig's song Never Been in Love appears on the 1982 Randy Meisner self-titled album.

After Paul Overstreet departed the country music trio S-K-O (formerly Schuyler, Knobloch and Overstreet), Bickhardt was recruited to take Overstreet's place in the trio. As a result, the group was renamed S-K-B (Schuyler, Knobloch and Bickhardt). Bickhardt made his debut on the group's second and final album, 1987's No Easy Horses on MTM Records. This album contained several songs that he co-wrote, including two of its singles: "This Old House" and "Givers and Takers". S-K-B disbanded in 1989 after MTM closed. He continued to write songs for other artists throughout the 1980s, including "Turn It Loose", another Number One hit for the Judds. Other hits he wrote in the 1980s included "If I Never See Midnight Again" by Sweethearts of the Rodeo and "I Can't Turn the Tide" by Baillie & the Boys, the latter of which he co-wrote with lead singer Kathie Baillie and her husband Michael Bonagura.

In 1993, Bickhardt and Thom Schuyler (also formerly of S-K-O) recorded the Christmas music album Precious Child. He continued his songwriting, including hits for Stacy Dean Campbell, Martina McBride, Pam Tillis, and the Kinleys. He also co-wrote for Great Plains, a band which included former Poco member Jack Sundrud. Bickhardt and Sundrud co-wrote Ty Herndon's 1998 Number One hit "It Must Be Love" as well.

Bickhardt returned to recording in 2001 with his first solo album, Easy Fires, released on his own label, Stone Barn Records. In 2006, he returned to his native Pennsylvania and continued to record. A duet album with Sundrud entitled Idlewheel was released that year, followed by a solo album Brother to the Wind in 2009.

He won First Prize in the prestigious 4th Annual IAMA (International Acoustic Music Awards) in 2008 with his song "Sugarcane Street" in the Open category. He also hosted a songwriting workshop in association with the Nashville Songwriters Association International.

On March 12, 2011, Bickhardt appeared with J.D. Malone, Thom Schuyler, for a performance that included original music from all three artists. This tour was called "On the Road and in the Round."

== Personal life ==
Bickhardt lives in Glen Mills, Pennsylvania with his wife, Eileen, and twin children.

== Discography ==
=== Albums ===
- Precious Child (with Thom Schuyler) (1993)
- Easy Fires (2001)
- Idlewheel (with Jack Sundrud) (2006)
- Brother to the Wind (2009)
- Live at Sellersville Theater (2011)
- The More I Wonder (2014)
- Idlewheel Roots & 3 (with Jack Sundrud) (2015) (a reissue of the material from two EPs entitled "The Old Roots" and "Idlewheel 3"
- Idlewheel – Live at Morningstar (with Jack Sundrud) (2015)
- Carrying A Dream (2017) (specialty-merch live album, now out-of-print)
- Home for the Harvest (2018)
- Outpourings (2022)
- Man of Sorrow (with Thom Schuyler) (2025)

=== Digital Singles ===
- In Between Dances (2010)

=== Charting Singles ===
Year	Single	Chart Positions	Album
Year	Single	US Country	Album
1984	"You Are What Love Means to Me"	86	Tender Mercies soundtrack
