= Leon Everette =

American singer

- Born: Leon Everette Baughman; June 21, 1948 (age 77)
- Origin: Aiken, South Carolina, United States
- Genres: Country, country rock, urban cowboy
- Occupation: Singer
- Instrument: Vocals
- Years active: 1977–2010
- Labels: True; Orlando; RCA; Mercury; LightStream

Leon Everette Baughman (born June 21, 1948) is an American country music artist.

== Background ==
He was born in Aiken, South Carolina, United States. While in the Navy during the Vietnam War, Everette won a singing contest and decided to pursue a career in country music. Between 1977 and 1985, Everette recorded eight studio albums, including five for the RCA Nashville label. He charted several singles on the Hot Country Songs charts in the same timespan. Everette reached top 10 on the Hot Country Songs charts with the singles "Over", "Giving Up Easy", "Hurricane", "Midnight Rodeo", "Just Give Me What You Think Is Fair", "Soul Searchin'", "My Lady Loves Me (Just as I Am)" and "I Could'a Had You".

== Discography ==
=== Studio albums ===
Title	Album details	Peak positions
Title	Album details	US Country
Goodbye King of Rock N' Roll	Release date: 1977; Label: True Records	—
I Don't Want to Lose	Release date: August 1980; Label: Orlando Records	61
If I Keep On Going Crazy	Release date: February 1981; Label: RCA Records	56
Hurricane	Release date: November 1981; Label: RCA Records	30
Where's the Fire	Release date: April 1985; Label: Mercury Records	52
"—" denotes releases that did not chart

=== Extended plays ===
Title	Album details	Peak positions
Title	Album details	US Country
Leon Everette	Release date: January 1983; Label: RCA Records	34
Doin' What I Feel	Release date: August 1983; Label: RCA Records	25

=== Singles ===
Year	Single	Peak positions		Album
Year	Single	US Country	CAN Country	Album
1976	"Running State of Mind"	—	—	—
1977	"Goodbye King of Rock N' Roll"	—	—	Goodbye King of Rock N' Roll
1977	"I Love That Woman (Like the Devil Loves Sin)"	84	—	—
1979	"We Let Love Fade Away"	89	—	I Don't Want to Lose
1979	"Giving Up Easy"	81	—	—
1979	"Don't Feel Like the Lone Ranger"	33	—	I Don't Want to Lose
1979	"The Sun Went Down in My World Tonight"	42	—	I Don't Want to Lose
1979	"I Love That Woman (Like the Devil Loves Sin)" (re-recording)	28	—	I Don't Want to Lose
1980	"I Don't Want to Lose"	30	—	I Don't Want to Lose
1980	"Over"	10	—	I Don't Want to Lose
1980	"Giving Up Easy" (re-release)	5	—	If I Keep On Going Crazy
1981	"If I Keep On Going Crazy"	11	16	If I Keep On Going Crazy
1981	"Hurricane"	4	3	Hurricane
1981	"Midnight Rodeo"	9	19	Hurricane
1982	"Just Give Me What You Think Is Fair"	7	4	Leon Everette
1982	"Soul Searchin'"	10	20	Leon Everette
1982	"Shadows of My Mind"	15	6	Leon Everette
1983	"My Lady Loves Me (Just as I Am)"	9	36	Leon Everette
1983	"The Lady, She's Right"	31	29	Doin' What I Feel
1984	"I Could'a Had You"	6	6	Doin' What I Feel
1984	"Shot in the Dark"	30	—	Doin' What I Feel
1985	"Too Good to Say No To"	47	—	Where's the Fire
1985	"A Good Love Died Tonight"	53	—	Where's the Fire
1985	"'Til a Tear Becomes a Rose"	44	—	Where's the Fire
1986	"Danger List (Give Me Someone I Can Love)"	46	—	—
1986	"Sad State of Affairs"	59	—	—
1986	"Still in the Picture"	56	—	—
2010	"United States of America"	—	—	—
"—" denotes releases that did not chart

== Awards and nominations ==
Year	Organization	Award	Nominee/Work	Result
1981	Academy of Country Music Awards	Top New Male Vocalist	Leon Everette	Nominated
