= Lacy J. Dalton =

American country music singer-songwriter (born 1946)

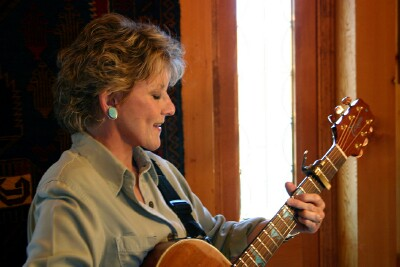
- Dalton in 2005.

Background information
- Also known as: Jill Croston
- Born: Jill Lynne Byrem; October 13, 1946 (age 80)
- Origin: Bloomsburg, Pennsylvania, U.S.
- Genre: Country
- Occupations: Singer, songwriter
- Instruments: Vocals, guitar
- Years active: 1978–present
- Labels: Harbor, Columbia, Universal, Capitol, Liberty, Shop Records, Song Dog
- Website: Official website

Lacy J. Dalton (born Jill Lynne Byrem; October 13, 1946) is an American country music singer and songwriter. She is known for her gritty, powerful vocals, which People Magazine likened to a country equivalent of Bonnie Raitt.

Dalton had a number of hits in the 1980s, including "Takin' It Easy", "Crazy Blue Eyes", and "16th Avenue". Though absent from the U.S. country charts since 1990, she still continues to record and perform, having most recently released three independently recorded albums: Wild Horse Crossing on Shop Records in 1999; The Last Wild Place on Song Dog Records in 2004; and her 2010 self-released Here's To Hank.

When asked about her musical influences, she replied: "Bob Dylan, Joan Baez, Kris Kristofferson, Guy Clark, Waylon Jennings, Willie Nelson, Dolly Parton, Janis Joplin, Robert Johnson, Karen Dalton, Fred Koller, Big Mama Thornton, Billie Holiday, Hank Williams, Tammy Wynette and J. J. Cale."

== Personal life ==
Dalton has taken an interest in saving Nevada's wild horses after she found some of them roaming around Virginia City. In her "Mustang Messenger", Lacy's Let 'em Run Foundation newsletter she writes:

...the New Year will find me attempting to view the restoration of horse slaughter for human consumption in some sort of light that will keep my head from exploding. Our wonderful vet here said "at least they won't be going to Mexico as much, where slaughter methods are unspeakable ... I was moved to write a song which we'll soon share with you on YouTube; for now, here are the lyrics: “ODE TO SLAUGHTERHOUSE SUE AND THE BUTCHERIN’ CREW”

What kind of cowgirl eats horses?
What kind of Rodeo Queen?...
What kind of cowboy eats horses?
When he’s spent his whole life raisin' beef...
