= Marty Stuart discography =

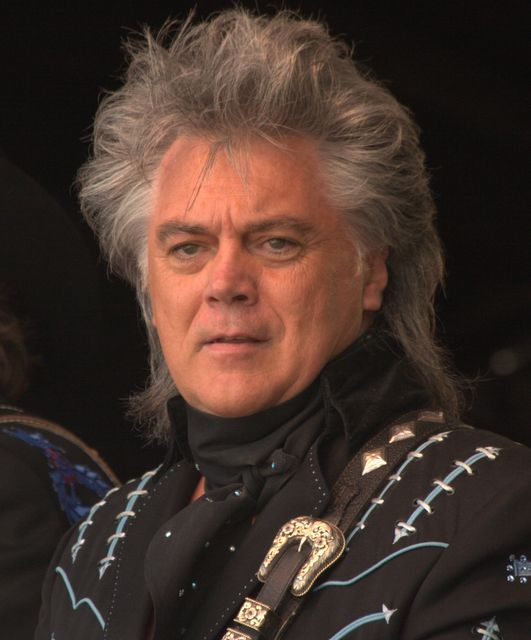
- Marty Stuart at MerleFest in 2012
- Studio albums: 18
- Soundtrack albums: 1
- Live albums: 2
- Compilation albums: 7
- Singles: 33
- Music videos: 28

Marty Stuart is an American country music singer. His discography comprises 18 studio albums, one soundtrack album, two live albums, and various compilation albums, in addition to 33 singles. Stuart has recorded for a variety of record labels, but his most commercially successful period was as a member of MCA Records' roster during the late 1980s and 1990s. Since then, Stuart has mainly released albums through his self-owned label Superlatone Records, often in conjunction with other labels to handle distribution.

== Studio albums ==
=== 1970s and 1980s ===
Title	Album details	Peak positions	Certifications (sales threshold)
Title	Album details	US Country	Certifications (sales threshold)
With A Little Help From My Friends ^{[A]}	Release date: 1978; Label: Ridge Runner	—	
Busy Bee Cafe	Release date: 1982; Label: Sugar Hill Records	—	
Marty Stuart	Release date: 1986; Label: Columbia Records	34	
Hillbilly Rock	Release date: October 17, 1989; Label: MCA Records	19	CAN: Gold; US: Gold
"—" denotes releases that did not chart

=== 1990s ===
Title	Album details	Peak chart positions			Certifications (sales threshold)
Title	Album details	US Country	US	CAN Country	Certifications (sales threshold)
Tempted	Release date: January 22, 1991; Label: MCA Records	20	193	—	CAN: Gold; US: Gold
This One's Gonna Hurt You	Release date: July 7, 1992; Label: MCA Records	12	77	6	CAN: Platinum; US: Gold
Let There Be Country	Release date: August 1992; Label: Columbia Records	—	—	—	
Love and Luck	Release date: March 15, 1994; Label: MCA Records	28	141	6	
Honky Tonkin's What I Do Best	Release date: June 18, 1996; Label: MCA Records	27	196	21	
The Pilgrim	Release date: June 15, 1999; Label: MCA Nashville	63	—	21	
"—" denotes releases that did not chart

=== 2000s, 2010s and 2020s ===
Title	Album details	Peak chart positions			
Title	Album details	US Country	US	US Christ	US Indie
Country Music	Release date: July 1, 2003; Label: Columbia Nashville	40	—	—	—
Souls' Chapel	Release date: August 30, 2005; Label: Superlatone/Universal South	75	—	—	—
Badlands: Ballads of the Lakota	Release date: October 25, 2005; Label: Superlatone/Universal South	—	—	—	—
Cool Country Favorites	Release date: July 2008; Label: Superlatone	—	—	—	—
Ghost Train: The Studio B Sessions	Release date: August 24, 2010; Label: Superlatone/Sugar Hill Records	46	—	—	—
Nashville, Volume 1: Tear the Woodpile Down	Release date: April 24, 2012; Label: Superlatone/Sugar Hill Records	41	—	—	—
Saturday Night / Sunday Morning	Release date: September 30, 2014; Label: Superlatone/Thirty Tigers	24	162	10	29
Way Out West	Release date: March 10, 2017; Label: Superlatone	44	—^{[B]}	—	18
Altitude	Release date: May 19, 2023; Label: Snakefarm				
Space Junk	Release date: April 25, 2025; Label: Snakefarm				
"—" denotes releases that did not chart

== Live albums ==
Title	Album details	Peak positions
Title	Album details	US Bluegrass
Live at the Ryman	Release date: February 7, 2006; Label: Superlatone/Universal South	4
The Gospel Music of Marty Stuart	Release date: April 15, 2014; Label: Superlatone/Gaither Music Group	—
"—" denotes releases that did not chart

== Soundtracks ==
Title	Album details
All the Pretty Horses (Music From the Motion Picture) (with Kristin Wilkinson and Larry Paxton)	Release date: January 16, 2001; Label: Sony Classical Records/Sony Music Soundtrax/Miramax Records

== Album/Book Combos ==
Title	Album details
Country Music: The Masters	Release date: November 1, 2008; Label: Superlatone Productions/Sourcebooks MediaFusion
The Pilgrim: A Wall-To-Wall Odyssey	Release date: November 12, 2019; Label: BMG/MCA Records/Universal Music Special Markets

== Compilation albums ==
Title	Album details	Peak positions	Certifications (sales threshold)
Title	Album details	US Country	Certifications (sales threshold)
Once Upon a Time	Release date: June 9, 1992; Label: CMH Records	—	
The Marty Party Hit Pack	Release date: March 14, 1995; Label: MCA Records	37	US: Gold
20th Century Masters: The Millennium Collection	Release date: January 8, 2002; Label: MCA Nashville	—	
Whiskey and Rhinestones: The Ultimate Collection	Release date: September 29, 2004; Label: Hump Head Records	—	
Compadres: An Anthology of Duets	Release date: June 5, 2007; Label: Superlatone/Hip-O Records	—	
Icon	Release date: August 14, 2012; Label: Universal Music Group	—	
Now That's Country: The Definitive Collection, Vol. 1	Release date: October 6, 2017; Label: Hump Head Records	—	
The Definitive Collection, Vol. 2	Release date: March 29, 2019; Label: Hump Head Records	—	
"—" denotes releases that did not chart

== Singles ==
=== 1980s ===
Year	Single	Peak chart positions		Album
Year	Single	US Country	CAN Country	Album
1985	"Arlene"	19	53	Marty Stuart
1986	"Honky Tonker"	59	—	Marty Stuart
1986	"All Because of You"	39	57	Marty Stuart
1986	"Do You Really Want My Lovin'"	59	51	Marty Stuart
1988	"Mirrors Don't Lie"	56	—	Let There Be Country
1988	"Matches"	66	—	Let There Be Country
1989	"Cry! Cry! Cry!"	32	59	Hillbilly Rock
1989	"Don't Leave Her Lonely Too Long"	42	25	Hillbilly Rock
"—" denotes releases that did not chart

=== 1990s ===
Year	Single	Peak chart positions		Album
Year	Single	US Country	CAN Country	Album
1990	"Hillbilly Rock"	8	6	Hillbilly Rock
1990	"Western Girls"	20	16	Hillbilly Rock
1991	"Little Things"	8	3	Tempted
1991	"Till I Found You"	12	11	Tempted
1991	"Tempted"	5	4	Tempted
1992	"Burn Me Down"	7	12	Tempted
1992	"This One's Gonna Hurt You (For a Long, Long Time)"(with Travis Tritt)	7	6	This One's Gonna Hurt You
1992	"Now That's Country"	18	16	This One's Gonna Hurt You
1992	"High on a Mountain Top"	24	29	This One's Gonna Hurt You
1993	"Hey Baby"	38	31	This One's Gonna Hurt You
1994	"Kiss Me, I'm Gone"	26	23	Love and Luck
1994	"Love and Luck"	54	59	Love and Luck
1994	"That's What Love's About"	68	—	Love and Luck
1995	"The Likes of Me"	58	46	The Marty Party Hit Pack
1995	"If I Ain't Got You"	46	52	The Marty Party Hit Pack
1996	"Honky Tonkin's What I Do Best" (with Travis Tritt)	23	8	Honky Tonkin's What I Do Best
1996	"Thanks to You"	50	—	Honky Tonkin's What I Do Best
1996	"You Can't Stop Love"	26	38	Honky Tonkin's What I Do Best
1997	"Sweet Love"	—	—	Honky Tonkin's What I Do Best
1999	"Red, Red Wine and Cheatin' Songs"	69	73	The Pilgrim
"—" denotes releases that did not chart

=== 2000s and 2010s ===
Year	Single	Peak positions	Album
Year	Single	US Country	Album
2003	"If There Ain't, There Ought'a Be"	41	Country Music (as Marty Stuart and the Fabulous Superlatives)
2003	"Too Much Month (At the End of the Money)"	54	Country Music (as Marty Stuart and the Fabulous Superlatives)
2003	"Farmer's Blues"	—	Country Music (as Marty Stuart and the Fabulous Superlatives)
2010	"Little Heartbreaker (The Likes of You)"	—	Ghost Train (The Studio B Sessions)
2012	"Tear the Woodpile Down" (with Buck Trent)	—	Nashville, Volume 1: Tear the Woodpile Down
"—" denotes releases that did not chart

== Other singles ==
=== Other charted songs ===
Year	Single	Peak positions	Album
Year	Single	US Country	Album
2004	"Even Santa Claus Gets the Blues"	55	A Very Special Acoustic Christmas

=== Guest singles ===
Year	Single	Artist	Peak chart positions		Album
Year	Single	Artist	US Country	CAN Country	Album
1991	"The Whiskey Ain't Workin'"	Travis Tritt	2	4	It's All About to Change
1993	"The Devil Comes Back to Georgia"	Mark O'Connor (with Charlie Daniels, Johnny Cash and Travis Tritt)	54	—	Heroes
1996	"Hope"	Various	57	—	—N/a
1998	"Same Old Train"	Various	59	—	Tribute to Tradition
2000	"Blue Collar Dollar"	Jeff Foxworthy (with Bill Engvall)	63	—	Big Funny
"—" denotes releases that did not chart

== Music videos ==
Year	Title	Director
1985	"Arlene"	
1988	"Mirrors Don't Lie"	Steven Kopels
1989	"Cry, Cry, Cry"	Stephen Buck
1990	"Hillbilly Rock"	Joanne Gardner
1991	"Little Things"	Joanne Gardner
1991	"Tempted"	John Lloyd Miller
1992	"The Whiskey Ain't Workin'" (w/ Travis Tritt)	Gerry Wenner
1992	"This One's Gonna Hurt You (For a Long, Long Time)" (w/ Travis Tritt)	John Lloyd Miller
1992	"Now That's Country"	John Lloyd Miller
1993	"Hey Baby"	John Lloyd Miller
1993	"Dream, Dream, Dream"	Scene Three
1994	"Kiss Me, I'm Gone"	John Lloyd Miller
1994	"Love and Luck"	John Lloyd Miller
1994	"That's What Love's About"	John Lloyd Miller
1995	"Don't Be Cruel" (Live)	Louis J. Horvitz
1995	"The Likes of Me"	Steven Goldmann
1996	"Honky Tonkin's What I Do Best" (w/ Travis Tritt)	Michael Merriman
1996	"Thanks to You"	John Lloyd Miller
1996	"Magic Town"	John Lloyd Miller
1999	"Red, Red Wine and Cheatin' Songs"	John Lloyd Miller
2003	"If There Ain't, There Ought'a Be"	Traci Goudie
2003	"Farmer's Blues" (w/ Merle Haggard)	Deb Haus
2007	"Committed to Parkview" (w/ Porter Wagoner)	Brian Barnes
2009	"The Heartbreak Kind"	Milton Sneed
2017	"Way Out West"	Reid Long
2017	"Torpedo"	Reid Long
2017	"Wait For The Morning (Acoustic)"	
2017	"Time Don't Wait"	
2019	"The Duchess (Queen of the Dixie Line)" (w/ Harry Stinson)	
2021	"I've Been Around"	

=== Guest appearances ===
Year	Video	Director
1981	"The Baron" (Johnny Cash)	
1993	"The Devil Comes Back to Georgia" (w/ Mark O'Connor, Charlie Daniels, Travis Tritt & Johnny Cash)	Gustavo Garzon
1996	"Hope" (Various)	Frank W. Ockenfels III
1998	"Same Old Train" (Various)	Steve Boyle
2000	"Blue Collar Dollar" (w/ Jeff Foxworthy & Bill Engvall)	Thomas Smugala
2001	"Foggy Mountain Breakdown" (Earl Scruggs & Friends)	Gerry Wenner

== Notes ==
- A With A Little Help From My Friends was reissued in 1992 as The Slim Richey Sessions
- B Way Out West reached number 71 on Billboard's United States Top Current Albums chart, which ranks the best-selling recently released albums. It never appeared on the magazine's normal album chart, which includes older releases in addition to current albums.
- C Songs I Sing In The Dark is an acoustic album that is to be released in a song by song fashion, with one new track debuting each month, starting in March 2021. A release date for the entire project has not been announced.
