= Arlyn =

Arlyn or Arlyne may refer to:

== Given name ==
- Arlyn E. Danker (1927–2016), American politician
- Arlyn Phoenix (born 1944), American social activist
- Arlyne Brickman (1934–2020), mafia informant

== Surname ==
- Debra Arlyn (born 1986), American pianist and singer-songwriter

== See also ==
- Aerlyn Weissman (born 1947), two-time Genie Award-winning Canadian documentary filmmaker and political activist
- Arlan (disambiguation)
- Arland (disambiguation)
- Arleen, a feminine name, also spelled Arlene
- Arlen (disambiguation)
- Arlene (disambiguation)
- Aryn (disambiguation)
