= Arlen =

Arlen may refer to:

- Arlen (given name), a list of people
- Arlen (surname), a list of people
- Arlen Realty and Development Corporation, an American real estate investment trust founded in 1959
- Arlen, Texas, a fictional town in the United States, where the animated television series King of the Hill is set

== See also ==
- Arland (disambiguation)
- Arlan (disambiguation)
- Arleen, a feminine name, also spelled Arlene
- Arlyn
