= Aryn =

Aryn may refer to:

== Places ==
- Aryn, the name in the Meadow Mari language of Arino, a village in Morkinsky District, Mari El Republic, Russia

== People with the given name ==
- Aryn Baker (born before 1991), American journalist
- Aryn Kyle (born 1978), American novelist and short story writer
- Aryn Michelle (Aryn Michelle Calhoun, born 1983), American Christian musician
- Aryn Williams (born 1993), Australian professional footballer

== See also ==
- Ariño, a municipality located in the province of Teruel, Aragon, Spain
- Arin (disambiguation)
- Aryan (disambiguation)
