= Arlen (given name) =

Name list

Arlen is a given name. Notable people with the given name include:

- Arlen Erdahl (1931–2023), American politician
- Arlen Escarpeta (born 1981), Belizean actor
- Arlen Harris (born 1980), American football player
- Arlen Lancaster, chief of the United States Department of Agriculture
- Arlen López (born 1993), Cuban boxer
- Arlen Ness (1939–2019), American motorcycle designer
- Arlen Roth (born 1952), American guitarist
- Arlen Siegfreid (1946–2020), American politician
- Arlen Siu (1955–1975), Chinese-Nicaraguan writer
- Arlen Specter (1930–2012), American politician
- Arlen Thompson, drummer of the indie rock group Wolf Parade

== See also ==
- Arlene
- Names of Soviet origin § Marx/Engels/Lenin

== See also ==
- Arlen (surname)
- Arlen (disambiguation)
