= Porter Wagoner discography =

- Studio albums: 53
- Live albums: 3
- Compilation albums: 6
- Singles: 80
- No.1 Single: 3

This is a detailed discography for American country music artist Porter Wagoner. In his 1992 biography A Satisfied Mind: The Country Music Life of Porter Wagoner, Steve Eng estimated that Wagoner had released "at best count...more than eighty albums and numberless singles". By that time Wagoner had released eighty-one Billboard-charting songs, including forty-nine songs that reached the Top 20, twenty-nine songs that reached the Top 10, and fifteen songs that reached the Top 5. Wagoner's writing credits by 1992 included "about 175" songs according to Eng.

Wagoner's albums were released over a span of fifty years, starting with A Satisfied Mind in 1957. After going on a hiatus in the 1990s, Wagoner returned to releasing albums in the 2000s, culminating with the 2007 release of Wagonmaster shortly before his death that same year. Wagoner's material was often re-issued through budget albums released under the RCA Camden label.

== RCA albums (1950s - 1970s) ==
=== RCA Victor albums ===
Credits adapted from pages 445 - 450 of A Satisfied Mind: The Country Life of Porter Wagoner and from various sections of the fifty-eight-part RCA discography published by Both Sides Now Publications.

Title	Details	Peak chart positions	
Title	Details	US Country	US
Satisfied Mind	Release date: February 1957; Label: RCA Victor	—	—
A Slice of Life: Songs Happy 'n' Sad	Release date: February 1962; Label: RCA Victor	—	—
Porter Wagoner and Skeeter Davis Sing Duets (with Skeeter Davis)	Release date: May 1962; Label: RCA Victor	—	—
The Porter Wagoner Show	Release date: 1963; Label: RCA Victor	13	—
Y'All Come	Release date: 1963; Label: RCA Victor	17	—
3 Country Gentlemen	Release date: 1963; Label: RCA Victor	—	—
Porter Wagoner in Person	Release date: 1964; Label: RCA Victor	5	—
The Blue Grass Story	Release date: 1965; Label: RCA Victor	—	—
The Thin Man from West Plains	Release date: 1965; Label: RCA Victor	—	—
The Grand Ole Gospel (with the Blackwood Brothers)	Release date: 1966; Label: RCA Victor	—	—
On the Road: The Porter Wagoner Show	Release date: 1966; Label: RCA Victor	—	—
Confessions of a Broken Man	Release date: 1966; Label: RCA Victor	6	—
Soul of a Convict and Other Great Prison Songs	Release date: 1967; Label: RCA Victor	7	—
The Cold Hard Facts of Life	Release date: 1967; Label: RCA Victor	4	199
More Grand Ole Gospel (with the Blackwood Brothers)	Release date: August 21, 1967; Label: RCA Victor	—	—
The Bottom of the Bottle	Release date: March 15, 1968; Label: RCA Victor	19	—
Porter Wagoner and the Blackwood Brothers Quartet in Gospel Country (with the Blackwood Brothers)	Release date: November 29, 1968; Label: RCA Victor	—	—
The Carroll County Accident	Release date: 1969; Label: RCA Victor	4	161
Me and My Boys	Release date: August 1, 1969; Label: RCA Victor	38	—
You Got-ta Have a License	Release date: 1970; Label: RCA Victor	9	190
Skid Row Joe - Down in the Alley	Release date: 1970; Label: RCA Victor	22	—
Simple As I Am	Release date: 1971; Label: RCA Victor	11	—
Porter Wagoner Sings His Own	Release date: September 1, 1971; Label: RCA Victor	29	—
What Ain't to Be, Just Might Happen	Release date: 1972; Label: RCA Victor	29	—
Ballads of Love	Release date: June 1, 1972; Label: RCA Victor	26	—
Experience	Release date: 1972; Label: RCA Victor	37	—
I'll Keep On Lovin' You	Release date: 1973; Label: RCA Victor	42	—
The Farmer	Release date: 1973; Label: RCA Victor	34	—
Tore Down	Release date: 1974; Label: RCA Victor	28	—
Highway Headin' South	Release date: 1974; Label: RCA Victor	28	—
Sing Some Love Songs, Porter Wagoner	Release date: 1975; Label: RCA Victor	48	—
Porter	Release date: 1977; Label: RCA Victor	—	—
Porter Wagoner Today	Release date: 1979; Label: RCA Victor	—	—
"—" denotes releases that did not chart

=== RCA Camden albums ===
The following albums were released under RCA Victor's budget label, RCA Camden. These albums served as a means of reissuing material that had been previously featured on albums and singles released under the RCA Victor label.

Credits adapted from pages 445 - 450 of A Satisfied Mind: The Country Life of Porter Wagoner and from part fifty-seven of the RCA discography published by Both Sides Now Publications.

Title	Year
A Satisfied Mind	1963
An Old Log Cabin For Sale	1965
"Your Old Love Letters" and Other Country Hits	1966
I'm Day Dreamin' Tonight	1967
Green, Green Grass of Home	1967
Country Feeling	1969
Eddy Arnold, Bobby Bare, Don Gibson, Hank Snow, Porter Wagoner Sing Popular Country Songs	1969
Howdy, Neighbor, Howdy	1970
Porter Wagoner Country	1971
Blue Moon of Kentucky *	1971
The Silent Kind	1973

* Single-disc version issued in 1977 by Pickwick Records.

=== Compilation albums ===
Credits adapted from pages 447, 448, and 450 of A Satisfied Mind: The Country Life of Porter Wagoner, parts eleven and fourteen of the RCA discography published by Both Sides Now Publications, and part two of the RCA Special Products Album Discography also published by Both Sides Now Publications.

Title	Details	Peak chart positions	
Title	Details	US Country	US
The Best of Porter Wagoner	Release date: August 1966; Label: RCA Victor	—	—
The Best of Porter Wagoner, Volume II	Release date: 1970; Label: RCA Victor	31	—
The Best of Porter Wagoner	Release date: 1978; Label: RCA Special Products for I & M Teleproducts	—	—

== 1980s ==
Title	Details	Peak positions
Title	Details	US Country
A Fool Like Me	Release date: 1981; Label: Kaola Records	—
Not a Cloud in the Sky	Release date: 1981; Label: Kaola Records	—
Viva Porter Wagoner	Release date: 1983; Label: Warner Bros./Viva Records	48
Sorrow on the Rocks	Release date: 1989; Label: MCA Records	—
"—" denotes releases that did not chart

== 2000s ==
Title	Details	Peak positions
Title	Details	US Country
The Best I've Ever Been	Release date: 2000; Label: Shell Point Records	—
Unplugged	Release date: 2002; Label: Shell Point Records	—
22 Grand Ole Gospel 2003	Release date: 2003; Label: TeeVee Records	—
Something to Brag About (with Pamela Gadd)	Release date: 2004; Label: TeeVee Records	—
18 Grand Ole Gospel 2005	Release date: 2005; Label: TeeVee Records	—
Gospel 2006	Release date: 2006; Label: TeeVee Records	—
The Versatile	Release date: 2006; Label: TeeVee Records	—
Wagonmaster	Release date: 2007; Label: ANTI-	63
Best of Grand Old Gospel 2008	Release date: 2007; Label: Gusto Records	—
"—" denotes releases that did not chart

== Singles ==
=== 1950s ===
Year	Single	Peak positions	Album
Year	Single	US Country	Album
1954	"Company's Comin'"	7	Satisfied Mind
1955	"A Satisfied Mind"	1	Satisfied Mind
1955	"Eat, Drink and Be Merry (Tomorrow You'll Cry)"	3	Satisfied Mind
1956	"What Would You Do? (if Jesus Came to Your House)"	8	The Porter Wagoner Show
1956	"Uncle Pen"	14	A Slice of Life
1956	"Tryin' to Forget the Blues"	11	Your Old Love Letters
1957	"I Thought I Heard You Calling My Name"	11	A Slice of Life
1959	"Me and Fred and Joe and Bill"	29	An Old Log Cabin for Sale

=== 1960s ===
Year	Single	Peak chart positions			Album
Year	Single	US Country	US	CAN Country	Album
1960	"The Girl Who Didn't Need Love"	26	—	—	Thin Man from the West Plains
1960	"Falling Again"	26	—	—	Country Feeling
1960	"An Old Log Cabin for Sale"	30	—	—	In Person
1961	"Your Old Love Letters"	10	—	—	The Porter Wagoner Show
1962	"Misery Loves Company"	1	—	—	A Slice of Life
1962	"Cold Dark Waters"	10	—	—	I'm Day Dreamin' Tonight
1962	"I've Enjoyed as Much of This as I Can Stand"	7	—	—	The Porter Wagoner Show
1963	"My Baby's Not Here (In Town Tonight)"	20	—	—	In Person
1963	"In the Shadows of the Wine"	29	—	—	The Bottom of the Bottle
1964	"Howdy Neighbor Howdy"	19	—	—	In Person
1964	"Sorrow on the Rocks"	5	—	—	The Thin Man from West Plains
1964	"I'll Go Down Swinging"	11	—	—	The Thin Man from West Plains
1965	"I'm Gonna Feed You Now"	21	—	—	The Thin Man from West Plains
1965	"Green Green Grass of Home"	4	—	—	On the Road
1965	"Skid Row Joe"	3	—	—	The Best
1966	"I Just Came to Smell the Flowers"	21	—	—	Confessions of a Broken Man
1966	"Ole Slew-Foot"	48	—	—	Green, Green Grass of Home
1967	"The Cold Hard Facts of Life"	2	—	—	The Cold Hard Facts of Life
1967	"Julie"	15	—	—	The Cold Hard Facts of Life
1967	"Woman Hungry"	24	—	—	—N/a
1968	"Be Proud of Your Man"	16	—	—	Country
1968	"The Carroll County Accident"^{[A]}	2	92	1	The Carroll County Accident
1969	"Big Wind"	3	—	—	Me and My Boys
1969	"When You're Hot You're Hot"	21	—	6	You Gotta Have a License
"—" denotes releases that did not chart

=== 1970s ===
Year	Single	Peak chart positions			Album
Year	Single	US Country	US	CAN Country	Album
1970	"You Gotta Have a License"	41	—	42	You Gotta Have a License
1970	"Little Boy's Prayer"	43	—	—	You Gotta Have a License
1970	"Jim Johnson"	41	—	42	Simple as I Am
1971	"The Last One to Touch Me"	18	—	13	Simple as I Am
1971	"Charley's Picture"	15	116	10	Simple as I Am
1971	"Be a Little Quieter"	11	—	20	Sings His Own
1972	"What Ain't to Be Just Might Happen"	8	—	10	What Ain't to Be Just Might Happen
1972	"A World Without Music"	14	—	5	Experience
1972	"Katy Did"	16	—	6	Experience
1973	"Lightening the Load"	54	—	61	I'll Keep On Loving You
1973	"Wake Up, Jacob"	37	—	52	The Farmer
1973	"George Leroy Chickashea"	43	—	84	Tore Down
1974	"Tore Down/Nothing Between"	46	—	—	Tore Down
1974	"Highway Headin' South"	15	—	34	Highway Headin' South
1974	"Carolina Moonshiner"	19	—	—	—N/a
1975	"Indian Creek"	96	—	—	—N/a
1976	"When Lea Jane Sang"	66	—	—	—N/a
1977	"I Haven't Learned a Thing" (with Merle Haggard)	76	—	—	Porter
1978	"Mountain Music"	64	—	43	—N/a
1978	"Ole Slew-Foot/I'm Gonna Feed 'Em Now"	31	—	51	Today
1979	"I Want to Walk You Home"	34	—	43	—N/a
1979	"Everything I've Always Wanted"	32	—	—	—N/a
1979	"Hold On Tight"	64	—	—	Porter Wagoner
"—" denotes releases that did not chart

=== 1980s–2000s ===
Year	Single	Peak chart positions		Album
Year	Single	US Country	CAN Country	Album
1980	"Is It Only Cause You're Lonely"	84	—	—N/a
1982	"Turn the Pencil Over"	53	—	—N/a
1983	"This Cowboy's Hat"	35	43	Viva
2007	"Committed to Parkview"	—	—	Wagonmaster
"—" denotes releases that did not chart

== Other singles ==
=== Guest singles ===
Year	Single	Artist	Peak positions
Year	Single	Artist	US Country
1967	"Chet's Tune"	Some of Chet's Friends	38
1985	"One Big Family"	Heart of Nashville	61

== Music videos ==
Year	Video
2007	"Committed To Parkview"

== Notes ==
- A "The Carroll County Accident" also peaked at number 80 on the RPM Top Singles chart in Canada.

== See also ==
- Porter Wagoner and Dolly Parton discography
