= Arleen =

- Pronunciation: /ˈɑːrliːn/
- Gender: Female
- Language: Celtic, Irish

Origin
- Word/name: English

Arleen or Arlene is an Irish feminine given name and variant of Carlene or Charlene and in the French derived from feminine diminutive of Charles (meaning free man).

== Given name ==
- Arlene The Housewife, a female wrestler from Gorgeous Ladies of Wrestling
- Arlene Agus (1949–2024), American Orthodox Jewish feminist and activist
- Arlene Alda (born 1933), American musician, photographer, and writer
- Arlene Arcillas (born 1969), city mayor of Santa Rosa, Laguna
- Arleen Auger (1939–1993), American soprano, admired for her coloratura voice and interpretations of works by Bach, Handel, Haydn, Monteverdi, Gluck, and Mozart
- Arlene Blencowe (born 1989), mixed martial artist and boxer
- Arlene Brosas (born 1976), Filipino educator, child rights activist, and politician
- Arlene Chai (born 1955), Filipino-Chinese-Australian author
- Arlene Dahl (1925–2021), American actress
- Arleen Day (1949–2012), Canadian curler from Regina, Saskatchewan
- Arlene Eisenberg (1934–2001), American author
- Arline Fisch (born 1931), American artist and educator
- Arlene Foster (born 1970), Northern Irish politician who has been a Member of the Legislative Assembly for Fermanagh and South Tyrone since 2003
- Arlene Francis (1907–2001), American actress and game show panelist
- Arlene Golonka (1936–2021), American actress
- Arleene Johnson (1924–2017), Canadian former infielder who played from 1945 through 1948 in the All-American Girls Professional Baseball League
- Arline Judge (1912–1972), American actress-singer
- Arline Burks Gant, director, actress, and costume designer
- Arlene Harris (1896–1976), Canadian-born American radio, film, and television actress
- Arlene Howell (born 1939), American television actress
- Arlene Hutton, American playwright, theatre artist, and teacher
- Arlene Klasky (born 1949), American artist
- Arlene Martel (1936–2014), American actress
- Arlene Phillips (born 1943), professional dancer and theatre choreographer
- Arlene Pieper, the first woman to officially finish a marathon in the United States, which occurred in 1959
- Arlene Pileggi (born 1952), American actor
- Arlene Sanford, American film and television director
- Arleen Schloss (1943–2026), American performance artist
- Arlene Semeco (born 1984), freestyle swimmer
- Arlene Anderson Skutch (1924–2012), singer, actress, and painter
- Arleen Sorkin (1955–2023), American actress
- Arleen Whelan (1916–1993), American film actress
- Arlene Williams (1946–2017), TV host
- Arlene Xavier (born 1969), volleyball player
- Arleen de Haan (born 2012), Korfball player

== Fictional characters ==
- Arlene, a character in the movie 13 Going on 30
- Arlene, a fictional character in Garfield
- Arlene Joseph, a character in the 1998 Canadian-American independent film Smoke Signals

== See also ==
- "Arlene" (song), the 1985 debut single by American country music artist Marty Stuart
