= Arin =

Arin may refer to:

== Geography ==
- Arin, Armenia, a town in Armenia
- Arin River, a tributary of the Someşul Mare River in Romania
- Ujjain, an Indian city used as the center of ancient and medieval world maps, which was corrupted in Latin as Arin

== People ==
- Arin Hanson (born 1987), American internet personality, voice actor, songwriter, rapper, animator, and cartoonist
- Arın Soğancıoğlu (born 1987), Turkish basketball player
- Arin Wright (born 1992), American soccer player
- Suha Arin (1942–2004), Turkish film director, writer, producer and educator
- Arin (singer), stage name of South Korean singer Choi Ye-won (born 1999)

== Other uses ==
- Arin (Ninjago), a character in Ninjago
- Arin language, an extinct Yeniseic language
- American Registry for Internet Numbers (ARIN), the regional internet registry for Canada, the United States, and many Caribbean and North Atlantic islands

== See also ==
- Arino, a village in Morkinsky District, Mari El Republic, Russia
- Ariño, a municipality located in the province of Teruel, Aragon, Spain
- Aryn (disambiguation)
