= You Can't Stop Love =

You Can't Stop Love may refer:

== Music ==
- "You Can't Stop Love" (S-K-O song), 1986 song by S-K-O
- "You Can't Stop Love" (Marty Stuart song), 1996 song by Marty Stuart
