= Souls' Chapel =

Soul's Chapel

Studio album by Marty Stuart & His Fabulous Superlatives
- Released: August 30, 2005
- Genre: Country, Gospel
- Length: 47:35
- Language: English
- Label: Superlatone

Marty Stuart chronology
Country Music (2003)	Soul's Chapel (2005)	Badlands: Ballads Of The Lakota (2005)

Souls' Chapel is American country singer Marty Stuart's 12th studio album, and his second album with his band, the Fabulous Superlatives, released in 2005. This is also Stuart's second concept album (with The Pilgrim being his first). With this project, Stuart and his Superlatives devote the entire album to gospel songs. The album also features select songs in which Stuart's lead vocal performances are unprominent, and are showcased instead by those of the Superlatives' fellow members: 'Cousin' Kenny Vaughan (guitar), 'Handsome' Harry Stinson (drums) and 'Brother' Brian Glenn (bass). The album also features a guest appearance from Mavis Staples on the track 'Move Along Train'.

== Track listing ==
No.	Title	Writer(s)	Length
1.	"Somebody Saved Me"	Roebuck Staples	3:48
2.	"Lord, Just Give Me a Little More Time"	Albert E. Brumley	3:36
3.	"Way Down"	Marty Stuart, Harry Stinson	3:29
4.	"Come Into The House of the Lord"	Marty Stuart, Kenny Vaughan	4:07
5.	"The Gospel Story of Noah's Ark"	Marty Stuart, Jerry Sullivan	6:29
6.	"I Can't Even Walk (Without You Holding My Hand)"	Colbert Croft, Joyce Croft	3:53
7.	"It's Time to Go Home"	Marty Stuart	3:26
8.	"The Unseen Hand"	A.J. Sims	5:09
9.	"There's a Rainbow (At The End of Every Storm)"	Marty Stuart, Harry Stinson	2:59
10.	"Slow Train"	Steve Cropper, William Bell	3:16
11.	"Move Along Train"	Roebuck Staples	3:41
12.	"Souls' Chapel"	Marty Stuart	3:42

== Personnel ==
=== Marty Stuart & His Fabulous Superlatives ===
- Brian Glenn - bass guitar, vocals
- Harry Stinson - drums, vocals
- Marty Stuart - acoustic guitar, electric guitar, vocals
- Kenny Vaughan - electric guitar, vocals

=== Additional Musicians ===
- Barry Beckett - Hammond organ
- Chad Cromwell - drums
- Paul Griffith - drums
- Tony Harrell - Hammond organ
- Michael Rhodes - bass guitar
- Mavis Staples - vocals
- Glenn Worf - bass guitar

== Awards ==
The album was nominated for a Dove Award for Country Album of the Year at the 37th GMA Dove Awards.

== Chart performance ==
Chart (2005)	Peak position
U.S. Billboard Top Country Albums	75
