= Skutch =

Skutch is a surname. Notable people with the surname include:

- Alexander Skutch (1904–2004), American naturalist and writer
- Arlene Anderson Skutch (1924-2012), singer, actress and painter
- Ira Skutch, American television producer: DuMont Television Network and other networks, Match Game and other shows
- Robert Skutch and Judith Skutch Whitson, American first copyrighters of A Course in Miracles

== See also ==
- Skutsch
