= Out West =

Out West may refer to:

- Out West (magazine), published in Los Angeles between 1894 and 1935
- Out West (1918 film), American comedy two-reeler starring Fatty Arbuckle and Buster Keaton
- Out West (1947 film), American comedy two-reeler starring The Three Stooges
- Out West (album), 2005 double-album by English indie rock band Gomez
- "Out West" (song), 2020 American single by Travis Scott and Young Thug
- Out West (The Ren & Stimpy Show), an episode of the American TV series The Ren & Stimpy Show

== See also ==
- Western United States
- Way Out West (disambiguation)
- Out of the West, 1926 American Western film
