= Way Out West (Marty Stuart album) =

Studio album by Marty Stuart & His Fabulous Superlatives
- Released: March 10, 2017
- Language: English
- Label: Superlatone
- Producer: Mike Campbell

Marty Stuart chronology
Saturday Night / Sunday Morning (2014)	Way Out West (2017)

Way Out West is American country music singer Marty Stuart's 18th studio album released in 2017. The album was produced by Tom Petty and the Heartbreakers guitarist Mike Campbell.

== Track listing ==
No.	Title	Writer(s)	Length
1.	"Desert Prayer - Part I"	Marty Stuart	0:48
2.	"Mojave"	Chris Scruggs, Harry Stinson, Marty Stuart, Kenny Vaughan	2:18
3.	"Lost On The Desert"	Dallas Frazier, Buddy Mize	2:34
4.	"Way Out West"	Marty Stuart	5:42
5.	"El Fantasma Del Toro"	Harry Stinson	2:46
6.	"Old Mexico"	Marty Stuart	2:46
7.	"Time Don't Wait"	Marty Stuart, Gene Clark	3:56
8.	"Quicksand"	Kenny Vaughan	1:44
9.	"Air Mail Special"	Charles Christian, Benny Goodman, James Mundy	2:17
10.	"Torpedo"	Kenny Vaughan	2:17
11.	"Please Don’t Say Goodbye"	Harry Stinson, Marty Stuart	2:48
12.	"Whole Lotta Highway (With A Million Miles To Go)"	Marty Stuart	3:19
13.	"Desert Prayer - Part II"	Chris Scruggs, Harry Stinson, Marty Stuart, Kenny Vaughan	0:57
14.	"Wait For The Morning"	Brian Glenn Nolf, Harry Stinson, Marty Stuart, Kenny Vaughan	3:50
15.	"Way Out West (Reprise)"	Chris Scruggs, Harry Stinson, Marty Stuart, Kenny Vaughan	1:56

== Personnel ==
=== Marty Stuart & His Fabulous Superlatives ===
- Chris Scruggs - bass guitar, vocals
- Harry Stinson - drums, vocals
- Marty Stuart - acoustic guitar, electric guitar, vocals
- Kenny Vaughan - electric guitar, vocals
