= Arlan =

Arlan may refer to:

== Given name ==
- Arlan (Indonesian politician) (born 1975), Indonesian politician from South Sumatra
- Arlan Andrews (born 1940), American engineer and science fiction author
- Arlan Hamilton, American venture capitalist
- Arlan Lerio (born 1976), Filipino boxer
- Arlan Meekhof (born 1959), American politician from Michigan
- Arlan Richardson, American medical professor
- Arlan Stangeland (1930–2013), American politician from Minnesota

== Places ==
- Arlan, Krasnokamsky District, Republic of Bashkortostan
- Mount Arlan, a mountain in Turkmenistan
- Aralan, a village in northern Iran

== Other ==
- Aironet ARLAN, a family of wireless networking technologies
- Arlan Kokshetau, a Kazakhstani hockey club
- Arlan's, an American discount store chain
- Arlan, a playable character in Honkai: Star Rail

== See also ==
- Arland (disambiguation)
