= Way Out West =

Way Out West may refer to:

== Film and television ==
- Way Out West (1937 film), starring Laurel and Hardy
- Way Out West (1930 film), a 1930 American comedy film
- "Way Out West" (Sliders), a television episode

== Music ==
- Way Out West (duo), an English electronic music duo from Bristol
- Way Out West (jazz group), an Australian jazz group from Melbourne
- Way Out West (festival), a three-day music festival in Gothenburg, Sweden

=== Albums ===
- Way Out West (Richard Davis album), 1980
- Way Out West (Sonny Rollins album), 1957
- Way Out West (Mae West album), 1966
- Way Out West (Way Out West album), 1997, by the above English duo
- Way Out West (Marty Stuart album), a 2017 album by Marty Stuart
- Way Out West, Italian issue of Sixteen Tons of Bluegrass, a 1966 album by Pete Stanley and Wizz Jones

=== Songs ===
- "Way Out West" (song), a 1973 song by The Dingoes
- "Way Out West", a song by The Cooper Temple Clause from See This Through and Leave
- "Way Out West", a song by Kurtis Blow from Kurtis Blow
- "Way Out West", a song by Andrew Bird's Bowl of Fire from The Swimming Hour
- "Way Out West", a song by Big Star from Radio City
- "Way Out West", a song that was featured in the 1991 film An American Tail: Fievel Goes West
- "Way Out West", a folk song by Mary McCaslin
