= Arlene =

Arlene may refer to:

- Arleen, a feminine name, also spelled Arlene
- "Arlene" (song), the 1985 debut single by American country music artist Marty Stuart
- Arlene, a Beanie Baby cat produced by Ty, Inc.
- List of storms named Arlene, the name of several tropical cyclones in the Atlantic Ocean
- Arlene, a cat character in the Garfield cartoon series.
- Arlene, Michigan, unincorporated community
