= Busy Bee Cafe =

Studio album by Marty Stuart
- Released: 1982
- Genre: Country
- Language: English
- Label: Sugar Hill Records
- Producer: Marty Stuart

Marty Stuart chronology
| With A Little Help From My Friends (1978) | Busy Bee Cafe (1982) | Marty Stuart (1986) |

Busy Bee Cafe is the second solo album of American country singer Marty Stuart, released in 1982. Unlike his debut solo album, this project contains original material by Stuart, including the title track, 'Boogie For Clarence' and 'Long Train Gone'.

The album also pays tribute to the people with whom Stuart honed his craft as a musician; with songs written by Lester Flatt, Earl Scruggs, Bill Monroe, and Johnny Cash (Cash appears as a guest performer on 'One More Ride', 'Hey Porter' and 'Get In Line, Brother'), as well as Stuart's own 'Boogie For Clarence', which was written for country guitar icon Clarence White. Stuart would later record another tribute to White on his 2010 album Ghost Train: The Studio B Sessions with the instrumental track 'Hummingbyrd', which was recorded with White's Fender Telecaster which he purchased from Clarence's daughter. Michelle Jason Ankeny of Allmusic praised the album as "a loose, jam-oriented record".

== Track listing ==
| No. | Title | Writer(s) | Length |
|---|---|---|---|
| 1. | "One More Ride" (duet with Johnny Cash) | Bob Nolan | 3:15 |
| 2. | "Blue Railroad Train" | Alton Delmore | 2:25 |
| 3. | "I Don't Love Nobody" | Traditional, arranged by Lester Flatt | 2:20 |
| 4. | "Watson's Blues" | Bill Monroe | 3:18 |
| 5. | "Busy Bee Cafe" | Marty Stuart | 3:48 |
| 6. | "Down The Road" | Flatt, Earl Scruggs | 1:32 |
| 7. | "Hey Porter" (duet with Johnny Cash) | Johnny Cash | 2:48 |
| 8. | "Boogie For Clarence" | Marty Stuart | 3:00 |
| 9. | "Get In Line, Brother" (duet with Johnny Cash) | Flatt | 2:22 |
| 10. | "Soldier's Joy" | Traditional, arranged by M. Christian | 2:02 |
| 11. | "Long Train Gone" | Marty Stuart | 3:15 |

== Personnel ==
- Johnny Cash - rhythm guitar and duet vocals on tracks 1, 7, and 9
- T. Michael Coleman - bass guitar
- Jerry Douglas - dobro
- Jack Grochmal - percussion
- Carl Jackson - banjo, rhythm guitar, background vocals
- Alan O'Bryant - background vocals
- Earl Scruggs - banjo, background vocals
- Marty Stuart - rhythm guitar, mandolin, lead vocals
- Doc Watson - rhythm guitar, harmonica
- Merle Watson - rhythm guitar, slide guitar
