= Arlen (surname) =

Arlen is a surname. Notable people with the surname include:

- Harold Arlen (1905–1986), American musical composer
- Margaret Arlen, American talk show host
- Michael Arlen (1895–1956), Armenian novelist and short story writer
- Richard Arlen (1899–1976), American actor
- Walter Arlen (1920–2023), Austrian-born American composer

== See also ==
- Arlen (given name)
- Arlen (disambiguation)
