= Live at the Ryman (Marty Stuart album) =

Live album by Marty Stuart & His Fabulous Superlatives
- Released: February 7, 2006
- Genre: Country, Bluegrass
- Length: 48:04
- Language: English
- Label: Superlatone
- Producer: Marty Stuart; Harry Stinson

Marty Stuart chronology
Badlands: Ballads of the Lakota (2005)	Live at the Ryman (2006)	Compadres: An Anthology of Duets (2007)

Live at the Ryman is American country singer Marty Stuart's 15th album. This album is significant as it is the first (and so far, only) album composed of entirely live performances.

== The Accidental album ==
Marty Stuart had just finished his tour with Merle Haggard, The Old Crow Medicine Show and his wife, Connie Smith. The tour, dubbed the 'Electric Barnyard Tour' was designed to bring a show to what Haggard called "the forgotten people" (poor people in small towns across rural America). However, due to incredibly hot weather, the tour was unsuccessful at the box office, which left Stuart feeling distraught. He then was even more disappointed to be reminded that almost a year earlier, he had agreed to perform a bluegrass show at the Ryman Auditorium. He was not at all in the mood to create any more music for a while, but nonetheless called up bluegrass legends Charlie Cushman, "Uncle" Josh Graves and Stuart Duncan, as well as the iconic announcer and radio D.J. Eddie Stubbs. The performers met at the Ryman on the afternoon of the concert, and spent no more than twenty minutes choosing their songs and rehearsing them. They knew they had no time to learn anything new, so agreed on "marquee level songs with a built in fun factor". Stuart was then informed that the concert had sold out, which gave him a much needed boost of confidence. On the walk from the dressing room to the stage, Stuart commented to Charlie Cushman that he "hated being thought of as an unrehearsed, half-assed bluegrass band", to which Cushman replied "Why don't we just go out there and play music and not worry about calling it anything?" The concert proved to be a success, and after leaving the stage, Les Banks handed Stuart two CDs and told him that he should listen to it. Stuart was amazed to find that his performance that evening had been recorded. Upon listening to it, he knew that it was a special performance, and consequently the concert was released as a live album.

== Track listing ==
No.	Title	Length
1.	"Eddie Stubbs Intro"	0:55
2.	"Orange Blossom Special"	3:47
3.	"No Hard Times Blues"	4:39
4.	"Homesick"	4:52
5.	"Shuckin' The Corn"	3:07
6.	"The Whiskey Ain't Workin' Anymore"	2:44
7.	"Mr. John Henry (Intro)"	0:15
8.	"Mr. John Henry, The Steel Drivin' Man"	3:11
9.	""Uncle" Josh's Intro"	0:40
10.	"Train 45"	3:59
11.	"Josh's Joke"	0:40
12.	"The Great Speckled Bird"	1:53
13.	"Sure Wanna Keep My Wine"	3:26
14.	"Walk Like That"	5:20
15.	"Hillbilly Rock"	3:21

== Personnel ==
=== Musicians ===
As listed in liner notes

- Marty Stuart – mandolin, acoustic guitar, vocals
- Kenny Vaughan – acoustic guitar, vocals
- Harry Stinson – snare drum, vocals
- Brian Glenn – bass guitar, vocals
- Stuart Duncan – fiddle
- Charlie Cushman – banjo
- Josh Graves – Dobro, vocals

=== Production ===
- Les Banks – recording
- Harry Stinson – editing and mixing
- Jim DeMain – Mastering
- Maria-Elena Orbea – production coordination
