= Honky Tonkin's What I Do Best =

Studio album by Marty Stuart
- Released: June 18, 1996
- Recorded: 1995–96
- Studio: Sound Emporium (Nashville, Tennessee)
- Genre: Country
- Length: 38:44
- Label: MCA Nashville
- Producer: Tony Brown; Justin Niebank

Marty Stuart chronology
| The Marty Party Hit Pack (1995) | Honky Tonkin's What I Do Best (1996) | The Pilgrim (1999) |

Professional ratings
Review scores
| Source | Rating |
|---|---|
| AllMusic | 2.5/5 stars |
| Entertainment Weekly | A− |
| The Village Voice | (choice cut) |

Honky Tonkin's What I Do Best is the ninth studio album by American country music artist Marty Stuart, released on June 18, 1996, by MCA Nashville. Four singles were released from this album, and they were the title track, "Thanks to You", "You Can't Stop Love", and "Sweet Love". The album peaked at #27 on the Top Country Albums chart in the United States, and #21 on the Canadian albums chart.

== Track listing ==
| No. | Title | Writer(s) | Length |
|---|---|---|---|
| 1. | "Honky Tonkin's What I Do Best" (duet with Travis Tritt) | Marty Stuart | 3:01 |
| 2. | "Country Girls" | Stuart, Paul Kennerley | 2:27 |
| 3. | "Thanks to You" | Stuart, Gary Nicholson | 3:18 |
| 4. | "Shelter from the Storm" | Stuart, Kostas | 3:39 |
| 5. | "Sweet Love" | Del Shannon | 3:21 |
| 6. | "I'll Be There for You" | Stuart | 4:12 |
| 7. | "The Mississippi Mudcat and Sister Sheryl Crow" (feat. Jimmy Martin and his country music coon dogs and beagle hounds) | Stuart | 3:31 |
| 8. | "Rocket Ship" | Stuart, Kennerley | 3:11 |
| 9. | "Country" | Roger Murrah, Marcus Hummon | 2:49 |
| 10. | "You Can't Stop Love" | Stuart, Kostas | 4:01 |
| 11. | "So Many People" | Roger D. Ferris | 3:32 |

== Personnel ==
- Steve Arnold - bass guitar, background vocals
- Barry Beckett - Hammond organ
- Mike Brignardello - bass guitar
- Mark Casstevens - acoustic guitar
- Brad Davis - acoustic guitar, electric guitar
- Stuart Duncan - fiddle, mandolin
- Gary Hogue - steel guitar
- Roy Huskey Jr. - upright bass
- Kirk "Jelly Roll" Johnson - harmonica
- Paul Kennerley - acoustic guitar
- Larry Marrs - background vocals
- Jimmy Martin - vocals on "The Mississippi Mudcat and Sister Sheryl Crow"
- Steve Nathan - synthesizer
- Herb Pedersen - background vocals
- Michael Rhodes - bass guitar
- Matt Rollings - Hammond organ, piano
- Gary Smith - piano
- Steuart Smith - 12-string guitar, electric guitar, electric sitar
- Gregg Stocki - drums
- Marty Stuart - Dobro, acoustic guitar, electric guitar, mandolin, slide guitar, lead vocals, background vocals
- Travis Tritt - vocals on "Honky Tonkin's What I Do Best"
- Steve Turner - drums
- Biff Watson - acoustic guitar

== Chart performance ==
=== Album ===
| Chart (1996) | Peak position |
|---|---|
| U.S. Billboard Top Country Albums | 27 |
| U.S. Billboard 200 | 196 |
| Canadian RPM Country Albums | 21 |

=== Singles ===
| Year | Single | Peak positions | |
| Year | Single | US Country | CAN Country |
|---|---|---|---|
| 1996 | "Honky Tonkin's What I Do Best" (with Travis Tritt) | 23 | 8 |
| 1996 | "Thanks to You" | 50 | — |
| 1997 | "You Can't Stop Love" | 26 | 38 |
| 1997 | "Sweet Love" | — | — |
