= Ghost Train: The Studio B Sessions =

Studio album by Marty Stuart & His Fabulous Superlatives
- Released: August 24, 2010
- Genre: Country
- Language: English
- Label: Sugar Hill Records
- Producer: Marty Stuart

Marty Stuart chronology
| Cool Country Favorites (2008) | Ghost Train: The Studio B Sessions (2010) | Nashville, Volume 1: Tear the Woodpile Down (2012) |

Ghost Train: The Studio B Sessions is the 17th studio album of country music singer Marty Stuart. The album was long-awaited by fans of Stuart, as most of the songs had already featured on The Marty Stuart Show, Stuart's country/bluegrass show on RFD-TV. It was recorded in the historic RCA Studio B in Nashville, which was being used by the Country Music Hall of Fame as a type of museum until Stuart asked to use the "Home of a Thousand Hits" to record 'Ghost Train'.

== Content ==
The album has a neo-traditionalist approach to country music, an indication from Stuart that he and his Superlatives intend to carry on with their more serious approach to recording, a direct contrast to Stuart's earlier days of performing.

=== Branded ===
'Branded' is a song about a man who is constantly on the run; he has been jailed for vagrancy (amongst other crimes). He claims he is "guilty of the crime of tryin' to get back home." The song is, in sorts, a tribute to Merle Haggard who had a hit single on the country charts with the song "Branded Man" in 1967. The song is a reminder of 1970's country rock. Stuart had the idea to write the song whilst in his dressing room at the Grand Ole Opry, and had to "keep getting out of the shower" every time a new line came into his head.

=== Country Boy Rock & Roll ===
'Country Boy Rock & Roll' was originally a bluegrass tune by the group Reno & Smiley. Marty heard the song on the radio in his tour bus, and immediately fell in love with the tune, deciding that upon his next visit to the recording studio he would record an electric version with the Superlatives. The song is performed as a duet between Marty Stuart and his lead guitarist, "Cousin" Kenny Vaughan.

=== Drifting Apart ===
'Drifting Apart' is a song about two lovers who are, as the title suggests, drifting apart from each other. Stuart got the idea for the song whilst in the car with his wife, Connie Smith. He told her to take a pen and paper and write down as he dictated to her: "Our home is like a prison, where we're both serving time/I'm a stranger in your world now, and it's driving me out of my mind./Drifting apart, drifting apart, darling, we're drifting apart./Out of reach, out of heart, we're slowly drifting apart." Stuart later joked in an interview that he had to reassure his partner that the song was not about her.

=== Bridge Washed Out ===
'Bridge Washed Out' was originally written and recorded by Warner Mack in 1965. It would also be recorded a year later by country legend George Jones. Mack's version spent a week at the top spot and all in all enjoyed twenty-two weeks on the chart. Stuart has often performed his rendition of this song on his TV show, and his choosing to record it for this album is symbolic of him tipping his hat to traditional country music, whilst still embracing modern methods of recording and playing.

=== A World Without You ===
'A World Without You' is a slow ballad-type song, co-written by Stuart with his wife. It is the type of song that Smith would be more expected to sing, as it requires a strong vocal ability; Stuart admitted on his show in 2010 "I can't sing like her... but she can't play the mandolin as good as I can!". In singing this type of song, Stuart demonstrates how his vocal talents have developed as he has grown older.

=== Hummingbyrd ===
'Hummingbyrd' is an electric instrumental composed by Stuart. It is designed as a tribute to Clarence White, and performed on White's electric guitar, which White's wife sold to Stuart some years after White's death.

=== Hangman ===
'Hangman' is one of the more somber songs on the album. It tackles the inner demons of a hangman, trying to cope with being responsible for a countless number of deaths. It is also significant as it was co-written with musical icon Johnny Cash four days before his death, as a result making it the last song that Cash ever wrote. Stuart said that this was a prime example of Harlan Howard's description of country music as being "nothing but three chords and the truth".

=== Ghost Train Four-Oh-Ten ===
'Ghost Train Four-Oh-Ten', the title track of the album, is a twelve-bar blues song, about a mystical train that carries "sad souls, bound for nowhere". The idea for the song was inspired by an old train depot in Stuart's home town of Philadelphia, Mississippi. In the liner notes Stuart talks about how he can often be found alone at the depot, simply thinking or daydreaming.

=== Hard Working Man ===
'Hard Working Man' is another song inspired by the legacy of Merle Haggard, and references one of Haggard's hits ("In better times, in old America/We sang the Working Man's Blues with such pride"). The song was inspired by a mixture of elements, one of which being the worldwide recession, another of which dates back to Stuart's childhood - his father was fired from his company that he had devoted his life to just before retiring, so that the company would not have to pay him his benefits upon retirement. Stuart dedicated the song to his father, and said it was also meant for everyone else who has been a victim of "corporate greed."

As the song is written much in the style of Merle Haggard, Stuart decided to show it to him before recording it. He said that "Showing Hag a new song is like showing Mount Rushmore your rock collection... but he liked it, and he gave me his blessing".

=== I Run To You ===
'I Run To You' is a duet featuring Marty Stuart and his wife Connie Smith; it was also written by the couple. The couple have written many songs together in the past "the most notable being 'Farmer's Blues', Stuart's duet with Merle Haggard), yet this is only the second time that they have recorded together (with 'Hearts Like Ours' being the first). This track has the largest arrangement on the album, with a heavy steel guitar presence alongside a string quartet, which was arranged by Stuart's drummer, "Handsome" Harry Stinson.

=== Crazy Arms ===
'Crazy Arms' was written by steel guitar legend Ralph Mooney, and has been recorded by many artists, including Ray Price, Webb Pierce, Jerry Lee Lewis and Willie Nelson. Unlike previous versions, this recording is purely instrumental, with Stuart and his Superlatives playing alongside Mooney's steel guitar. The track also features a spoken introduction in the form of a conversation between Stuart and Mooney.

=== Porter Wagoner's Grave ===
'Porter Wagoner's Grave' is Marty Stuart's farewell song to his long-time friend Porter Wagoner. Shortly before Wagoner's death, Stuart and his Superlatives helped him get back on top of his career by recording his final album Wagonmaster. When he died, Stuart tried to ease the pain by writing. What started out as a piece of prose eventually became the song 'Porter Wagoner's Grave'. Stuart claimed that he never intended for the general public to hear any of it, but his bandmembers insisted that the song was too well-written to not perform.

The song is about a man who enters a cemetery for shelter at nighttime, and is visited by a silver-haired phantom, who advises him to go back to the one he loves before it is too late. The phantom was described as wearing a "long purple coat, covered in wheels/red leather boots, with sparkling heels"; an accurate description of Wagoner and his fondness of rhinestone suits.

=== Little Heartbreaker (The Likes Of You) ===
'Little Heartbreaker (The Likes Of You)' is a song co-written by Marty Stuart and Ralph Mooney. Stuart cites his co-writer in the song, in the line "Gonna call old Moon, get a little unwound/Go to Mississippi, then a Texas town".

=== Mississippi Railroad Blues ===
'Mississippi Railroad Blues' is another instrumental track, and the final song on the album. It is a mandolin instrumental composed by Stuart, and is a showcase for his talent on the mandolin.

== Track listing ==
| No. | Title | Writer(s) | Length |
|---|---|---|---|
| 1. | "Branded" | Marty Stuart | 3:37 |
| 2. | "Country Boy Rock & Roll" (Duet with Kenny Vaughan) | Don Reno | 2:53 |
| 3. | "Drifting Apart" | Marty Stuart | 3:02 |
| 4. | "Bridge Washed Out" | Warner Mack | 2:27 |
| 5. | "A World Without You" | Marty Stuart, Connie Smith | 3:06 |
| 6. | "Hummingbyrd" | Marty Stuart | 3:21 |
| 7. | "Hangman" | Marty Stuart, Johnny Cash | 3:43 |
| 8. | "Ghost Train Four-Oh-Ten" | Marty Stuart | 3:20 |
| 9. | "Hard Working Man" | Marty Stuart | 3:04 |
| 10. | "I Run To You" (Duet with Connie Smith) | Marty Stuart, Connie Smith | 4:05 |
| 11. | "Crazy Arms" (Featuring Ralph Mooney) | Ralph E. Mooney, Charles P. Seals | 1:39 |
| 12. | "Porter Wagoner's Grave" | Marty Stuart | 4:09 |
| 13. | "Little Heartbreaker (The Likes of You)" | Marty Stuart, Ralph E. Mooney | 3:39 |
| 14. | "Mississippi Railroad Blues" | Marty Stuart | 1:30 |

== Chart performance ==
| Chart (2010) | Peak position |
|---|---|
| U.S. Billboard Top Country Albums | 46 |

== Personnel ==
As listed in liner notes

=== Musicians ===
- Marty Stuart - lead vocals, acoustic guitar, electric guitar, mandolin
- Kenny Vaughan - lead vocals (on track 2), acoustic guitar, electric guitar, high-string guitar
- Harry Stinson - harmony vocals (on tracks 1, 3, 4, 5, 9, 13), drums
- Paul Martin - harmony vocals (on tracks 1, 3, 4, 5, 9), electric bass, upright bass, TAC, piano
- Ralph Mooney - steel guitar, spoken introduction on track 11
- Kayton Roberts - steel guitar
- Gary Carter - steel guitar
- Tommy White - steel guitar
- Hargus "Pig" Robbins - piano
- Karen Winkelmann - violin
- Pamela Sixfin - violin
- Sarighani Reist - cello
- Monisa Angell - viola
- Connie Smith - vocals
- Louis Dean Nunley - vocals
- Robby Turner - steel guitar
- Fred Newell - steel guitar

=== Production ===
The album was recorded, mixed and mastered by Mick Conley at the historic RCA Studio B in Nashville, Tennessee and the Clubhouse at Inlight in Hendersonville, Tennessee. Assisted by Josh Sumrall, Jake Jorgovan, Eric Thompson, Michael Hardesty, Stephen Turney and Matt Kraatz. Maria-Elena Orbea was the production coordinator.
