= Ayreland =

Ayreland may refer to:

- Burn of Ayreland, a coastal stream on Mainland Orkney, Scotland, draining to the Clestrain Sound
- Mill of Ayreland, an historic watermill driven by water force of the Burn of Ayreland
