= Arlan, Krasnokamsky District, Republic of Bashkortostan =

Arlan Арлан
- Selo
- Location within Bashkortostan Location within Russia
- Coordinates: 55°58′N 54°14′E
- Country: Russia
- Region: Bashkortostan
- District: Krasnokamsky District
- Time zone: UTC+5:00

Arlan (Bashkir and Russian: Арлан) is a rural locality (a selo) and the administrative centre of Arlansky Selsoviet, Krasnokamsky District, Bashkortostan, Russia. The population was 755 as of 2010. There are 15 streets.

== Geography ==
Arlan is located 22 km south of Nikolo-Beryozovka (the district's administrative centre) by road. Mozhary is the nearest rural locality.
