= Country Music (Marty Stuart album) =

Studio album by Marty Stuart & His Fabulous Superlatives
- Released: July 1, 2003
- Genre: Country
- Length: 40:34
- Language: English
- Label: Columbia
- Producer: Justin Niebank

Marty Stuart chronology
The Pilgrim (1999)	Country Music (2003)	Souls' Chapel (2005)

Country Music is the 11th studio album of American country singer Marty Stuart, released in 2003. With his previous album The Pilgrim, Stuart established himself as a serious recording artist and an accomplished musician. For this album he formed a new backing band called the Fabulous Superlatives. To date, Marty and his Superlatives are still touring and recording. They also performed as the backing band of The Marty Stuart Show on RFD-TV.

The members of the band are:

- 'Cousin' Kenny Vaughan - Guitar
- 'Handsome' Harry Stinson - Drums
- 'Brother' Brian Glenn - Bass (who would later be replaced by 'The Apostle' Paul Martin, who was subsequently replaced by 'Professor' Chris Scruggs)

Though the album was a commercial success, Stuart later claimed he was unhappy with the album, and said he was "guilty of trying to have a hit".

The track "Too Much Month (At The End of the Money)" was originally recorded by the writers of the song (Bob DiPiero, Dennis Robbins, and John Scott Sherrill) when they formed the band Billy Hill. Their version was a hit in 1989 and it was the only Top 40 hit for them, it peaked at No. 25 on the charts and it was released as their debut single and lead off single to their album "I Am Just a Rebel".

== Track listing ==
No.	Title	Writer(s)	Length
1.	"A Satisfied Mind"	Jack Rhodes, Joe Hayes	3:35
2.	"Fool for Love"	Marty Stuart, Tom Douglas	4:13
3.	"If There Ain't There Oughta Be"	Bobby Pinson, Trey Bruce	2:55
4.	"Here I Am"	Rivers Rutherford	3:32
5.	"Sundown in Nashville"	Dwayne Warwick	3:06
6.	"By George"	Marty Stuart	2:55
7.	"Farmer's Blues" (duet with Merle Haggard)	Marty Stuart, Connie Smith	3:18
8.	"Wishful Thinkin'"	Mike Henderson, Wally Wilson	3:10
9.	"If You Wanted Me Around"	Marty Stuart, Paul Kennerley	2:38
10.	"Too Much Month (At The End of the Money)"	Bob DiPiero, Dennis Robbins, John Scott Sherrill	2:16
11.	"Tip Your Hat"	Jeffrey Steele	4:25
12.	"Walls of a Prison"	John R. Cash	4:31

== Personnel ==
=== Marty Stuart & His Fabulous Superlatives ===
- Brian Glenn - background vocals
- Harry Stinson - drums, tambourine, background vocals
- Marty Stuart - fiddle, acoustic guitar, electric guitar, mandolin, lead vocals
- Kenny Vaughan - acoustic guitar, electric guitar

=== Additional Musicians ===
- Tommy Douglas - background vocals
- Stuart Duncan - fiddle
- Brian Glenn - background vocals
- Josh Graves - dobro
- Merle Haggard - duet vocals on "Farmer's Blues"
- Tony Harrell - accordion, clavichord, Hammond organ, piano
- Russ Pahl - banjo, steel guitar
- Alison Prestwood - bass guitar
- Michael Rhodes - bass guitar
- Earl Scruggs - banjo
- Robby Turner - steel guitar

== Chart performance ==
Chart (2003)	Peak position
U.S. Billboard Top Country Albums	40
