= Kenny Vaughan =

American singer-songwriter

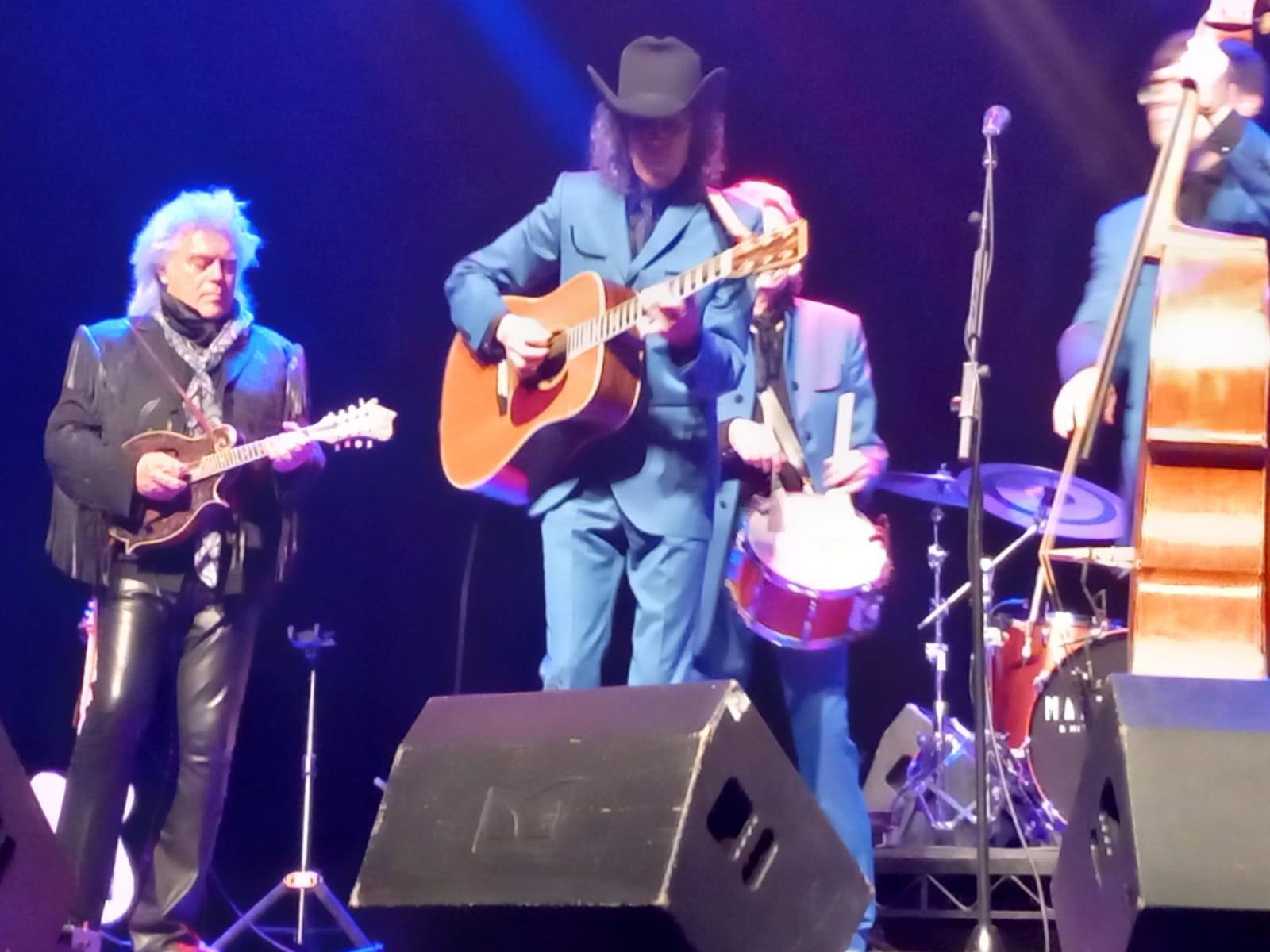
- Vaughan (second from left) playing with Marty Stuart (left) in 2022

Background information
- Born: Kenneth Weber Vaughan; Bartlesville, Oklahoma
- Genres: Country; rockabilly; rock and roll
- Occupations: Musician; songwriter
- Instruments: Vocals; guitar
- Years active: 1971–present
- Label: Sugar Hill
- Member of: The Fabulous Superlatives
- Formerly of: Jonny III; McBride & the Ride
- Spouse: Carmella Ramsey

Kenneth Weber Vaughan is an American guitarist. He is best known as a long-time member of Marty Stuart’s supporting band, The Fabulous Superlatives.

== Career ==
=== Early life ===
Vaughan was born in Oklahoma, but raised in Denver, Colorado. His guitar instructor was Bill Frisell. In the late 1960s, Vaughan played in a number of rock bands in the nearby Littleton, Colorado, area (where he lived), including a progressive rock group called Amos. Soon after, Vaughan joined a local progressive jazz band, and then began playing country music in local bars.

Vaughan was a member of the Colorado punk band Jonny III in the late 1970s and early 80s. This band started Vaughan's partnership with his long-time songwriting partner Jeffrey Leroy Smith, better known as Leroy X. He moved to Nashville in the 1980s, where he became known as a country music guitarist.

Along with Greg Garing, Vaughan was in part responsible for the revitalization of Nashville's historic Lower Broadway district. They drew crowds of listeners while playing in the back room of Tootsie's.

Vaughan was briefly a member of McBride & the Ride in 1994, and later, of Trent Summar & the New Row Mob.

=== Touring and recording ===
Vaughan has been a member of Marty Stuart’s Fabulous Superlatives since its inception in 2002. Previously, he toured with Lucinda Williams as she promoted Car Wheels on a Gravel Road. He also has supported Allison Moorer and Kim Richey.

Vaughan's only solo album (so far) is V, made with members of The Fabulous Superlatives and Marty Stuart himself. The album, released in 2011, is a mix of country, rockabilly, and blues songs written by Vaughan, and includes three instrumental tracks.

In addition to his session work and touring with the Fabulous Superlatives, Vaughan performs as part of his trio whenever he returns to Nashville. The Kenny Vaughan Trio also includes Jeffrey Clemens (G Love and Special Sauce) on drums and Dave Roe (Johnny Cash) on bass.

== Awards ==
In 2002, Vaughan was inducted into the Colorado Country Music Hall of Fame.

In 2006, Vaughan received the Americana Music Association's Instrumentalist of the Year award, and the Lifetime Achievement Award for Instrumentalist.

== Music equipment ==
Vaughan primarily plays chambered-body guitars by Floyd Cassista with Lindy Fralin pickups. His amplifiers have been a Fender Princeton Reverb and a Valco 1x12 combo.

Working with input from Vaughan, Marty Stuart, and Paul Martin, RS Guitarworks produced the Superlative series of guitars and basses.

== Discography ==
=== Solo albums ===
- 2011, ‘’V’’ (Sugar Hill)

=== With Marty Stuart ===
- 2003: Country Music (Columbia)
- 2005: Souls' Chapel (Superlatone)
- 2005: Badlands: Ballads of the Lakota (Superlatone)
- 2006: Live at the Ryman (Superlatone / Universal South)
- 2007: Compadres: An Anthology of Duets (Hip-O)
- 2008: Cool Country Favorites (Superlatone)
- 2010: Ghost Train: The Studio B Sessions (Sugar Hill)
- 2012: Nashville, Volume 1: Tear The Woodpile Down (Sugar Hill)
- 2014: The Gospel Music of Marty Stuart DVD, album (Gaither Music)
- 2014: Saturday Night/Sunday Morning (Superlatone)
- 2017: Way Out West (Superlatone)

=== As primary contributor ===
- 2002: various artists - Dressed in Black: A Tribute to Johnny Cash (Dualtone) - track 15, "Train Of Love"
- 2017: Rob McNurlin - Tent Of The Wicked (Buffalo Skinner) - Guitar and Producer - All Tracks

=== As supporting musician ===
- 1989: Jon Ims - 3 (Rites of Passage) cassette only release
- 1991: Tim O'Brien - Odd Man In (Sugar Hill)
- 1995: Sonny George - Sonny George's Rockin' Country And Western Roundup (Volume One) (Hermitage)
- 1996: Jim Lauderdale - Persimmons ([Upstart)
- 1996: Paul Burch and the WPA Ballclub - Pan-American Flash (Checkered Past)
- 1997: RB Morris - ...Take That Ride... (Oh Boy
- 1998: Lucinda Williams - Live From Austin TX DVD (New West) released in 2005
- 1998: Lucinda Williams - Car Wheels on a Gravel Road (Mercury)
- 1998: RRAF - Calling Dr. Strong (Paladin)
- 2000: Trisha Yearwood - Real Live Woman (MCA Nashville)
- 2000: Steve Almaas - Kingo A Wild One (Parasol Records USA / Lonesome Whippoorwill Sweden)
- 2001: Hal Ketchum - Lucky Man (Curb)
- 2003: John Eddie - Who The Hell Is John Eddie? (Lost Highway / Thrill Show)
- 2004: Gretchen Peters - Halcyon (Curb / Warner Bros.)
- 2004: Mindy Smith - One Moment More (Vanguard)
- 2004: Sugarland - Twice the Speed of Life (Mercury)
- 2005: Bobby Bare - The Moon Was Blue (Dualtone)
- 2005: Jeff Black - Tin Lily (Dualtone)
- 2005: Gary Bennett - Human Condition (Landslide)
- 2005: Tim O'Brien - Cornbread Nation (Sugar Hill)
- 2006: Alan Jackson - Like Red on a Rose (Arista Nashville)
- 2006: John Corbett - John Corbett (Funbone)
- 2007: Porter Wagoner - Wagonmaster (Anti-)
- 2008: Bell & Cooper - Postcards out of the Blue (Dogjaw)
- 2008: Emmylou Harris - All I Intended to Be (Nonesuch)
- 2008: Laurie McClain - Ascend (Kindred Voices)
- 2008: Mando Saenz - Bucket (Thirty Tigers)
- 2008: Matt Nolen - "This One Goes to 11 (self-relessed)
- 2008: Matt Poss - Hinges (Mishawaka)
- 2009: Ted Russell Kamp - Poor Man's Paradise (Dualtone / PoMo)
- 2009: Eric Church - Carolina (Capitol Nashville)
- 2009: Chuck Mead - Journeyman's Wager (Grassy Knoll / Thirty Tigers)
- 2009: Will Hoge - The Wreckage (Rykodisc)
- 2010: Chely Wright - Lifted Off the Ground (Vanguard)
- 2010: Jim Lauderdale - Patchwork River (Thirty Tigers)
- 2010. Mike Farris - The Night the Cumberland Came Alive (eOne)
- 2011: Billy Burnette - Rock N Roll With It (Rock N Roll With It)
- 2011: Bob Wayne - Outlaw Carnie (People Like You)
- 2011: Dave Cox - Shine Your Light (self-released)
- 2011: Renée Wahl - Cumberland Moonshine (RWR)
- 2011: Ted Russell Kamp - Get Back to the Land (Dualtone)
- 2011: Will Hoge - Number Seven (Rykodisc)
- 2011: John Francis O'Mara - The Better Angels (Dualtone)
- 2012: Sarah Gayle Meech - One Good Thing's (self-released)
- 2012: Sandra Boynton - Sandra Boynton's Frog Trouble (Rounder)
- 2012: The Trishas - High, Wide & Handsome (The Trishas Music)
- 2012: Wanda Jackson - Unfinished Business (Sugar Hill)
- 2013: Lorrie Morgan and Pam Tillis - Dos Divas (Red River)
- 2014: Jack Clement - For Once and For All (I.R.S.)
- 2014: Jim Lauderdale - I'm A Song (Sky Crunch)
- 2014: Lana Del Rey - (Ultraviolence (Polydor / Interscope)
- 2014: Laura Cantrell - No Way There from Here (Thrift Shop)
- 2014: Nikki Lane - All Or Nothin' (New West)
- 2014: Ray LaMontagne - Supernova (RCA)
- 2015: The Arcs - Yours, Dreamily, (Nonesuch)
- 2015: Joe Ely - Panhandle Rambler (Rack 'Em)
- 2015: Sam Lewis - Waiting on You (Brash)
- 2016: Liz Longley - Weightless (Sugar Hill)
- 2016: The Pretenders - Alone (BMG)
- 2017: Jim Lauderdale - London Southern (Proper Records)
- 2017: Nikki Lane - Highway Queen (New West)
- 2021: Steve Almaas - Everywhere You've Been (Lonesome Whippoorwill Sweden)
- 2021: Shannon McNally - The Waylon Sessions (Compass Records)
