= Marty Stuart (album) =

Studio album by Marty Stuart
- Released: August 9, 1986
- Genre: Country, Rockabilly
- Length: 32:18
- Language: English
- Label: Columbia
- Producer: Walt Aldridge, Curtis Allen, Mac McAnally

Marty Stuart chronology
Busy Bee Cafe (1982)	Marty Stuart (1986)	Hillbilly Rock (1989)

Professional ratings
Review scores
Source	Rating
Allmusic	link

Marty Stuart is the third studio album by American country music singer Marty Stuart, released in 1986 via Columbia, his only album with that label. He recorded a second album for Columbia titled Let There Be Country, which was not released until 1992.

== Overview ==
The album features 9 songs, four of which were co-written by Stuart. The single "Arlene" made #19 on Hot Country Songs in 1985. "Honky Tonker", "All Because of You", and "Do You Really Want My Lovin'" were also released as singles. "Beyond the Great Divide" is a Karen Brooks cover from her 1985 album, I Will Dance for You.

== Track listing ==
No.	Title	Writer(s)	Length
1.	"Arlene"	Curtis Allen	3:04
2.	"All Because of You"	Steve Forbert	3:13
3.	"The Shape I'm In"	Robbie Robertson	3:03
4.	"Hometown Heroes"	David Mallett	4:15
5.	"Honky Tonker"	Forbert	3:53
6.	"Do You Really Want My Lovin'?"	Marty Stuart, Steve Goodman	3:36
7.	"Maria (Love To See You Again)"	Marty Stuart, Allen	4:07
8.	"Heart of Stone"	Stuart, Allen	3:18
9.	"Beyond The Great Divide"	J.C. Crowley, Jack Wesley Routh	3:49

== Personnel ==
- Marty Stuart - Lead Vocals, Rhythm Guitar
- Curtis Allen, Kathie Baillie, Alan LeBoeuf, Colleen Peterson - Backing & Harmony Vocals
- Jody Maphis - Harmony Vocals, Acoustic Guitar
- Duane Eddy, Vince Gill, Biff Watson, Reggie Young - Lead & Rhythm Guitars
- Mark O'Connor - Fiddle
- Flip Anderson - Piano
- Shane Keister - Synthesizer
- Bobby Whitlock - Organ
- Jim Horn - Saxophone
- Paco Shipp - Harmonica
- T. Michael Coleman, Ralph Ezell - Bass
- W.S. Holland, David Humphreys, Milton Sledge - Drums
- Kenny Malone - Percussion

== Production ==
- Produced By Curtis Allen; co-production on "Honky Tonker" by Walt Aldridge and Mac McAnally
- Recorded & Engineered By Curtis Allen, Jeff Coppage, Ken Criblez, David Ferguson, Mark Hall, Mark Miller, Rocky Schnaars & Al Schulman
- Mixed & Remixed By Curtis Allen & Rocky Schnaars
- Mastered By Hank Williams

== Chart performance ==
Chart (1986)	Peak position
U.S. Billboard Top Country Albums	34
