= Arlene Williams =

American chef and television host

- Born: January 9, 1946; McKeesport, Pennsylvania, U.S.
- Died: September 20, 2017 (aged 71); McKeesport, Pennsylvania, U.S.
- Occupation: Television host
- Spouse: Paul Williams (m. 1974; died 2013)
- Website: athome.ctvn.org

Arlene Williams (January 9, 1946 – September 20, 2017) was the host of Cornerstone Television's show At Home With Arlene Williams. The show was on the air weekly from July 1991 until 2014. It has been in over 100 markets in America, and in Jamaica, Eastern Africa, Australia, and New Zealand. The show gives viewers simple recipes and cooking hints along with Williams preparing the food and giving directions on how to make it. Williams died on September 20, 2017.

A native of the Pittsburgh, Pennsylvania, area, Williams started cooking when she was nine years old. Her father was a pastor. Her mother encouraged her to try recipes that seemed difficult.

== Start in Television ==
Williams got her start in television as a producer for Cornerstone Television. After years behind the camera producing Getting Together, the flagship program, Williams stepped into the creator/producer/host position of a new cooking show, At Home with Arlene Williams, from its debut in July 1991.
