= Arın Soğancıoğlu =

Turkish basketball player (born 1987)

Arın Soğancıoğlu (born May 9, 1987) is a Turkish professional basketball player who played for Beşiktaş, Erdemirspor, and Olin Edirne.
