= Arland (name) =

Arland is both a given name and a surname. Notable people with the name include:

== Given name ==
- Arland Bruce III (born 1977), footballer
- Arland D. Williams Jr. (1935–1982), air crash victim
- Arland F. Christ-Janer (1922–2008), president of Boston University
- Arland Thompson (born 1957), footballer
- Arland Thornton, sociologist
- Arland Ussher (1899–1980), academic
- Burleigh Arland Grimes (1893–1985), baseball player

== Surname ==
- Giacomo Antonio Arland (c. 1668–1743), painter
- Marcel Arland (1899–1986), novelist
