= Harry Stinson (musician) =

American drummer

- Born: Harry Stinson
- Origin: Nashville, Tennessee, U.S.
- Genres: Country; country rock; folk rock
- Occupations: Musician; singer; songwriter; record producer
- Instruments: Drums; vocals; percussion
- Years active: 1970s–present
- Label: Dead Reckoning
- Website: harrystinson.net

Harry Stinson is an American multi-instrumentalist, noted as a session drummer and vocalist in the Nashville music community. He is also a songwriter and producer.

== Biography ==
Stinson grew up in Nashville, where he grew to love country music. He was in a high school band with Morris West, son of country star Dottie West. In 1970, Stinson first worked professionally in Dottie West's band the Heartaches, touring with Red Sovine and Don Gibson, and appearing on the Grand Ole Opry.

In 1974, Stinson substituted for Willie Leacox for the band America's tour.

=== Silver ===
Then Stinson moved to California, where he joined the band Silver with John Batdorf, Tom Leadon, Brent Mydland, and Greg Collier. Silver had one top 20 hit in 1976 with "Wham Bam." Silver recorded one album, but broke up before recording another.

=== Steve Earle and the Dukes ===
In 1985, Stinson moved back to Nashville, and spent two years as a member of Steve Earle's band, the Dukes, along with Bucky Baxter, Richard Bennett, Ken Moore, Emory Gordy, Jr., John Jarvis, Steve Nathan, and Paul Franklin. Stinson toured and also played on Earle's first few albums.

=== Dead Reckoning ===
In the mid-nineties, Stinson founded Dead Reckoning Records with Kieran Kane, Kevin Welch, Tammy Rogers, and Mike Henderson. He also performed live with The Dead Reckoners. Stinson also helped form Kevin Welch's band, the Overtones, with Mike Henderson, Glenn Worf, and Kieran Kane.

=== Marty Stuart and the Fabulous Superlatives ===
In 2002, Marty Stuart formed the Fabulous Superlatives, including Stinson, Kenny Vaughan, and Paul Martin. The band has been an anchor of The Marty Stuart Show on RFD-TV.

=== Session work and touring ===
Stinson has worked with Jimmy Buffett, Jay Ferguson, Al Stewart, Etta James, Peter Frampton, Juice Newton, Elton John, Bob Seger, Leon Russell, Corb Lund, Lyle Lovett, Steve Earle, Bette Midler, Faith Hill, Patty Loveless, George Jones, Nicolette Larson, Neil Diamond, and Earl Scruggs.

=== Television and Cinema ===
Stinson appeared in Bette Midler's film The Rose as part of Monty's Band.

Stinson was a member of TNN’s American Music Shop house band, with Mark O'Connor, Jerry Douglas, Brent Mason, Glenn Worf, John Jarvis, and Matt Rollings.

=== Songwriting ===
Stinson co-wrote "Let It Be You" for Ricky Skaggs, "Wild Angels" for Martina McBride, "You Give Me Love" for Faith Hill, "It’s All Up To You" for Steve Earle and "Where Was I" for Ricky Van Shelton.

== Discography ==
=== Solo albums ===
- 2011: Who is This Man? (self-released)
- 2015: Look Out Heart! (self-released)

=== With Silver ===
- 1976: Silver (Arista)

=== With Steve Earle and the Dukes ===
- 1986: Guitar Town (MCA)
- 1986: Live from Austin TX (New West) released in 2004
- 1987: Exit 0 (MCA)

=== With Kevin Welch and the Overtones ===
- 1990: Kevin Welch (Warner Bros.)
- 1992: Western Beat (Reprise)

=== With the Dead Reckoners ===
- 1997: A Night of Reckoning (Dead Reckoning)

=== With Marty Stuart and His Fabulous Superlatives ===
- 2003: Country Music (Columbia)
- 2005: Souls' Chapel (Superlatone)
- 2005: Badlands: Ballads of the Lakota (Superlatone)
- 2006: Live at the Ryman (Superlatone / Universal South)
- 2007: Compadres: An Anthology of Duets (Hip-O)
- 2008: Cool Country Favorites (Superlatone)
- 2010: Ghost Train: The Studio B Sessions (Sugar Hill)
- 2010: The Marty Stuart Show: The Best Of Season One DVD (Superlatone)
- 2012: Nashville, Volume 1: Tear The Woodpile Down (Sugar Hill)
- 2014: The Gospel Music of Marty Stuart and His Fabulous Superlatives DVD, album (Gaither Music)
- 2014: Saturday Night/Sunday Morning (Superlatone)
- 2017: Way Out West (Superlatone)

=== As composer ===
- 1989: Jann Browne – Tell Me Why (Curb) – track 1, "Tell Me Why" (co-written with Gail Davies)
- 1989: James House – James House (MCA) – track 7, "Lucinda" (co-written with Wendy Waldman and Jim Photoglo)
- 1989: Ricky Skaggs – Kentucky Thunder (Epic) – track 5, "Let It Be You" (co-written with Kevin Welch)
- 1990: Southern Pacific feat. Carlene Carter – County Line (Warner Bros.) – track 4 "Time's Up" (co-written with Kevin Welch and Wendy Waldman)
- 1991: George Fox – Spice of Life (Warner Bros.) – track 7, "Everything About You" (co-written with Kostas)
- 1993: Ricky Van Shelton – A Bridge I Didn't Burn (Columbia) – track 4, "Where Was I" (co-written with Gary Burr)
- 1994: Prescott-Brown – Already Restless (Columbia) – track 10, "The Heart of Love" (co-written with Rick Bowles and Tommy Lee James)
- 1995: Martina McBride – Wild Angels (RCA) – track 1, "Wild Angels" (co-written with Matraca Berg and Gary Harrison); track 9, "You've Been Driving All the Time" (co-written with Pat Bunch)
- 1996: Davis Daniel – I Know a Place (A&M) – track 1, "I Know a Place" (co-written with Tommy Lee James)
- 1998: Faith Hill – Faith (Warner Bros.) – track 2, "You Give Me Love" (co-written with Matraca Berg and Jim Photoglo)

=== Also appears on ===
==== 1979 – 1984 ====
- 1979: Bette Midler – The Rose: The Original Soundtrack Recording (Atlantic)
- 1980: Jay Ferguson – Terms and Conditions (Capitol)
- 1980: Al Stewart and Shot in the Dark – 24 Carrots (Arista)
- 1981: Juice Newton – Juice (Capitol)
- 1981: Al Stewart – Live/Indian Summer (Arista)
- 1982: Peter Frampton – The Art of Control (A&M)
- 1982: Michael Martin Murphey – Michael Martin Murphey (Liberty)
- 1982: Juice Newton – Quiet Lies (Capitol)
- 1982: Wendy Waldman – Which Way to Main Street (Epic)
- 1982: Pia Zadora – Pia (Elektra)
- 1983: Josh Leo – Rockin' on 6th (Warner Bros.)
- 1984: Al Stewart – Russians & Americans (RCA)

==== 1985 – 1989 ====
- 1985: Jimmy Buffett – Last Mango in Paris (MCA)
- 1985: Pointer Sisters – Contact (RCA)
- 1985: Steve Wariner – Life's Highway (MCA)
- 1986: Jimmy Buffett – Floridays (MCA)
- 1986: Sweethearts of the Rodeo – Sweethearts of the Rodeo (CBS)
- 1987: Lyle Lovett – Pontiac (Curb)
- 1987: Ricky Van Shelton – Wild-Eyed Dream (Columbia)
- 1987: Wendy Waldman – Letters Home (Cypress)
- 1988: Patty Loveless – Honky Tonk Angel (MCA)
- 1988: Dana McVicker – Dana McVicker (Capitol)
- 1989: Rodney Crowell – Keys to the Highway (Columbia)
- 1989: Vince Gill – When I Call Your Name (MCA)
- 1989: Emmylou Harris – Bluebird (Reprise)
- 1989: James House – James House (MCA)
- 1989: Lyle Lovett – Lyle Lovett and His Large Band (MCA)
- 1989: Karen Staley – Wildest Dreams (MCA)

==== 1990 – 1994 ====
- 1990: Matraca Berg – Lying to the Moon (RCA)
- 1990: Patty Loveless – On Down the Line (MCA)
- 1990: Reba McEntire – Rumor Has It (MCA)
- 1990: Nitty Gritty Dirt Band – The Rest of the Dream (MCA)
- 1990: Kenny Rogers – Love is Strange (Reprise)
- 1990: Sweethearts of the Rodeo – Buffalo Zone (Columbia)
- 1991: Marty Stuart – Tempted (MCA)
- 1992: Suzy Bogguss – Voices in the Wind (Liberty)
- 1992: Radney Foster – Del Rio, TX 1959 (Arista)
- 1992: Vince Gill – I Still Believe in You (MCA)
- 1992: Flaco Jimenez – Partners (Reprise)
- 1992: The Mavericks – From Hell to Paradise (MCA)
- 1992: Trisha Yearwood – Hearts in Armor (MCA)
- 1993: Matraca Berg – The Speed of Grace (RCA)
- 1993: Suzy Bogguss – Something Up My Sleeve (Liberty)
- 1993: Brooks & Dunn – Hard Workin' Man (Arista)
- 1993: Mark Collie – Mark Collie (MCA)
- 1993: Faith Hill – Take Me as I Am (Warner Bros.)
- 1993: Ricky Van Shelton – A Bridge I Didn't Burn (Columbia)
- 1993: Steve Wariner – Drive (Arista)
- 1994: David Ball – Thinkin' Problem (Warner Bros.)
- 1994: Suzy Bogguss and Chet Atkins – Simpatico (Liberty)
- 1994: George Jones – The Bradley Barn Sessions (MCA)
- 1994: Patty Loveless – When Fallen Angels Fly (Epic)
- 1994: Lyle Lovett – I Love Everybody (Curb / MCA)
- 1994: Tammy Wynette – Without Walls (Epic)

==== 1995 – 1999 ====
- 1995: Confederate Railroad – When and Where (Atlantic)
- 1995: Faith Hill – It Matters to Me (Warner Bros.)
- 1995: Bob Seger and the Silver Bullet Band – It's a Mystery (Capitol)
- 1995: Trisha Yearwood – Thinkin' About You (MCA)
- 1996: Rhett Akins – Somebody New (MCA)
- 1996: Mary Chapin Carpenter – A Place in the World (Columbia)
- 1996: Mike Henderson – Edge of Night (Dead Reckoning)
- 1996: Mike Henderson and the Bluebloods – First Blood (Dead Reckoning)
- 1996: David Lee Murphy – Gettin' Out the Good Stuff (MCA)
- 1997: Matraca Berg – Sunday Morning to Saturday Night (Rising Tide)
- 1998: Ilse DeLange – World of Hurt (Warner Bros.)
- 1999: Suzy Bogguss – Suzy Bogguss (Platinum)
- 1999: Natalie MacMaster – In My Hands (Rounder)

==== 2000–present ====
- 2001: Brooks & Dunn – Steers & Stripes (Arista Nashville)
- 2002: Willie Nelson – The Great Divide (Lost Highway)
- 2003: Gary Allan – See If I Care (MCA)
- 2004: Jimmy Buffett – License to Chill (Mailboat)
- 2005: Jace Everett – Jace Everett (Epic)
- 2007: Brooks & Dunn – Cowboy Town (Arista / Sony)
- 2008: Emmylou Harris – All I Intended to Be (Nonesuch)
- 2009: Gretchen Peters – The Secret of Life (Scarlet Letter)
- 2011: Matraca Berg – The Dreaming Fields (Dualtone)
- 2012: Kenny Vaughan – V (Sugar Hill)
- 2015: Ashley Monroe – The Blade (Warner Music Nashville)
