= Arland =

Arland may refer to:

== People ==
- Arland (name)

== Games ==
- Atelier Rorona: The Alchemist of Arland
- Atelier Totori: Alchemist of Arland 2
- Atelier Meruru: The Alchemist of Arland 3

== Places ==
Norway

- Årland, a village in Austevoll Municipality in Vestland county, Norway
- Årland, Samnanger, a village in Samnanger Municipality in Vestland county, Norway

United States

- Arland, Wisconsin, a town
  - Arland (community), Wisconsin, an unincorporated community

== See also ==
- Aurland Municipality
- Ayreland (disambiguation)
- Harland (disambiguation)
- Hærland
- Waarland
