= Arlene J. Chai =

Filipino-Chinese-Australian author

Arlene J. Chai (born 1955) is a Filipino-Chinese-Australian author.

== Biography ==
Arlene J. Chai was born in 1955 in Manila, Philippines.

She is Filipino by birth, Chinese by ethnicity and migrated to Australia with her parents and sisters in 1982 because of the political upheaval. She became an advertising copywriter at George Patterson's advertising agency in 1972. It is there that she met her mentor Bryce Courtney, who inspired her to improve her work. She graduated with a Bachelor of Arts degree from Maryknoll College. She is infamous for her ability to weave the political struggle of the Philippines so well into her fiction, so much that she is often compared with Isabel Allende, a successful magical realist Chilean novelist.

== Bibliography ==
- The Last Time I Saw Mother (1995)
- Eating Fire and Drinking Water (1996)
- On the Goddess Rock (1998)
- Black Hearts (2000)

== Awards ==
She won the Louis Braille Adult Audio Book of the year for her novel On the Goddess Rock in 1999.
