= Arlen Lancaster =

Arlen L. Lancaster was appointed as the Chief of the United States Department of Agriculture (USDA) Natural Resource Conservation Service by USDA Secretary Mike Johanns on August 23, 2006. Prior to the appointment, he served as USDA Deputy Assistant Secretary for Congressional Relations. Before that, Lancaster worked as a congressional aide for Senators Mike Crapo (R-ID) and Bob Bennett (R-UT) and on the Senate Subcommittee on Forestry, Conservation, and Rural Revitalization. He earned a Bachelor of Science degree from the University of Utah in 1998.
