= Wagonmaster =

Studio album by Porter Wagoner
- Released: June 5, 2007
- Genre: Country
- Label: ANTI-
- Producer: Marty Stuart

Porter Wagoner chronology
The Versatile (2006)	Wagonmaster (2007)	Best of Grand Old Gospel (2008)

Professional ratings
Review scores
Source	Rating
AllMusic	4/5 stars
The Guardian	4/5 stars

Wagonmaster is the fifty-third and final studio album by American country music artist Porter Wagoner, who died on October 28, 2007. It was released on June 5, 2007, via the ANTI- Records label. A music video was made for the album's only single, "Committed to Parkview."

== Track listing ==
All tracks composed by Porter Wagoner; except where indicated

1. "Wagonmaster, Pt. 1" (Marty Stuart) – 0:48
2. "Be a Little Quieter" – 2:25
3. "Who Knows Right from Wrong" (Pearl Butler) – 3:17
4. "Albert Erving" – 4:18
5. "A Place to Hang My Hat" (Shawn Camp, Byron Hill, Brice Long) – 3:24
6. "Eleven Cent Cotton" (Traditional) – 2:39
7. "My Many Hurried Southern Trips" (Dolly Parton, Wagoner) – 3:19
8. "Committed to Parkview" (Johnny Cash) – 3:40
9. "The Agony of Waiting" – 3:36
10. "Buck and the Boys" (Marty Stuart) – 0:52
11. "Fool Like Me" – 2:51
12. "Late Love of Mine" – 3:11
13. "Hotwired" (Shawn Camp, Mark Sanders) – 3:35
14. "Brother Harold Dee" – 4:23
15. "Satan's River" – 3:21
16. "Wagonmaster, Pt. 2" (Marty Stuart) – 1:08
17. Porter & Marty: "Men with Broken Hearts" / "(I Heard That) Lonesome Whistle" (Jimmie Davis / Hank Williams) – 6:04

== Personnel ==
- Jim DeMain – Mastering
- Stuart Duncan – Acoustic Guitar, Fiddle
- Eric Fritsch – Piano, Hammond Organ
- Brian Glenn – Upright Bass
- Carl Jackson – Background Vocals
- Mike Johnson – Pedal Steel
- Gordon Mote – Piano
- Scott Munn – Executive Producer
- Fred Newell – Pedal Steel
- Maria Elena Orbean -Production Coordination
- Adam Smith – Photography
- Harry Stinson – Drums
- Marty Stuart – Acoustic & Electric Guitar, Background Vocals, Poetry, Producer, Photography
- Buck Trent – Banjo, Electric Banjo
- Joey Turner – Engineer, Overdubs, Mixing
- Kenny Vaughan – Acoustic & Electric Guitar, Archguitar
- Porter Wagoner – Author, Vocals
- Stoker White – Assistant

== Chart performance ==
Chart (2007)	Peak position
U.S. Billboard Top Country Albums	63
