= Aryn Michelle =

American singer (born 1983)

- Also known as: Aryn Michelle
- Born: Aryn Michelle Campbell; September 9, 1983 (age 42); Fort Worth, Texas
- Genres: Worship, contemporary Christian music, Christian alternative rock
- Occupations: Singer, songwriter
- Instrument: Vocals
- Years active: 2006–present
- Website: arynmichelle.com

Aryn Michelle Calhoun (née Campbell; born September 9, 1983), known professionally as Aryn Michelle, is an American Christian musician and songwriter. She has released four studio albums; Lockless Heart in 2009, Last One Standing in 2011, Depth in 2015, and The Realest Thing in 2017.

== Early life and education ==
Aryn Michelle Calhoun (née Campbell), was born on September 9, 1983, in Fort Worth, Texas, the daughter of a pastor, Gerald Wayne Campbell, and Aundrea Belle Campbell (née, Mull). Her songwriting career began at 15 years old. She graduated from Southwestern University in 2006, and from Berklee College of Music in 2009, where she was awarded the Scott Benson Award, given to honor songwriting.

== Career ==
She started her music career in 2006, while her first studio album, Lockless Heart, was released on May 12, 2009, from True Renaissance Music. Her subsequent studio album, Last One Standing, was released on October 4, 2011, with True Renaissance Music. During this time she was also recognized for her songwriting by being named TexasCSA’s 2010 Songwriter of the Year, winning KLTY’s 2010 Chick-fil-A Celebrate Freedom Jingle Competition and being a national top ten finalist in the 2011 Foldgers’ Jingle Writing Contest. Aryn began recording distinctly faith-based music in 2014 because she finally felt confirmed in her calling to write insightful, challenging, and thoughtful songs for the people of the church. In 2014 she was named Female Artist and Writer of the Year at Gospel Music Association’s Immerse Competition. She released, Depth, with True Renaissance Music, on August 14, 2015. Her song, "Do the Same", was profiled in a "Behind the Song" feature at New Release Today, with Kevin Davis. In 2017 she released a concept album on Christian apologetics that was inspired by the book, Reasonable Faith, by Dr. William Lane Craig. She released Nothing Can Take Me Away in 2019, an EP of prayer and praise songs. She released Pariah Pt. 1, a concept album inspired by the lives of biblical outcasts on September 3, 2021.

== Personal life ==
She is married to Clinton Calhoun.

== Discography ==
=== Studio albums ===
- Lockless Heart (2009)
- Last One Standing (2011)
- Depth (2015)
- The Realest Thing (2017)
- Nothing Can Take Me Away (2019)
- PARIAH (2022)
- Pilot Light(2023)
- Wild Beautiful Dangerous(2024)
