= Aryn Baker =

American journalist

- Education: Sarah Lawrence College; University of California, Berkeley
- Occupation: Journalist
- Spouse: Tamim Samee

Aryn Baker is an American journalist who is Time magazine's Africa correspondent. She was previously based in Beirut, Lebanon, for Time as the Middle East bureau chief, and has been a correspondent in Pakistan and Afghanistan.

== Early life ==
Baker attended Sarah Lawrence College from 1991 to 1995 and received her Bachelor of Arts in anthropology and literature. She then received her master's degree in journalism at the University of California, Berkeley, in 2001. While at UC Berkeley, Baker explored radio journalism, foreign reporting and longform writing.

== Career ==
Baker worked as a freelance journalist in print and radio while earning her master's at UC Berkeley. She wrote articles for the San Jose Mercury News, the Los Angeles Times, the East Bay Express, the Asia Wall Street Journal and the Village Voice. She produced a weekly radio show for KALX at Berkeley and interned at KQED in San Francisco.

In 2001, Baker started working with Time's international edition based in Hong Kong.

Starting her international reporting career, she traveled from Hong Kong to India, Pakistan, Afghanistan, Iran, Syria, Saudi Arabia, Yemen, Egypt, Libya and many other countries across Africa.

She was named the Middle East bureau chief for Time in September 2010, and produced breaking news, features, analyses and investigative stories throughout the region. Specifically, she wrote about the Arab Spring, the war on terror and the Ebola crisis in West Africa. Baker stayed in the Middle East for four years and maintained contacts with diplomats, politicians, activists and others in order to provide her with the best in-depth on-the-ground reporting. She also worked intensely with photojournalists to help give life to her stories.

Baker became the Africa bureau chief for Time magazine in September 2014, and is now in this position, living in Cape Town, South Africa. She covers politics, art, technology, society, health and other social conflicts in Sub-Saharan Africa. Baker's most recent stories from earlier this year have been covering Zika, Boko Haram, corruption in military defense spending, and women facing rape in war-ridden Uganda and Congo.

== Notable work ==
Baker wrote a story about Bibi Aisha in 2010. The story was about an Afghan woman whose nose had been cut off by Taliban, and the gripping details caused an uproar in national and international women's rights debates, the Taliban and U.S. troops.

She also wrote a collection of stories on the Ebola virus in 2014.

Baker also wrote a piece on the Zika virus in early 2016, where she explored the origins of the virus and where it's headed around the world.

Baker did a series of stories on the "secret war crime" in Africa, which generally is the epidemic of wartime rape that has been plaguing African countries for many years.

== Volunteer experiences ==
Baker became a member of the International Reporting Project at the Johns Hopkins School of Advanced International Studies in 2005.

She is an active board member of the Center for Civilians in Conflict (CIVIC), which is headquartered in Washington, D.C. but has centers located in Syria, Somalia and Afghanistan. CIVIC is a disaster and humanitarian relief effort agency, and focuses on helping civilians caught in armed conflict.

== Awards ==
Baker was the All Media winner for the Daniel Pearl Award in 2012 for outstanding reporting about South Asia. This award was through the South Asian Journalism Association (SAJA).

== Personal life ==
Baker is married to Tamim Samee, an Afghan-American IT entrepreneur. She currently lives in Cape Town, South Africa.

She is fluent in French and English.
