= Satisfied Mind (Porter Wagoner album) =

Studio album by Porter Wagoner
- Released: February 4, 1957
- Recorded: February 14, 1953–June 26, 1956
- Studios: Thomas Productions (Nashville, Tennessee); KWTO Radio Station Studio (Springfield, Missouri); RCA Victor Studio (Nashville, Tennessee)
- Genre: Country
- Length: 30:51
- Label: RCA Victor

Porter Wagoner chronology
Satisfied Mind (1957)	A Slice of Life: Happy 'n' Sad (1962)

Singles from Satisfied Mind
- 1. "Company's Comin'" Released: September 1954; 2. "A Satisfied Mind" Released: May 1955

Satisfied Mind is the debut studio album by American country music singer Porter Wagoner. It was released by RCA Victor on February 4, 1957.

== Critical reception ==
In the issue dated February 16, 1957, Billboard published a review of the album, which read, "Altho Porter Wagoner has not come thru with any smash singles lately, he is certainly one of the steadiest standard artists in the C&W field and dealers should find this package a profitable item. Wagoner's TV show will help move this also. The recordings are excellent. They are in the traditional style, are very tastefully arranged, and include songs with which Wagoner has scored, such as "Company's Comin'", "Tricks of the Trade", and "A Satisfied Mind"."

== Commercial performance ==
The album did not appear on any major charts.

The album's first single, "Company's Comin'", was released in September 1954 and peaked at No. 7 on the US Billboard Country Singles chart. The second single, "A Satisfied Mind" was released in May 1955 and peaked at No. 1.

== Track listing ==
Side one
No.	Title	Writer(s)	Recording date	Length
1.	"A Satisfied Mind"	Hayes, Rhoads	September 11, 1954	2:46
2.	"My Bonfire"	Whatley, Segal	December 30, 1953	2:49
3.	"I Like Girls"	Coben	January 9, 1956	1:59
4.	"Ivory Tower"	Fulton, Steele	June 26, 1956	2:34
5.	"Company's Comin'"	Mullins	ca. July 1954	2:45
6.	"Born to Lose"	Brown	June 26, 1956	2:47

Side two
No.	Title	Writer(s)	Recording date	Length
1.	"Midnight"	Bryant, Atkins	June 26, 1956	2:50
2.	"That's It"	Walker, Wagoner	February 14, 1953	2:15
3.	"I Guess I'm Crazy (For Loving You)"	Fairburn	June 26, 1956	2:44
4.	"I'm Stepping Out Tonight"	Mooney	August 7, 1955	2:23
5.	"Living in the Past"	C. Ferguson, S. Ferguson	August 7, 1955	2:33
6.	"Tricks of the Trade"	Wilson	ca. July 1954	2:32
