= Arline Burks Gant =

American actor, director and costume designer

Arline Burks Gant is a director, actress and costume designer. She wrote, produced and directed the international children's video, Manners, and the documentary series The Legends.

== Career ==
In 1995, Arline Burks Gant started Dakota P. Productions to develop films and television programming in High Definition. Arline has written, produced and directed children's videos for international distribution. She also wrote, produced and directed a dramatic short film, "Couture in the Extreme." Arline directed a 15-minute comedic sitcom, "25 Lighthouse, for cable programming. In 2012 she directed and produced for stage "Introducing Sepia Girl," and "The Story of Minnie the Moocher." She is currently in production with "The Upbeat Show" and "Upbeat Kidz Rock" a variety television show across the Midwest Fall 2016.

Gant's professional experiences ~ in front and behind the camera ~ began in her pre-teens as the cover girl for Magnificent Hair Products. During her teen years, she continued runway and print modeling. She also was a principal dancer for "The Upbeat Show," a nationally syndicated rock and roll music variety television program, before heading to Europe to work as a runway model for several couture houses.

In time, Gant was featured in several films. The Cleveland native started designing her own clothing line, and then opened a factory in Senegal, West Africa. She gradually shifted into costume design by creating fashion concepts for new recording groups under contract at Motown Records. Her credits include such as "Deep Cover" starring Laurence Fishburne and Jeff Goldblum, and "Daughters of the Dust" directed by Julie Dash, as well as the sitcom, "Martin" for Universal Studios.

=== Directing and writing ===
Burks Gant's work also includes:

- Get Real (directed)
- Beat the Clock (wrote)
- We Rock (wrote)
- Race to the White House (wrote)
- Jeni (wrote)
- 89th Street Corridor (wrote)
- Secret Sec (wrote)
- Scream in the Breeze (wrote)

=== Costume design ===
Burks Gant has designed costumes for a number of productions including:

- Martin Lawrence Show
- Daughters of the Dust
- Deep Cover
- Talented Tenth
- Lovable Blond Seeking
- Gloria and Pat
- Baldwin Hills Boys
- Harmony
- AC Black

== Achievements ==
- 1992 Costume Designer of the Year / 1993 Theatre Awards- Joan and the Zulus
