= You Can't Stop Love (Marty Stuart song) =

Single by Marty Stuart

from the album Honky Tonkin's What I Do Best
- B-side: "The Mississippi Mudcat and Sister Sheryl Crow"
- Released: October 26, 1996
- Genre: Country
- Length: 4:01
- Label: MCA
- Songwriter(s): Marty Stuart, Kostas
- Producer(s): Tony Brown, Justin Niebank

Marty Stuart singles chronology
| "Thanks to You" (1996) | "You Can't Stop Love" (1996) | "Sweet Love" (1997) |

"You Can't Stop Love" is a song co-written and recorded by American country music artist Marty Stuart. It was released in October 1996 as the third single from the album Honky Tonkin's What I Do Best. The song reached #26 on the Billboard Hot Country Singles & Tracks chart. The song was written by Stuart and Kostas.

== Chart performance ==
| Chart (1996–1997) | Peak position |
|---|---|
| US Hot Country Songs (Billboard) | 26 |
| Canadian RPM Country Tracks | 38 |
