= Cheap Love =

Song by Del Shannon

"Cheap Love" is a song written and recorded by American musician Del Shannon for his eleventh studio album Drop Down and Get Me (1981). The song became a top ten country hit for Juice Newton in 1986.

== Juice Newton version ==
"Cheap Love"

Single by Juice Newton

from the album Old Flame
- B-side: "Old Flame"
- Released: August 23, 1986
- Genre: Country rock
- Length: 3:32
- Label: RCA
- Songwriter(s): Del Shannon
- Producer(s): Richard Landis

Juice Newton singles chronology
"Both to Each Other (Friends and Lovers)" (1986)	"Cheap Love" (1986)	"What Can I Do with My Heart" (1987)

Official audio
- "Cheap Love" on YouTube

American country rock singer Juice Newton released her rendition of "Cheap Love" on her seventh studio album Old Flame. By 1985, Newton's stardom as a country pop singer had waned and Old Flame, took her in an emphatically country music direction with great success as its first two singles, "You Make Me Want to Make You Mine" and "Hurt", both reached of which topped the Billboard Hot Country Singles chart. After a third single release, "Old Flame", reached number five on the same chart, RCA Records elected to release "Cheap Love" as a fourth single from the album in August 1986. The single peaked at number nine on the Billboard Hot Country Singles chart.

"Cheap Love" was later covered by Marty Stuart, under the name "Sweet Love", for his ninth studio album Honky Tonkin's What I Do Best (1996). Stuart's version was released as the final single from the album in August 1997.

== Chart performance ==
Chart (1986)	Peak position
U.S. Billboard Hot Country Singles	9
Canadian RPM Country Tracks	5
