= Arlene Anderson Skutch =

American singer, actress, and artist (b. 1924, d. 2012)

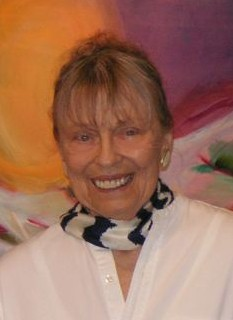
- Born: 4 April 1924; Fostoria, Ohio
- Died: 2012
- Known for: Her 725 performances in Finian's Rainbow

Arlene Anderson Skutch (1924–2012) was a singer, actress and award-winning fine artist, painter and art teacher for the Pink House Painters Collective in Westport, Connecticut from 1970 to 2012.

== Early life ==
Arlene Anderson Skutch was born April 4, 1924, and lived in Fostoria, Ohio, with her mother Ruth, father Lorenz, and sister Betty.

== Career ==
Prior to her career as a visual artist, Skutch had a successful career as a singer in several Broadway musicals, most notably for 725 performances in Finian's Rainbow from 1947 to 1948 as well as 657 performances of Bloomer Girl 1944–1946 and a short run of the revival of George and Ira Gershwin's Of Thee I Sing.

Her father, Lorenz Anderson, was an accomplished concert violinist and toured much of the mid-west at beginning of the 20th century with his classical trio. Lorenz fostered the love and study of music in his two daughters and urged them to pursue professional acting and singing in New York City in 1945. Skutch moved there with her sister Betty and auditioned as a duet. They were exceptional singers and were constantly employed in the casts of major theatrical productions.

Skutch worked with many luminaries of musical theater including Ira Gershwin, Harold Arlen, Burton Lane, Yip Harburg, Michael Kidd, Agnes de Mille, John Raitt, Celeste Holm, Ella Logan, and David Wayne.

Skutch eventually left the theater and married screenwriter, advertising executive, and publisher of A Course in Miracles, Robert Skutch. The couple moved to Westport, Connecticut, in 1952 and bought an 1876 saltbox colonial house they restored and painted pink after honeymooning in Cuba where they admired the brightly painted houses on the island. At that time, Skutch also had a brief stint on CBS radio's FBI in Peace and War and television with John Raitt on The Buick Circus Hour. Skutch had two children, Laura and Andrew but was divorced from Robert in 1965 and remained in the Pink House in Westport. The house had a studio on the property that was designed by the famous postmodern architect Eliot Noyes which she eventually began to use as her art studio. She began to study with local painting instructors Ann Chernow, Gusti Wyman, Charles Reid, and Constance Kiermaier at Silvermine School of Art in New Canaan, CT when her children started school.

== Notable achievements ==
Skutch's most notable achievement aside from producing a vast body of work is mentoring dozens of students over a 42-year teaching career. Her "Pink House Painters" collective was a tightly knit group of local painters who gathered weekly for instruction in Skutch's studio. The artists of the Pink House Painters exhibited regularly and earned regional recognition and awards.

Skutch received a certificate in 1994 as an art teacher who had a "most significant influence on the development of a young artist" in the 1993–1994 National Foundation for Advancement in the Arts Talent Search. Skutch was a featured artists in "Years in the Making" a documentary highlighting the careers of many notable Westport Connecticut artists over the age of 70. (Westport is a hub for the fine arts with many well known accomplished actors, musicians and visual artists making their home in Westport, Connecticut.)

In 2012, Skutch was also added, posthumously, to the Westport Arts Awards "Heritage Honor Roll" which "honors local artists who have passed away ... [as] significant members of Westport's artistic heritage." Writer J. D. Salinger was also inducted with eight others alongside Skutch.

Her teaching style was notable for her ability to inspire beginners to paint with their own "vision" and to allow that to emerge naturally.

"You have to trust your instincts, and follow your own inner direction in pursuit of personal ideas about what you want to paint. You can't ignore technical skills, but they have to grow along the lines of your vision."
