= The Pilgrim (Marty Stuart album) =

Studio album by Marty Stuart
- Released: June 15, 1999
- Genre: Country
- Length: 48:57
- Language: English
- Label: MCA Nashville
- Producer: Marty Stuart

Marty Stuart chronology
Honky Tonkin's What I Do Best (1996)	The Pilgrim (1999)	Country Music (2003)

The Pilgrim is the 10th studio album of country music artist Marty Stuart, released in 1999. It is a concept album, telling the story of a man (The Pilgrim) from Stuart's hometown of Philadelphia, Mississippi. Stuart plays the role of the Pilgrim, as well as other roles. It was a significant move in Stuart's career, as before The Pilgrim, he had been focusing more on trying to score a hit song instead of making the music that really mattered to him. With this album, he demonstrates his songwriting skills (every track is either written or co-written by Stuart) and his diverse instrumental skills. The album features many country/bluegrass legends as guest stars, including Emmylou Harris, Pam Tillis, George Jones, Ralph Stanley, Earl Scruggs and Johnny Cash.

== Plot ==
The Pilgrim is based on a true story of a man from Stuart's hometown, named Norman. Everyone was surprised when Norman (described as "cross-eyed Norman" in the album's liner notes) married Rita, the town's beauty queen. As time went by, Norman grew more and more possessive and jealous. Rita took comfort in the charms of a man she worked with at the hospital. That man was The Pilgrim, who came from a town 40 miles away, and did not know that Rita was married. She never responded to his affections, despite the fact that he begged her to marry him. She never told him she was married. Norman began to feel the distance between him and Rita at home, and knew she was on the verge of leaving him. One evening, Norman came home, and Rita wasn't there. He wrote her a letter, put it in his coat pocket, got his gun and went in search of his wife. He found her at the hospital - holding hands with The Pilgrim. He began making threats, and The Pilgrim, not knowing who Norman was, jumped up to defend Rita. She had to finally admit that she was married. Norman then regained control, and shook The Pilgrim's hand, saying "I just wanted to meet the man that tore up my home and let him see what it's done". The Pilgrim tried reasoning with Norman, claiming that he did not know Rita was married, but his words fell on deaf ears. Norman kissed Rita, told her that he loved her more than life, handed her the letter, and shot himself in the head. After Norman's funeral, Rita left town to escape the scandal, and The Pilgrim was in despair. He truly loved Rita. The only thing he was guilty of was falling in love with a woman that he didn't know was married. He left town, and began hitchhiking and hoboing all across America. He developed a drinking problem, and rode the rails until he reached the Pacific. It was at the Pacific where he decided that the love he had known had to be put back together. He tracked Rita down, and today the couple are happily married and raising a family.

== Reception ==
The album fared poorly in the charts, but was popular amongst critics and Stuart's fans, receiving almost entirely positive reviews.

== Track listing ==
No.	Title	Writer(s)	Length
1.	"Intro"	Marty Stuart	0:26
2.	"Sometimes The Pleasure's Worth the Pain"	Marty Stuart, Gary Nicholson	3:10
3.	"The Pilgrim (Act I)"	Marty Stuart	0:54
4.	"Harlan County"	Marty Stuart	1:32
5.	"Reasons"	Marty Stuart	3:31
6.	"Love Can Go To..."	Marty Stuart	0:31
7.	"Red, Red Wine and Cheatin' Songs"	Marty Stuart	3:12
8.	"Truckstop"	Marty Stuart	1:27
9.	"Hobo's Prayer"	Marty Stuart	3:37
10.	"Goin' Nowhere Fast"	Marty Stuart	3:11
11.	"The Observations of a Crow"	Marty Stuart	5:27
12.	"Intermission"	Marty Stuart	0:31
13.	"The Greatest Love of All Time"	Marty Stuart	3:29
14.	"The Greatest Love of All Time (Reprise)"	Marty Stuart	1:54
15.	"Draggin' Around These Chains of Love"	Marty Stuart, Mike Campbell	3:13
16.	"The Pilgrim (Act II)"	Marty Stuart	0:37
17.	"Redemption"	Marty Stuart	1:49
18.	"The Pilgrim (Act III)"	Marty Stuart	6:04
19.	"Outro"	Words: Excerpt from "Sir Galahad" by Alfred, Lord Tennyson, Music by Marty Stuart	2:33
20.	"Mr. John Henry, Steel Driving Man"	Marty Stuart, Earl Scruggs	2:01

Deluxe Edition Bonus Tracks
No.	Title	Length
21.	"The Pilgrim (Act IV)" (unreleased alternate take)	1:21
22.	"That'll Be All Right With Me"	2:55
23.	"Been Lonely Too Long" (Demo)	3:03
24.	"I Think We're In Texas"	0:21
25.	"Shout Little Lulie"	2:03
26.	"Call And Response"	0:40
27.	"Evelina"	1:25
28.	"Tennessee Wagoner"	1:58
29.	"Even Trains Have To Cry" (Demo)	3:36
30.	"The Vanishing" (Demo)	1:31

== Deluxe Edition ==
In honor of the album's 20th anniversary in 2019, The Pilgrim was reissued in several forms, including digital and vinyl deluxe editions featuring 10 previously unreleased bonus tracks. In addition, a coffee table book was released under the title of The Pilgrim: A Wall-To-Wall Odyssey. The package includes a CD of the original album and the deluxe edition tracks and the text itself tells the story of the album's history and production, as well as its ultimate release and reappraisal.

== The Marty Stuart Show ==
Marty Stuart (alongside his Fabulous Superlatives) often performs tracks from this album on The Marty Stuart Show on RFD-TV. They have performed tracks such as 'Reasons', 'Red, Red Wine, And Cheatin' Songs', 'Hobo's Prayer', 'The Greatest Love Of All Time', 'The Pilgrim (Act III)' and with special guest Earl Scruggs, 'Mr John Henry, Steel Driving Man'.

== Personnel ==
As listed in liner notes

- Marty Stuart - lead vocals, acoustic guitar, electric guitar, mandolin

=== The Rock & Roll Cowboys ===
- Steve Arnold - bass
- Gary Hogue - Steel guitar
- Brad Davis - Vocals, electric guitar, acoustic guitar
- Gregg Stocki - drums, timpani, percussion

=== Personnel ===
- Jamie Tate - Recording and Mix Engineer
- Mike Campbell - 12-string guitar, electric guitar
- Tony Brown - Piano
- Barry Beckett - Hammond B-3 organ
- Stuart Duncan - Fiddle
- Larry Marrs - Background vocals
- Johnny Counterfeit - voices
- Earl Scruggs - acoustic guitar, banjo
- "Uncle" Josh Graves - dobro
- Carl Marsh - sound fx, calliope, organ
- Rusty Golden - piano
- Mike Bub - upright bass
- Jim Brown - B3 organ, piano
- Johnny Cash - vocals on 'Outro'
- George Jones - vocals on 'Truckstop'
- Emmylou Harris - vocals on 'The Pilgrim (Act I)' and 'Truckstop'
- Pam Tillis - vocals on 'Reasons'
- Ralph Stanley & The Clinch Mountain Boys - vocals, banjo, acoustic bass, acoustic guitar and fiddle on 'Harlan County' and 'The Pilgrim (Act II)
- Matt Spicher - 2nd Recording Engineer
- Hank Williams - Mastering

== Chart performance ==
Chart (1999)	Peak position
U.S. Billboard Top Country Albums	63
Canadian RPM Country Albums	21
