= Ariño =

Ariño, Spain
- Location within Spain
- Coordinates: 41°02′N 0°36′W
- Country: Spain
- Autonomous community: Aragon
- Province: Teruel
- Municipality: Ariño

Area
  - Total: 81.93 km^{2} (31.63 sq mi)
- Elevation: 536 m (1,759 ft)

Population (2025-01-01)
  - Total: 605
  - Density: 7.38/km^{2} (19.1/sq mi)
- Time zone: UTC+1 (CET)
  - Summer (DST): UTC+2 (CEST)

Ariño (Spanish pronunciation: [aˈɾiɲo]) is a municipality located in the province of Teruel, Aragon, Spain. According to the 2004 census (INE), the municipality has a population of 898 inhabitants. A former leader of the ELN- José Antonio Jiménez Comín was born in this municipality and died in 1970 in Colombia.

== See also ==
- List of municipalities in Teruel
