= Arlene (song) =

Single by Marty Stuart

from the album Marty Stuart
- B-side: "Midnight Moonlight"
- Released: December 28, 1985
- Genre: Country
- Length: 3:04
- Label: Columbia
- Songwriter(s): Curtis Allen
- Producer(s): Curtis Allen

Marty Stuart singles chronology
"Arlene" (1985)	"Honky Tonker" (1986)

"Arlene" is a debut song recorded by American country music artist Marty Stuart. It was released in December 1985 as the first single from the album Marty Stuart. The song reached #19 on the Billboard Hot Country Singles & Tracks chart. The song was written by Curtis Allen.

== Chart performance ==
Chart (1985–1986)	Peak position
US Hot Country Songs (Billboard)	19
Canadian RPM Country Tracks	53
