= The Marty Party Hit Pack =

Compilation album by Marty Stuart
- Released: 1995
- Genre: Country
- Length: 37:35
- Label: MCA Nashville
- Producer: Don Cook; Gregg Brown; Richard Bennett; Tony Brown; Don Was

Marty Stuart chronology
Love and Luck (1994)	The Marty Party Hit Pack (1995)	Honky Tonkin's What I Do Best (1996)

The Marty Party Hit Pack is a compilation album by American country music singer Marty Stuart. It was released in 1995 via MCA Nashville.

== Content ==
The album includes several cuts from Stuart's 1991 album Tempted and 1992 album This One's Gonna Hurt You, plus his 1991 duet with Travis Tritt, "The Whiskey Ain't Workin'", previously on Tritt's 1991 album It's All About to Change. Two tracks on the album previously appeared on multi-artist tribute albums: the rendition of The Band's "The Weight" previously appeared on the 1994 album Rhythm, Country and Blues and the rendition of "Don't Be Cruel" previously appeared on the 1994 album It's Now or Never: The Tribute to Elvis. "The Likes of Me" and "If I Ain't Got You" are new to the compilation. Both were released as singles, but failed to make Top 40 on the Hot Country Songs chart. The latter was originally recorded by Conway Twitty on his 1993 album Final Touches, which, like Stuart's version, was produced by Don Cook.

== Reception ==
Professional ratings
Review scores
Source	Rating
AllMusic	4.5/5 stars
New Country	3/5 stars
Robert Christgau	(neither)

Jana Pendragon of Allmusic rated the album 4.5 out of 5 stars, saying that "This is a hits package that shows off Marty Stuart's hard-earned success with tongue firmly planted in cheek." Jay Orr of New Country rated the compilation 3 out of 5 stars. His review criticized the album as "more like a marketing concept than a career move" due to only six of the songs coming from Stuart's own albums. He praised "If I Ain't Got You" as "a twangy rock 'n' roller" but criticized "The Likes of Me" as "generic radio fodder". Orr also criticized Stuart's vocal performance on the covers of "The Weight" and "Don't Be Cruel", but overall cited the album as a "neat summation of Stuart's work".

The album was certified gold by the Recording Industry Association of America (RIAA) on August 10, 1998, for U.S. shipments of 500,000 copies.

== Track listing ==
No.	Title	Writer(s)	Producer(s)	Length
1.	"If I Ain't Got You"	Craig Wiseman, Trey Bruce	Don Cook	2:56
2.	"The Whiskey Ain't Workin'" (with Travis Tritt)	Marty Stuart, Ronny Scaife	Gregg Brown	2:40
3.	"Hillbilly Rock"	Paul Kennerley	Richard Bennett, Tony Brown	2:37
4.	"Now That's Country"	Stuart	Bennett, T. Brown	3:22
5.	"Burn Me Down"	Eddie Miller, Don Sessions	Bennett, T. Brown	2:56
6.	"The Likes of Me"	Larry Boone, Rick Bowles	Cook	3:47
7.	"Tempted"	Kennerley, Stuart	Bennett, T. Brown	3:12
8.	"This One's Gonna Hurt You (For a Long, Long Time)" (with Travis Tritt)	Stuart	Bennett, T. Brown	3:28
9.	"Little Things"	Kennerley, Stuart	Bennett, T. Brown	3:10
10.	"The Weight" (with The Staple Singers)	Robbie Robertson	T. Brown, Don Was	3:37
11.	"Western Girls"	Kennerley	Bennett, T. Brown	3:36
12.	"Don't Be Cruel" (with The Jordanaires)	Otis Blackwell, Elvis Presley	Was	2:07
Total length:				37:35

== Personnel on new tracks ==
Compiled from the liner notes.

- Marty Stuart – lead vocals, electric guitar, acoustic guitar
- Larry Marrs – background vocals
- John Wesley Ryles – background vocals
- Mark Casstevens – acoustic guitar
- Dennis Burnside – Hammond organ
- Brent Mason – electric guitar
- Michael Rhodes – bass guitar
- John Barlow Jarvis – piano
- Lonnie Wilson – drums, percussion
- Paul Franklin – pedal steel guitar
- Rob Hajacos – fiddle
