= Tempted =

Tempted may refer to:

== Books ==
- Tempted (von Ziegesar novel), a 2008 novel in The It Girl series
- Tempted (Cast novel), a 2009 novel by P. C. Cast

== Music ==
- Tempted (Marty Stuart album), 1991
  - "Tempted" (Marty Stuart song), its title track
- Tempted (Waterlillies album), 1994
- "Tempted" (Squeeze song), 1981
- "Tempted" (Jazz Cartier song), 2017
- "Tempted", a 2015 song by Dave Gahan and Soulsavers from Angels & Ghosts
- "Tempted", a 1964 song by Jess Conrad
- "Tempted", a 1987 song by John Verity
- "Tempted", a 1968 song by Johnny Williams
- "Tempted", a 1982 song by Jon English from Some People

== Film and television ==
- Tempted (film), a 2001 American film
- Tempted (TV series), a 2018 South Korean TV series

== Horse racing ==
- Tempted (horse) (born 1955), American racehorse
- Tempted Stakes, annual horse race at Aqueduct Race Track in Queens, New York
