= Great Video Hits of The Judds =

Video by The Judds
- Released: April 18, 1990
- Genre: Country
- Length: 16:30
- Label: RCA Records
- Producer: Brent Maher; Mark Pleasant

The Judds chronology
Collector's Series (1990)	Great Video Hits of The Judds (1990)	Love Can Build a Bridge (1990)

Great Video Hits of The Judds is a video album by American country music duo The Judds, released in 1990 by RCA Records. It was the duo's second video album released in their career and their second to sell over 500,000 copies in the United States. The album contained the duo's music videos released by the RCA Records label.

== Background, content and release ==
By 1990, The Judds were among country music's most popular duo's. Prior to this, the pair had several number one hits, five successful studio albums and several concert tours. Up to this point, the duo had released four music videos as well, which were seen on Country Music Television and MTV. Great Video Hits of the Judds contained all four of these music videos in chronological order: "Mama He's Crazy," "Love Is Alive," "Grandpa (Tell Me 'Bout the Good Ol' Days)" and "Give a Little Love." All of these singles had been number one hits on the Billboard country singles chart. The music itself for all four videos was originally produced by Brent Maher. The video collection itself was directed by Mark Pleasant.

Great Video Hits of The Judds was released in 1990 via Curb and RCA Records. It was issued as a VHS and was their first video collection for the label. In June 1990, the video release sold over 500,000 copies, helping it to certify gold from the Recording Industry Association of America. It was The Judds' second video album to achieve a gold certification from the RIAA.

== Track listing ==
Great Video Hits of The Judds (1990)
No.	Title	Writer(s)	Length
1.	"Mama He's Crazy"	Kenny O'Dell	3:08
2.	"Love Is Alive"	Kent Robbins	3:51
3.	"Grandpa (Tell Me 'Bout the Good Old Days)"	Jamie O'Hara	4:05
4.	"Give a Little Love"	Paul Kennerley	3:51
Total length:			16:30

== Personnel ==
All credits are adapted from the liner notes of Great Video Hits of The Judds.

- Stephen Buck – producer
- Camille Engel – design
- Martin Fischer – producer
- Robert K. Glassenberg – senior producer
- Mary Hamilton – art direction
- David Hogan – director
- Brent Maher – music producer
- David Naylor – producer
- Ellen Parker – design
- Mark Pleasant – video compilation director
- Bud Schaetzle – director
- Small Wonder Studio – production

== Certifications ==
Region	Certification	Certified units/sales
United States (RIAA)	Gold	50,000^{^}
^{^} Shipments figures based on certification alone.

== Release history ==
Region	Date	Format	Label	Ref.
United States	1990	VHS	Curb Records; RCA Records	
