= Hillbilly Rock =

Studio album by Marty Stuart
- Released: October 17, 1989
- Studio: Sound Stage Studios, Nashville, TN
- Genre: Neotraditional country; honky-tonk
- Length: 32:42
- Label: MCA Nashville
- Producer: Richard Bennett; Tony Brown

Marty Stuart chronology
Marty Stuart (1986)	Hillbilly Rock (1989)	Tempted (1991)

Singles from Hillbilly Rock
- 1. "Cry! Cry! Cry!" Released: August 1989; 2. "Don't Leave Her Lonely Too Long" Released: November 1989; 3. "Hillbilly Rock" Released: March 1990; 4. "Western Girls" Released: September 1, 1990

Professional ratings
Review scores
Source	Rating
Allmusic	link

Hillbilly Rock is the fourth studio album by American country music artist Marty Stuart. It was released in October 1989 by MCA Nashville. It peaked at #19 on the Top Country Albums chart but failed to chart on the Canadian charts. It was certified Gold in both countries. The songs "Cry! Cry! Cry!", "Don't Leave Her Lonely Too Long", "Hillbilly Rock", and "Western Girls" were released as singles.

== Musical style and composition ==
Hillbilly Rock has been described as a neotraditional country, honky-tonk, and country rock album, with elements of rockabilly, bluegrass, and Western music.

== Critical reception ==
Peter Saros of Country Universe praised the album in a retrospective review, referring to it as "an essential album from the early '90s country canon that bristles with 'gutsy, imaginative, guitar-gramed [sic] arrangements, and stormy sensuality' even as it is too often overshadowed by the bigger commercial successes of its era."

== Content ==
Several songs on this album are covers or would later be covered by other artists. Johnny Cash's "Cry! Cry! Cry!" first appeared on his 1957 album With His Hot and Blue Guitar. "Me and Billy the Kid" was written and recorded by Joe Ely for his album Lord of the Highway and would later be covered by Pat Green and Kevin Welch and the Overtones. "Don't Leave Her Lonely Too Long" was covered by Gary Allan on his 1998 album It Would Be You.

== Track listing ==
No.	Title	Writer(s)	Length
1.	"Hillbilly Rock"	Paul Kennerley	2:38
2.	"Western Girls"	Kennerley, Marty Stuart	3:38
3.	"Don't Leave Her Lonely Too Long"	Stuart, Kostas	3:22
4.	"The Coal Mine Blues"	Stuart	3:05
5.	"The Wild One"	Tillman Franks, Merle Kilgore	3:12
6.	"Me and Billy the Kid"	Joe Ely	3:56
7.	"Cry! Cry! Cry!"	Johnny Cash	2:20
8.	"When the Sun Goes Down"	Stuart, Mark Collie	2:42
9.	"Easy to Love (Hard to Hold)"	Stuart, Kennerley	2:53
10.	"Since I Don't Have You"	Stuart, Collie	5:33

== Personnel ==
- Richard Bennett - electric guitar, acoustic guitar, 6 string bass
- Paul Franklin - steel guitar
- Glen Hardin - piano
- Paul Kennerley - background vocals
- Kostas - background vocals
- Joey Miskulin - concertina
- Ralph Mooney - steel guitar
- Leland Sklar - bass guitar
- Harry Stinson - background vocals
- WS "Fluke" Holland - drums
- Marty Stuart - lead vocals, electric guitar, mandolin, acoustic guitar
- Billy Thomas - drums, background vocals
- Alan Messer- photographer

== Production ==
- Produced By Tony Brown & Richard Bennet
- Engineers, Assistant Engineers: Dave Boyer, Mark J. Coddington, Marty Williams
- Mixing: Chuck Ainlay
- Overdub Engineers: Chuck Ainlay, Mark J. Coddington
- Digital Editing: Milan Bogdan
- Mastering, Master Tape Preparation: Glenn Meadows

== Chart performance ==
=== Weekly charts ===
Chart (1989–1990)	Peak position
US Top Country Albums (Billboard)	19

=== Year-end charts ===
Chart (1990)	Position
US Top Country Albums (Billboard)	36

=== Singles ===
Year	Single	Peak positions	
Year	Single	US Country	CAN Country
1989	"Cry! Cry! Cry!"	32	59
1990	"Don't Leave Her Lonely Too Long"	42	25
1990	"Hillbilly Rock"	8	6
1990	"Western Girls"	20	16

== Certifications ==
Region	Certification	Certified units/sales
Canada (Music Canada)	Gold	50,000^{^}
United States (RIAA)	Gold	500,000^{^}
^{^} Shipments figures based on certification alone.
