= Bluebird (Emmylou Harris album) =

Studio album by Emmylou Harris
- Released: January 10, 1989
- Recorded: Nashville, 1988
- Genre: Country
- Length: 39:12
- Label: Warner Bros. Nashville
- Producers: Richard Bennett, Emmylou Harris

Emmylou Harris chronology
Angel Band (1987)	Bluebird (1989)	Duets (1990)

Singles from Bluebird
- 1. "Heartbreak Hill" Released: December 17, 1988; 2. "Heaven Only Knows" Released: April 1989

Bluebird is the fifteenth studio album by American country artist Emmylou Harris, released on January 10, 1989, by Warner Records. Featuring mostly interpretations of work by artists such as the McGarrigle Sisters, Tom Rush, and Rodney Crowell, it included her most recent top-ten country-charting single, "Heartbreak Hill". The album enjoyed renewed interest in 2004 when "Heaven Only Knows" was used in the first episode of the fifth season of The Sopranos.

Professional ratings
Review scores
Source	Rating
AllMusic	3/5 stars
Chicago Tribune	3/4 stars
Los Angeles Times	3.5/4 stars

Bonnie Raitt provided guest vocals on the track "Icy Blue Heart". Billboard said in their review of the album that, "Like most of Emmylou Harris' albums, Bluebird is an expertly performed album, featuring some truly startling and affecting tour de forces" (sic).

== Track listing ==
No.	Title	Writer(s)	Length
1.	"Heaven Only Knows"	Paul Kennerley	3:36
2.	"You've Been on My Mind"	Rodney Crowell	2:54
3.	"Icy Blue Heart" (background vocals by Bonnie Raitt)	John Hiatt	4:08
4.	"Love Is"	Kate McGarrigle, Anna McGarrigle, Jane McGarrigle	3:53
5.	"No Regrets"	Tom Rush	5:38
6.	"Lonely Street"	Carl Belew, W.S. Stevenson, Kenny Sowder	3:14
7.	"Heartbreak Hill"	Emmylou Harris, Kennerley	3:12
8.	"I Still Miss Someone"	Johnny Cash, Roy Cash, Jr.	2:51
9.	"A River for Him"	Harris	5:02
10.	"If You Were a Bluebird"	Butch Hancock	4:44

== Personnel ==
Musicians

- Emmylou Harris - acoustic guitar, guitar, percussion, vocals
- Richard Bennett - acoustic guitar, bass, guitar, mandolin, percussion, electric guitar, 12-string guitar, producer
- Ashley Cleveland - background vocals
- Donivan Cowart - background vocals
- Glen Duncan - mandolin
- Steve Fishell - acoustic guitar, dobro, pedal steel, electric bass, electric guitar
- Emory Gordy, Jr. - conductor, string arrangements
- Glen Hardin - synthesizer, piano
- Mike Henderson - slide guitar
- Kieran Kane - mandolin
- Mary Ann Kennedy - background vocals
- Paul Kennerley - acoustic guitar
- Kenny Malone - percussion
- Carl Marsh - synthesizer, Hammond organ
- Anna McGarrigle - background vocals
- Kate McGarrigle - accordion, background vocals
- Mark O'Connor - mandolin
- Dave Pomeroy - electric bass, acoustic bass, bass violin
- Bonnie Raitt - background vocals, slide guitar
- Pamela Rose - background vocals
- Harry Stinson - background vocals
- Marty Stuart - mandolin
- Barry Tashian - acoustic guitar, background vocals
- Billy Thomas - percussion, drums, vocals

Others

- Emmylou Harris - producer
- Richard Bennett - producer
- Donivan Cowart - engineer
- Paul Dieter - mixing assistant
- Caroline Greyshock - photography
- Janet Levinson - art direction, design
- George Massenburg - mixing
- Glenn Meadows - mastering
- Eric Paul - assistant engineer
- Sharon Rice - mixing assistant
- Mark Richardson - engineer

== Charts ==
=== Weekly charts ===
Chart (1989)	Peak position
Canadian Country Albums (RPM)	19
US Top Country Albums (Billboard)	15

=== Year-end charts ===
Chart (1989)	Position
US Top Country Albums (Billboard)	49

== Release history ==
Release history and formats for Bluebird
Region	Date	Format	Label	Ref.
North America	January 10, 1989	LP; CD; cassette	Warner Bros. Records	
