= Heartbreak Hill (song) =

Single by Emmylou Harris

from the album Bluebird
- B-side: "Icy Blue Heart"
- Released: December 17, 1988
- Genre: Country
- Length: 3:09
- Label: Reprise
- Songwriters: Emmylou Harris, Paul Kennerley
- Producers: Richard Bennett, Emmylou Harris

Emmylou Harris singles chronology
"Back in Baby's Arms" (1988)	"Heartbreak Hill" (1988)	"Heaven Only Knows" (1989)

"Heartbreak Hill" is a song co-written and recorded by American country music artist Emmylou Harris. It was released in December 1988 as the first single from the album Bluebird. The song reached number 8 on the Billboard Hot Country Singles & Tracks chart. The song was written by Harris and Paul Kennerley.

== Chart performance ==
Chart (1988–1989)	Peak position
US Hot Country Songs (Billboard)	8

=== Year-end charts ===
Chart (1989)	Position
Canada Country Tracks (RPM)	54
