= Now That's Country =

Single by Marty Stuart

from the album This One's Gonna Hurt You
- B-side: "Me & Hank & Jumpin' Jack Flash"
- Released: September 12, 1992
- Genre: Country rock, blues rock, rock and roll
- Length: 3:22
- Label: MCA
- Songwriter: Marty Stuart
- Producer: Richard Bennett

Marty Stuart singles chronology
"This One's Gonna Hurt You (For a Long, Long Time)" (1992)	"Now That's Country" (1992)	"High on a Mountain Top" (1993)

"Now That's Country" is a song written and recorded by American country music artist Marty Stuart. It was released in September 1992 as the second single from the album This One's Gonna Hurt You. The song reached #18 on the Billboard Hot Country Singles & Tracks chart.

== Chart performance ==
Chart (1992)	Peak position
Canada Country Singles (RPM)	16
US Hot Country Songs (Billboard)	18
