= Love Can Build a Bridge (album) =

Studio album by the Judds
- Released: September 11, 1990
- Recorded: c. April 1990
- Studios: Creative Workshop (Nashville, Tennessee); Sunset Sound (Hollywood, California)
- Genre: Country
- Length: 38:48
- Label: RCA
- Producer: Brent Maher

The Judds chronology
Great Video Hits of the Judds (1990)	Love Can Build a Bridge (1990)	Love Can Build a Bridge (1990)

Singles from Love Can Build a Bridge
- 1. "Born to Be Blue" Released: August 6, 1990; 2. "Love Can Build a Bridge" Released: December 3, 1990; 3. "One Hundred and Two" Released: April 8, 1991

Love Can Build a Bridge is the sixth and final studio album by American country music duo the Judds, released by RCA Records in September 1990. It features the singles "Born to Be Blue", the title track, and "One Hundred and Two". The title track has later been covered by several other artists.

== Critical reception ==
Professional ratings
Review scores
Source	Rating
AllMusic	4/5 stars

Billboard published a mixed review of the album in the September 22, 1990, issue. The review praised the Judds "striking vocal harmonies," but criticized the album as not "memorable." The review said the album lacks a "clarifying observation," a "soul-revealing story," or a "final-word phrase," leaving the listener wishing for "more substance."

== Track listing ==
No.	Title	Writer(s)	Length
1.	"Born to Be Blue"	Brent Maher, Mike Reid, Mack David	4:50
2.	"Calling in the Wind"	Maher, Don Schlitz, Craig Bickhardt	3:56
3.	"In My Dreams"	Austin Cunningham	3:37
4.	"Rompin' Stompin' Bad News Blues"	Naomi Judd, Schlitz	4:15
5.	"Love Can Build a Bridge"	N. Judd, Paul Overstreet, John Barlow Jarvis	5:23
6.	"This Country's Rockin'"	N. Judd, Keith Sykes, Robert White Johnson	3:00
7.	"One Hundred and Two"	Wynonna Judd, Don Potter, Paul Kennerley	3:56
8.	"John Deere Tractor"	L. John Hammond	3:29
9.	"Talk About Love"	Jack Sundrud, Carl Struck	3:16
10.	"Are the Roses Not Blooming?"	Thom Schuyler	3:10
Total length:			38:48

== Personnel ==
The Judds

- Naomi Judd – vocals
- Wynonna Judd – vocals

Additional musicians

- Eddie Bayers – drums
- Craig Bickhardt – acoustic guitar
- Mark Casstevens – acoustic guitar
- Christ Church Choir – choir
- Paul Franklin – acoustic slide guitar, steel guitar
- Sonny Garrish – dobro, steel guitar
- John Barlow Jarvis – piano
- Farrell Morris – percussion
- Bobby Ogdin – organ, piano
- Don Potter – acoustic guitar, electric guitar
- Bonnie Raitt – electric slide guitar
- Mark Tanner – cello
- Jack Williams – bass guitar

== Charts ==
Chart performance for Love Can Build a Bridge
Chart (1990)	Peak position
US Billboard 200	62
US Top Country Albums (Billboard)	5
