= Till I Found You =

Single by Marty Stuart

from the album Tempted
- B-side: "Half a Heart"
- Released: April 1991
- Genre: Country
- Length: 2:24
- Label: MCA
- Songwriters: Hank DeVito; Paul Kennerley
- Producers: Richard Bennett; Tony Brown

Marty Stuart singles chronology
"Little Things" (1991)	"Till I Found You" (1991)	"Tempted" (1991)

"Till I Found You" is a song written by Hank DeVito and Paul Kennerley, and recorded by American country music artist Marty Stuart. It was released in April 1991 as the second single from his album Tempted. The song reached number 12 on the Billboard Hot Country Singles & Tracks chart in July 1991.

== Chart performance ==
Chart (1991)	Peak position
Canada Country Singles (RPM)	11
US Hot Country Songs (Billboard)	12
