= Heaven Only Knows (song) =

Single by Emmylou Harris

from the album Bluebird
- B-side: "A River for Him"
- Released: April 1989
- Genre: Country
- Length: 3:43
- Label: Reprise
- Songwriter: Paul Kennerley
- Producers: Richard Bennett, Emmylou Harris

Emmylou Harris singles chronology
"Heartbreak Hill" (1989)	"Heaven Only Knows" (1989)	"I Still Miss Someone" (1989)

"Heaven Only Knows" is a song written by Paul Kennerley, and recorded by American country music singer Emmylou Harris. It was released in April 1989 as the second single from the album Bluebird. The song reached Number 16 on the Billboard Hot Country Singles & Tracks chart.

== Chart performance ==
Chart (1989)	Peak position
Canada Country Singles (RPM)	16
US Hot Country Songs (Billboard)	16

== In popular culture ==
- The song is repeatedly featured in S5E1 of The Sopranos, "Two Tonys"
