= Kiss Me, I'm Gone =

Single by Marty Stuart

from the album Love and Luck
- B-side: "Marty Stuart Visits the Moon"
- Released: January 22, 1994
- Genre: Country
- Length: 3:02
- Label: MCA
- Songwriter(s): Marty Stuart, Bob DiPiero
- Producer(s): Tony Brown, Marty Stuart

Marty Stuart singles chronology
"Hey Baby" (1993)	"Kiss Me, I'm Gone" (1994)	"Love and Luck" (1994)

"Kiss Me, I'm Gone" is a song co-written and recorded by American country music artist Marty Stuart. It was released in January 1994 as the first single from the album Love and Luck. The song reached #26 on the Billboard Hot Country Singles & Tracks chart. The song was written by Stuart and Bob DiPiero.

== Chart performance ==
Chart (1994)	Peak position
US Hot Country Songs (Billboard)	26
Canadian RPM Country Tracks	23
