= Final Touches =

Studio album by Conway Twitty
- Released: August 31, 1993
- Recorded: March 1992−May 1993
- Studio: Sound Shop (Nashville, Tennessee)
- Genre: Country
- Length: 34:20
- Label: MCA
- Producer: Don Cook

Conway Twitty chronology
| Even Now (1991) | Final Touches (1993) | Conway Twitty Sings Songs of Love (1995) |

Final Touches is a full-length album by country music singer Conway Twitty, released in 1993, the year of his death. Allmusic's Dan Cooper called it "a less fitting swan song for Twitty than his duet on “Rainy Night in Georgia” with Sam Moore on the Rhythm, Country and Blues album." The album was Twitty's 58th and final solo album, and 67th overall (counting albums released with Loretta Lynn).

"The Likes of Me" was later recorded by Marty Stuart on his 1995 album The Marty Party Hit Pack.

Professional ratings
Review scores
| Source | Rating |
|---|---|
| Allmusic | link |

== Track listing ==
1. "Two Timin' Two Stepper" (Bobby Byrd, Kostas) - 3:28
2. "I Hurt for You" (Deborah Allen, Rafe Van Hoy) - 3:53
3. "Don't It Make You Lonely" (Jackson Leap) - 3:14
4. "I'm the Only Thing (I'll Hold Against You)" (Joe Diffie, Kim Williams, Lonnie Wilson) - 4:01
5. "I Don't Love You" (Liz Hengber, Tommy Lee James) - 3:15
6. "The Likes of Me" (Larry Boone, Rick Bowles) - 3:27
7. "An Old Memory Like Me" (Don Cook, John Barlow Jarvis) - 3:46
8. "Final Touches" (Gordon Bradberry, Tony Colton) - 2:45
9. "You Are to Me" (Billy Livsey, Don Schlitz) - 3:22
10. "You Ought to Try It Sometime" (Troy Seals, Eddie Setser, Billy Spencer) - 2:59

== Production ==
- Produced by Don Cook
- Associate producers: Conway Twitty, Dee Henry
- Mike Bradley: engineer, mixing
- Mark Capps: assistant engineer, mixing assistant
- Mastering: Hank Williams (engineer)

== Personnel ==
- Conway Twitty – lead vocals
- Lonnie Wilson – drums, percussion
- Glenn Worf – bass guitar
- Bruce Bouton – steel guitar, slide guitar
- Mark Casstevens – acoustic guitar
- Brent Mason – electric guitar
- Dennis Burnside – keyboards, piano, Hammond organ
- Rob Hajacos – fiddle
- Dennis Wilson – background vocals
- Curtis Young – background vocals

== Chart performance ==
| Chart (1993) | Peak position |
|---|---|
| U.S. Billboard Top Country Albums | 29 |
| U.S. Billboard 200 | 135 |
