= This One's Gonna Hurt You =

Studio album by Marty Stuart
- Released: July 7, 1992
- Recorded: 1991–1992
- Studio: Javelina Recording Studios, Masterfonics, Recording Arts, Sound Stage Studios, and Woodland Sound Studios Nashville, TN
- Genre: Country
- Length: 33:40
- Label: MCA Nashville
- Producer: Richard Bennett, Tony Brown

Marty Stuart chronology
Tempted (1991)	This One's Gonna Hurt You (1992)	Let There Be Country (1992)

Professional ratings
Review scores
Source	Rating
Allmusic	4/5 stars

This One's Gonna Hurt You is the sixth studio album by American country music artist Marty Stuart, released on July 7, 1992, by MCA Nashville. It peaked at #12 on the Top Country Albums chart, and #6 on the Canadian albums chart. Four singles were released from it, "This One's Gonna Hurt You (For a Long, Long Time)", "Now That's Country", "High on a Mountain Top" and "Hey Baby". The album was certified Gold by the RIAA in the United States, and was certified Platinum in Canada. "Honky Tonk Crowd" was later released as a single by Rick Trevino from his self-titled album.

== Track listing ==
No.	Title	Writer(s)	Length
1.	"Me, Hank & Jumpin' Jack Flash"	Marty Stuart	4:00
2.	"High on a Mountain Top"	Alex Campbell, Ola Belle Reed	4:03
3.	"This One's Gonna Hurt You (For a Long, Long Time)" (duet with Travis Tritt)	Stuart	3:28
4.	"Down Home"	Stuart, Paul Kennerley	2:40
5.	"Just Between You and Me"	Cowboy Jack Clement	2:16
6.	"Hey Baby"	Stuart, Kennerley	3:04
7.	"Doin' My Time" (duet with Johnny Cash)	Jimmie Skinner	3:24
8.	"Now That's Country"	Stuart	3:22
9.	"The King of Dixie"	Stuart, Allen Shamblin	4:02
10.	"Honky Tonk Crowd"	Stuart	3:15

== Personnel ==
- Flip Anderson - Hammond B-3 organ
- Sam Bacco - chimes, percussion, timpani, vibraphone
- Richard Bennett - 12-string electric guitar, 12-string acoustic guitar, acoustic guitar, electric guitar, mandolin, percussion, slide guitar
- Joan Besen - piano
- Johnny Cash - duet vocals on "Doin' My Time"
- Ashley Cleveland - background vocals
- Brad Davis - acoustic guitar
- Stuart Duncan - fiddle
- Paul Franklin - steel guitar, slide guitar
- Josh Graves - Dobro
- Vicki Hampton - background vocals
- John Hughey - steel guitar, slide guitar
- John Barlow Jarvis - organ, piano
- Paul Kennerley - acoustic guitar, background vocals
- Jana King - background vocals
- Larry Marrs - bass guitar, background vocals
- Carl Marsh - Fairlight, organ
- Donna McElroy - background vocals
- Lisa Silver - background vocals
- Harry Stinson - drums, background vocals
- Marty Stuart - acoustic guitar, electric guitar, mandolin, lead vocals
- John Sturdivant Jr. - drums
- Pam Tillis - background vocals
- Travis Tritt - duet vocals on "This One's Gonna Hurt You (For A Long, Long Time)"
- Dennis Wilson - background vocals

== Chart performance ==
=== Album ===
Chart (1992)	Peak position
U.S. Billboard Top Country Albums	12
U.S. Billboard 200	77
Canadian RPM Country Albums	6

=== Singles ===
Year	Single	Peak positions	
Year	Single	US Country	CAN Country
1992	"This One's Gonna Hurt You (For a Long, Long Time)" (with Travis Tritt)	7	6
1992	"Now That's Country"	18	16
1993	"High on a Mountain Top"	24	29
1993	"Hey Baby"	38	31
