= Tempted (Marty Stuart album) =

Studio album by Marty Stuart
- Released: January 22, 1991
- Recorded: 1990
- Studio: Sound Stage Studios, Nashville, TN
- Genre: Honky-tonk; country rock
- Length: 30:01
- Label: MCA Nashville
- Producer: Richard Bennett; Tony Brown

Marty Stuart chronology
Hillbilly Rock (1989)	Tempted (1991)	This One's Gonna Hurt You (1992)

Singles from Tempted
- 1. "Little Things" Released: January 7, 1991; 2. "Till I Found You" Released: April 1991; 3. "Tempted" Released: August 12, 1991; 4. "Burn Me Down" Released: January 1992

Professional ratings
Review scores
Source	Rating
AllMusic	4.5/5 stars

Tempted is the fifth studio album by American country music artist, Marty Stuart. It was released in January 1991 by MCA Nashville. It peaked at #20 on the Top Country Albums chart. It was certified Gold in the United States and Canada. The songs, "Little Things", "'Til I Found You", "Tempted" and "Burn Me Down" were released as singles and all of them reached the top 20 on the Billboard Hot Country Songs charts. "Tempted" at #5 is the highest charting solo single of his career in the United States, although he would reach #2 in 1992 as a duet partner on Travis Tritt's "The Whiskey Ain't Workin'."

== Musical style and composition ==
Tempted has been described as a honky-tonk and country rock album.

== Content ==
Several songs on this album are covers. "I'm Blue, I'm Lonesome" was co-written by Bill Monroe and Hank Williams and was featured on Monroe's 1966 album, High Lonesome Sound of Bill Monroe. In addition, "Get Back to the Country" was released as a single in 1985 by Neil Young from his album Old Ways.

== Critical reception ==
Jana Pendragon of Allmusic gave the album four-and-a-half stars out of five, comparing it to Dwight Yoakam's Hillbilly Deluxe in style and saying, "Stuart kicks country-pop in its well-defined hindquarters[…]But Stuart is just as deadly when he slows things down and does a ballad."

== Track listing ==
No.	Title	Writer(s)	Length
1.	"I'm Blue, I'm Lonesome"	Bill Monroe, Hank Williams	3:21
2.	"Paint the Town Tonight"	Marty Stuart	2:01
3.	"Till I Found You"	Hank DeVito, Paul Kennerley	2:24
4.	"Tempted"	Stuart, Kennerley	3:16
5.	"Blue Train"	Johnny Cash, Billy Smith	3:08
6.	"Little Things"	Stuart, Kennerley	3:10
7.	"Half a Heart"	Stuart, Kostas	2:34
8.	"I Want a Woman"	Stuart, Kostas	4:16
9.	"Burn Me Down"	Eddie Miller, Don Sessions	2:56
10.	"Get Back to the Country"	Neil Young	2:55
Total length:			30:01

== Personnel ==
As listed in liner notes.

- Sam Bacco - percussion, timpani
- Amanda Bennett - tambourine, hand claps
- Richard Bennett - acoustic guitar, electric guitar, mandolin, 6 string bass, mandolin-guitarophone
- Bill Cuomo - Hammond organ
- Stuart Duncan - fiddle
- Dave Durocher - drums on tracks 2, 5, 7
- Ray Flacke - electric guitar on tracks 2, 5, 7
- Paul Franklin - steel guitar
- Ray Herndon - background vocals
- John Barlow Jarvis - keyboards
- Paul Kennerley - background vocals
- Kostas - background vocals
- Larry Marrs - bass guitar on tracks 2, 5, 7, background vocals
- Alan O'Bryant - background vocals
- Mark O'Connor - fiddle
- Les & Janice Reynolds – hand claps
- Harry Stinson - drums
- Marty Stuart - lead vocals, acoustic guitar, electric guitar, mandolin
- Billy Thomas - background vocals
- Glenn Worf - bass guitar

== Charts ==
=== Weekly charts ===
Chart (1991)	Peak position
US Billboard 200	193
US Top Country Albums (Billboard)	20

=== Year-end charts ===
Chart (1991)	Position
US Top Country Albums (Billboard)	49

=== Singles ===
Year	Single	Peak positions	
Year	Single	US Country	CAN Country
1991	"Little Things"	8	3
1991	"'Til I Found You"	12	11
1991	"Tempted"	5	4
1992	"Burn Me Down"	7	12
