= Waterlillies (duo) =

- Origin: New York City, U.S.
- Genres: Dance; electronica; experimental; trip hop
- Years active: 1988–1996
- Labels: Sire; Reprise; Warner
- Past members: Ray Carroll; Sandra Jill Alikas-St. Thomas

Waterlillies was a male-female electronica–pop–trip hop duo that released a pair of albums on Sire/Reprise/Warner Bros. Records in the 1990s. Group members are instrumentalist and producer Ray Carroll, with vocalist Jill Alikas-St. Thomas. Its first album was Envoluptuousity (1992). The group's biggest success came in 1994 when the title track of its second album, Tempted, hit number four on the Hot Dance Music/Club Play chart.

Propelled by a remix by Junior Vasquez, the song "Never Get Enough" went to number one on the US dance chart in 1995.

== Discography ==
=== Albums ===
- Envoluptuousity (1992)
- Tempted (1994)

=== Singles ===
- "Tired of You" (1992)
- "Sunshine Like You" (1992)
- "Tempted" (1994)
- "Never Get Enough" (1994)

== See also ==
- List of number-one dance hits (United States)
- List of artists who reached number one on the US Dance chart
- Waterlilies - Lie With You
