= Hillbilly Rock (song) =

Single by Marty Stuart

from the album Hillbilly Rock
- B-side: "Western Girls"
- Released: March 1990
- Genre: Country rock, rockabilly
- Length: 2:38
- Label: MCA
- Songwriter: Paul Kennerley
- Producers: Richard Bennett, Tony Brown

Marty Stuart singles chronology
"Don't Leave Her Lonely Too Long" (1990)	"Hillbilly Rock" (1990)	"Western Girls" (1990)

"Hillbilly Rock" is a song written by Paul Kennerley, and recorded by American country music artist Marty Stuart. It was released in March 1990 as the third single and title track from the album Hillbilly Rock. The song reached No. 8 on the Billboard Hot Country Singles & Tracks chart.

== Background ==
According to an interview with Marty Stuart, songwriter Paul Kennerley initially composed "Hillbilly Rock" for the Judds to potentially record. Conversely, Stuart had signed a new deal with MCA Records in the late 1980s following his brief tenure at Columbia Records. Music executive Tony Brown, who had signed Stuart to MCA, subsequently paired him with Kennerley to write songs together, during which Kennerley presented "Hillbilly Rock" to Stuart and persuaded him to record the song himself.

== Music video ==
The music video was directed by Joanne Gardner and premiered in early 1990.

== Chart performance ==
Chart (1990)	Peak position
Canada Country Singles (RPM)	6
US Hot Country Songs (Billboard)	8

=== Year-end charts ===
Chart (1990)	Position
Canada Country Tracks (RPM)	78
