= Little Things (Marty Stuart song) =

Single by Marty Stuart

from the album Tempted
- B-side: "Paint the Town"
- Released: January 7, 1991
- Recorded: October 1990
- Genre: Country
- Length: 3:10
- Label: MCA
- Songwriters: Marty Stuart, Paul Kennerley
- Producers: Richard Bennett, Tony Brown

Marty Stuart singles chronology
"Western Girls" (1990)	"Little Things" (1991)	"Till I Found You" (1991)

"Little Things" is a song co-written and recorded by American country music artist Marty Stuart. It was released in January 1991 as the first single from the album Tempted. The song reached #8 on the Billboard Hot Country Singles & Tracks chart. It was written by Stuart and Paul Kennerley.

== Chart performance ==
Chart (1991)	Peak position
Canada Country Singles (RPM)	3
US Hot Country Songs (Billboard)	8

=== Year-end charts ===
Chart (1991)	Position
Canada Country Tracks (RPM)	66
