= One Hundred and Two =

Single by The Judds

from the album Love Can Build a Bridge
- B-side: "Are the Roses Not Blooming"
- Released: April 8, 1991
- Genre: Country
- Length: 3:55
- Label: RCA/Curb
- Songwriters: Wynonna Judd, Paul Kennerley, Don Potter
- Producer: Brent Maher

The Judds singles chronology
"Love Can Build a Bridge" (1991)	"One Hundred and Two" (1991)	"John Deere Tractor" (1991)

"One Hundred and Two" is a song written by Wynonna Judd, Paul Kennerley and Don Potter, and recorded by American country music duo The Judds. It was released in April 1991 as was the third single from the album Love Can Build a Bridge. The song reached number 6 on the Billboard Hot Country Singles & Tracks chart.

== Chart performance ==
"One Hundred and Two" debuted on the U.S. Billboard Hot Country Singles & Tracks for the week of April 13, 1991.

Chart (1991)	Peak position
Canada Country Singles (RPM)	5
US Hot Country Songs (Billboard)	6

=== Year-end charts ===
Chart (1991)	Position
Canada Country Tracks (RPM)	68
US Country Songs (Billboard)	54
