= Western Girls (Marty Stuart song) =

Single by Marty Stuart

from the album Hillbilly Rock
- B-side: "Me and Billy the Kid"
- Released: September 1, 1990
- Genre: Country
- Length: 3:37
- Label: MCA
- Songwriters: Marty Stuart, Paul Kennerley
- Producers: Richard Bennett, Tony Brown

Marty Stuart singles chronology
"Hillbilly Rock" (1990)	"Western Girls" (1990)	"Little Things" (1991)

"Western Girls" is a song co-written and recorded by American country music artist Marty Stuart. It was released in September 1990 as the fourth single from the album Hillbilly Rock. The song reached #20 on the Billboard Hot Country Singles & Tracks chart. It was written by Stuart and Paul Kennerley.

== Critical reception ==
A review from the Gavin Report was positive, stating that "follows the same rockin' formula" as his previous single "and should further endear him to listeners."

== Charts ==
Chart (1990)	Peak position
Canada Country Singles (RPM)	16
US Hot Country Songs (Billboard)	20
