= Burn Me Down (song) =

Single by Marty Stuart

from the album Tempted
- B-side: "Blue Train"
- Released: January 1992
- Genre: Country
- Length: 2:56
- Label: MCA
- Songwriters: Eddie Miller, Don Sessions
- Producers: Richard Bennett, Tony Brown

Marty Stuart singles chronology
"Tempted" (1991)	"Burn Me Down" (1992)	"This One's Gonna Hurt You (For a Long, Long Time)" (1992)

"Burn Me Down" is a song written by Eddie Miller and Don Sessions, and recorded by American country music artist Marty Stuart. The song was released in January 1992 as the fourth single from the album Tempted. The song reached #7 on the Billboard Hot Country Singles & Tracks chart.

== Critical reception ==
Lisa Smith and Cyndi Hoelzle of Gavin Report described the song positively, stating that "Marty lets the message smolder while the song blazes outta control."

== Chart performance ==
Chart (1992)	Peak position
Canada Country Singles (RPM)	12
US Hot Country Songs (Billboard)	7

=== Year-end charts ===
Chart (1992)	Position
US Country Songs (Billboard)	62
