= The Legend of Jesse James =

1980 concept album written by Paul Kennerley

Studio album by Paul Kennerley
- Released: 1980
- Recorded: 1979
- Genre: Country
- Label: A&M
- Producer: Glyn Johns

Paul Kennerley chronology
White Mansions (1978)	The Legend of Jesse James (1980)
- The original CD cover.

Professional ratings
Review scores
Source	Rating
AllMusic	4/5 stars

The Legend of Jesse James is a 1980 country music concept album written by English songwriter Paul Kennerley, based on the story of American Old West outlaw Jesse James.

The album features Levon Helm singing the role of Jesse James, Johnny Cash as Frank James, Charlie Daniels as Cole Younger and Emmylou Harris as Jesse James' wife, Zerelda James. Other singers featured included Rosanne Cash, Rodney Crowell and Albert Lee.

The album was re-released in 1999 in a two-for-one package with Kennerley's 1978 concept album, White Mansions, about the Confederate States of America.

The album art was painted by noted comic book artist Howard Chaykin.

== Track listing ==
All tracks are written by Paul Kennerley.

No.	Title	Artist(s)	Length
1.	"Ride of the Redlegs"	Rodney Crowell, Jody Payne, Levon Helm and Rosanne Cash	3:30
2.	"Quantrill's Guerillas"	Levon Helm	0:56
3.	"Six Gun Shooting"	Johnny Cash	3:46
4.	"Have You Heard the News?"	Albert Lee	1:42
5.	"Heaven Ain't Ready for You Yet"	Emmylou Harris	3:58
6.	"Help Him, Jesus"	Johnny Cash	3:39
7.	"The Old Clay County"	Charlie Daniels and Levon Helm	3:35
8.	"Riding with Jesse James"	Charlie Daniels	3:02
9.	"Hunt Them Down"	Albert Lee	3:33
10.	"Wish We Were back in Missouri"	Emmylou Harris	4:06
11.	"Northfield: The Plan"	Levon Helm	4:04
12.	"Northfield: The Disaster"	Charlie Daniels	3:04
13.	"High Walls"	Levon Helm	3:16
14.	"The Death of Me"	Johnny Cash and Levon Helm	3:07
15.	"The Plot"	Paul Kennerley	0:53
16.	"One More Shot"	Levon Helm and Emmylou Harris	5:11
17.	"A Train Robbery" (extra track in 1999 CD re-issue)	Paul Kennerley	4:10

== Personnel ==
=== Cast ===
- Johnny Cash as Frank James (vocals)
- Rosanne Cash as Ma Samuel (vocals)
- Donivan Cowart as Robert Ford (vocals)
- Martin Cowart as Charley Ford (vocals)
- Rodney Crowell as The Officer (vocals)
- Charlie Daniels as Cole Younger (vocals, fiddle, slide guitar)
- Emmylou Harris as Zerelda Mimms James (vocals, acoustic guitar)
- Levon Helm as Jesse James (vocals, drums, harmonica)
- Paul Kennerley as James Timberlake (vocals, guitars)
- Albert Lee as Jim Younger (vocals, guitars, mandolin)
- Jody Payne as Doc Samuel (vocals)

=== Backing musicians and production ===
- Jesse Ed Davis – slide guitar, electric guitar
- Nick De Caro – accordion, arrangements
- Sean Fullan – engineer
- Emory Gordy – bass guitar
- Tim Gorman – piano
- Glyn Johns – producer, engineer
- Bernie Leadon – banjo, acoustic guitar
- Doug Sax – engineer
