= Love and Luck (album) =

Studio album by Marty Stuart
- Released: March 15, 1994
- Recorded: 1993–94
- Genre: Country
- Label: MCA
- Producer: Tony Brown, Marty Stuart

Marty Stuart chronology
Let There Be Country (1992)	Love and Luck (1994)	The Marty Party Hit Pack (1995)

Love and Luck is the eighth studio album by American country music singer Marty Stuart, released in 1994. Nearly all the songs were written or co-written by Stuart himself. The album includes the singles "Love and Luck" and "Kiss Me, I'm Gone". "Wheels" is a cover of The Flying Burrito Brothers, and "If I Give My Soul" of Billy Joe Shaver.

Daniel Gioffre of Allmusic gave the album 3 stars out of 5, praising the covers of Shaver and the Byrds and saying that the album "shows his range nicely".

== Track listing ==
No.	Title	Writer(s)	Length
1.	"Love and Luck"	Marty Stuart, Bob DiPiero	3:50
2.	"Kiss Me, I'm Gone"	Stuart, DiPiero	3:02
3.	"Wheels"	Gram Parsons, Chris Hillman	3:11
4.	"I Ain't Giving Up On Love"	Stuart, Harlan Howard	2:46
5.	"That's What Love's About"	Stuart	3:51
6.	"Marty Stuart Visits the Moon" (instrumental)	Stuart	3:17
7.	"Oh, What a Silent Night"	Stuart, Howard	3:29
8.	"Shake Your Hips"	James Moore, Slim Harpo	2:32
9.	"You Can Walk All Over Me"	Stuart, Wayne Perry	2:28
10.	"That's When You'll Know It's Over"	Butch Carr, Russ Zavitson	3:18
11.	"If I Give My Soul"	Billy Joe Shaver	4:21

== Personnel ==
Compiled from liner notes.

Musicians (all tracks except "Love and Luck")

- Mike Brignardello - bass guitar
- Stuart Duncan - fiddle, mandolin
- Béla Fleck - banjo
- Paul Franklin - steel guitar
- John Barlow Jarvis - piano, keyboards
- John Jorgenson - electric guitar, acoustic guitar
- Steve Nathan - synthesizer, keyboards
- Randy Scruggs - acoustic guitar, electric guitar, mandolin
- Marty Stuart - lead vocals, electric guitar, acoustic guitar, mandolin
- Lonnie Wilson - drums

Musicians on "Love and Luck"

- Eddie Bayers - drums
- Vince Gill - background vocals
- Liana Manis - background vocals
- Larry Marrs - background vocals
- Brent Mason - mandolin
- Michael Rhodes - bass guitar
- Ricky Skaggs - background vocals
- Harry Stinson - background vocals

Technical

- Tony Brown - production
- John Guess - recording, mixer
- Glenn Meadows - mastering
- Marty Stuart - production
- Marty Williams - overdubbing

== Chart performance ==
Chart (1994)	Peak position
U.S. Billboard Top Country Albums	28
U.S. Billboard 200	141
Canadian RPM Country Albums	6
