= This One's Gonna Hurt You (For a Long, Long Time) =

1992 single by Travis Tritt and Marty Stuart

Single by Marty Stuart and Travis Tritt

from the album This One's Gonna Hurt You
- Released: June 1, 1992
- Recorded: 1992
- Genre: Country
- Length: 3:28
- Label: MCA
- Songwriter: Marty Stuart
- Producers: Richard Bennett; Tony Brown

Marty Stuart singles chronology
"Burn Me Down" (1992)	"This One's Gonna Hurt You (For a Long, Long Time)" (1992)	"Now That's Country" (1992)

"This One's Gonna Hurt You (For a Long, Long Time)" is a song written by American country music artist Marty Stuart, who recorded the song as a duet with Travis Tritt. It was released in June 1992 as the first single from Stuart's album This One's Gonna Hurt You. It peaked at #7 in the United States, and #6 Canada.

== Music video ==
The music video was directed by John Lloyd Miller. It was filmed in a recording studio with Stuart and Tritt singing the song (accompanied by Stuart's backing band), and is entirely in black and white.

== Chart performance ==
"This One's Gonna Hurt You (For a Long, Long Time)" debuted at number 58 on the U.S. Billboard Hot Country Singles & Tracks for the week of June 6, 1992.

Chart (1992)	Peak position
Canada Country Singles (RPM)	6
US Hot Country Songs (Billboard)	7

=== Year-end charts ===
Chart (1992)	Position
Canada Country Tracks (RPM)	82
US Country Songs (Billboard)	66
