= Love Can Build a Bridge (video) =

Video by The Judds
- Released: November 23, 1990
- Genre: Country
- Length: 60:00
- Label: MPI Media Group
- Producer: Martin Fischer

The Judds chronology
Love Can Build a Bridge (1990)	Love Can Build a Bridge (1990)	Their Finest Collection (1991)

Love Can Build a Bridge is a video album by American country music duo The Judds. It was released on November 23, 1990, by the MPI Media Group and was produced by Martin Fischer. It was the Judds' third video album in their career and contained a series of live recordings from their final tour together. The album eventually certified platinum in the United States.

== Background, content and release ==
In 1990, the Judds announced their disbandment following Naomi Judd's diagnosis of hepatitis C. Later that year, the duo released their final studio album, also called Love Can Build a Bridge. A music video was filmed for the title track and a final tour was also announced. A film crew followed The Judds on their final tour and recorded some of their live concert footage. The results of their footage were inputted into the release of this video album. This included some of the duo's hits from their last album, such as "Born to Be Blue". The video album also contained interviews and scenes from Naomi Judd's wedding to Larry Strickland. The video itself was produced by Martin Fischer and was directed by Bud Schaetzle.

On November 23, 1990, Love Can Build a Bridge was released via the MPI Media Group. It marked the duo's second video album release in their career. It was released as a VHS cassette, containing sixty minutes of material. In 1991, the album was certified platinum in sales from the Recording Industry Association of America for selling over 1,000,000 copies in the United States. It was the Judds' third video album to receive a certification from the RIAA.

== Track listing ==
Love Can Build Bridge (1990)
No.	Title	Length
1.	"This Country's Rockin'"
2.	"Born to Be Blue"
3.	"Rompin' Stompin' Blues"
4.	"Love Can Build a Bridge" (3D performance video)
Total length:		60:00

== Personnel ==
All credits are adapted from the liner notes of Love Can Build a Bridge.

- Martin Fischer – producer
- Michael Salomon – editor
- Bud Schaetzle – director
- Bret Wolcott – associate producer

== Certifications ==
Region	Certification	Certified units/sales
United States (RIAA)	Platinum	100,000^{^}
^{^} Shipments figures based on certification alone.

== Release history ==
Region	Date	Format	Label	Ref.
United States	November 23, 1990	VHS	MPI Media Group	
