= White Mansions =

1978 concept album written by Paul Kennerley

Studio album by Paul Kennerley
- Released: June 1978
- Genre: Country; outlaw country
- Label: A&M
- Producer: Glyn Johns

Paul Kennerley chronology
White Mansions (1978)	The Legend of Jesse James (1980)

White Mansions is a 1978 concept album written by English singer-songwriter Paul Kennerley which imagines the lives of American Southerners in the Confederacy during the Civil War. The songs were performed by country singers, each portraying different characters in an attempt to show the Confederacy and the concept of "Southern pride" through their eyes. The album's vocalists included Waylon Jennings, Jessi Colter, John Dillon and Steve Cash. Eric Clapton played guitar on several tracks. The album charted at #38 on the Country Billboard chart and #181 on the Billboard 200.

In his autobiography, Waylon Jennings claims Kennerley was inspired to compose the songs after hearing "Let’s All Help the Cowboys (Sing the Blues)" on London radio, which had appeared on Jennings 1975 LP Dreaming My Dreams, and declared, "White Mansions is a lovely record, and it touched me in a deeply personal way, as a man whose house is built on a Civil War battlefield and a Southerner. Though it probably went over the heads of its intended audience, making the album was one of my most enjoyable experiences."

The album was re-released in 1999 in a two-for-one package with The Legend of Jesse James, a 1980 concept album conceived by Kennerley.

== Characters ==
The four main characters portrayed in the album are:

- Matthew J. Fuller (played by John Dillon) – The 23-year-old son of a Southern cotton planter, he received a full education in college and military academy. When the Civil War begins, he joins the Confederate Army infantry regiment as a captain.
- Polly Ann Stafford (played by Jessi Colter) – Matthew's significant other; at the start of the war, she begins working in a hospital, tending to wounded and dying soldiers.
- Caleb Stone (played by Steve Cash) – Representing the stereotype of "white trash", Caleb is a man who possesses neither a permanent job nor his own property or land, opting instead for accepting random jobs requiring little skill. He detests the powerful plantation owners of the South and fights against the Union to "preserve his superiority over the blacks".
- The Drifter (played by Waylon Jennings) – The Drifter is the album's narrator. His real name is not known, but the listener is told that he was wounded fighting for Texas in the U.S.-Mexican War; during the Civil War, he doesn't participate in the fighting, traveling from town to town and commenting on the events that unfold instead.

In addition, a single brief track is performed by Rodena Preston's Voices of Deliverance credited as The Slaves; this, as is explained in the liner notes, is symbolic, in that, "despite the fact that they represented over a third of the population of the South, their voice was seldom heard".

Professional ratings
Review scores
Source	Rating
Allmusic	link

== Track listing ==
All songs written or co-written by Paul Kennerley; "White Trash" co-written by Bernie Leadon.

1. "Story to Tell (The Preface)" – 2:52
  - Performed by Polly
2. "Dixie, Hold On" – 3:14
  - Performed by The Drifter
3. "Join Around the Flag" – 2:16
  - Performed by Matthew
4. "White Trash" – 3:55
  - Performed by Caleb
5. "Last Dance and the Kentucky Racehorse" – 5:26
  - Performed by Matthew and Polly
6. "Southern Boys" – 2:58
  - Performed by Caleb
7. "Union Mare and the Confederate Grey" – 3:53
  - Performed by The Drifter
8. "No One Would Believe a Summer Could Be So Cold" – 2:59
  - Performed by Matthew
9. "The Southland's Bleeding" – 4:12
  - Performed by The Drifter
10. "Bring Up the Twelve Pounders" – 0:26
  - Performed by Matthew
11. "They Laid Waste to Our Land" – 2:33
  - Performed by Caleb, Matthew and The Drifter
12. "Praise the Lord" – 1:09
  - Performed by the Slaves
13. "The King Has Called Me Home" – 3:13
  - Performed by Caleb
14. "Bad Man" – 3:04
  - Performed by Matthew
15. "Dixie, Now You're Done" – 3:13
  - Performed by The Drifter
