= Tempted (Waterlillies album) =

Studio album by Waterlillies
- Released: 1994
- Genre: Dance
- Label: Kinetic/Sire/Reprise
- Producer: Ray Carroll

Waterlillies chronology
Envoluptuousity (1992)	Tempted (1994)

Singles from Tempted
- 1. "Tempted" Released: 1994

Tempted is the second, and last, album by the American dance duo Waterlillies. It was released in 1994. The title track was a top 10 hit on the Billboard Dance Club Songs chart.

== Production ==
The album was mostly produced by Ray Carroll. "Take My Breath Away" was written and produced by Sandra Jill Alikas. Tempted includes an a cappella cover of the Carpenters' "Close to You".

The Junior Vasquez remix of "Never Get Enough" topped the Billboard Hot Dance Music/Club Play chart for a week in April 1995. It reached No. 40 on the Billboard Hot Dance Music/Maxi-Singles Sales chart.

== Critical reception ==
Professional ratings
Review scores
Source	Rating
AllMusic	4/5 stars
The Encyclopedia of Popular Music	3/5 stars
Entertainment Weekly	A−
Knoxville News Sentinel	3/5 stars

Trouser Press called the title track "a rousing dance track that garnered a fair share of radio and club play," writing that, "except for a wholly unnecessary a cappella rendition of Bacharach/David’s 'Close to You', the Waterlillies’ sophomore album stretches the boundaries of a limited aesthetic palette with greater returns than the debut." Entertainment Weekly thought that, "on its own, singer-producer Sandra Jill Alikas' voice, a stock-still alto not unlike Enya's, would be just another aural massage, but instrumentalist-producer Ray Carroll’s gently boinging tracks add all sorts of shadings—wanton desire in 'Tempted', all-enveloping warmth in 'I Wanna Be There', sorrow in 'Never Get Enough'." Billboard deemed the title track "a jiggly dance/pop number," writing that "Alikas is an angelic, compelling presence."

The Miami Herald called the album "hypnotic," writing that the musicians "somehow manage to inject heat and heart into mid-tempo dance tunes despite using the tools of the trade—synths and drum machines." The Record determined that "Carroll revels in early-Eighties synth-pop, creating dreamy, if uninvolving, melodies, with drum-machine tracks and the occasional hip-hop rhythm." The New Yorker opined that Tempted "happily evokes both the glory days of the electronic eighties and the recent work of other dance-floor mavens, like Saint Etienne and Opus III, but without their nostalgia."

AllMusic wrote that, "what sounds at first blush like just one more formulaic house-beats-plus-diva dance album turns out, on second listen, to be something a bit more subversive than that."

== Track listing ==
No.	Title	Length
1.	"Tempted"
2.	"I Wanna Be There"
3.	"Never Get Enough"
4.	"Free"
5.	"I Don't Want Your Love"
6.	"Nolion Doll"
7.	"Take My Breath Away"
8.	"Supersonic"
9.	"She Must Be in Love"
10.	"How Does It Feel?"
11.	"Work It Out"
12.	"Close to You"
