= Give a Little Love (The Judds song) =

Single by The Judds

from the album Greatest Hits
- B-side: "Why Don't You Believe Me"
- Released: June 6, 1988
- Genre: Country
- Length: 3:49
- Label: RCA/Curb
- Songwriter(s): Paul Kennerley
- Producer(s): Brent Maher

The Judds singles chronology
"Turn It Loose" (1988)	"Give a Little Love" (1988)	"Change of Heart" (1988)

"Give a Little Love" is a song written by Paul Kennerley and recorded by American country music duo The Judds. It was released in June 1988 as the first single from their Greatest Hits compilation album. The song reached number 2 on the Billboard Hot Country Singles chart.

== Chart performance ==
"Give a Little Love" debuted on the U.S. Billboard Hot Country Singles & Tracks chart the week of June 11, 1988.

=== Weekly charts ===
Chart (1988)	Peak position
US Hot Country Songs (Billboard)	2
Canadian RPM Country Tracks	1

=== Year-end charts ===
Chart (1988)	Position
Canadian RPM Country Tracks	10
US Hot Country Songs (Billboard)	40
