= Rhythm, Country and Blues =

Rhythm Country and Blues

Compilation album by Various artists
- Released: March 1, 1994
- Genre: R&B, country
- Length: 48:12
- Label: MCA
- Producer: Tony Brown; Don Was

Professional ratings
Review scores
Source	Rating
AllMusic	3/5 stars

Rhythm, Country and Blues (a.k.a. Rhythm Country and Blues) is an album featuring duets between R&B and country music artists on classic songs. It was released by MCA Records on March 1, 1994. The album debuted at No. 1 on the Top Country Albums and No. 15 on the Top R&B/Hip-Hop Albums charts. Marty Stuart's rendition of "The Weight" later appeared on his 1995 compilation The Marty Party Hit Pack. The album was nominated for the Country Music Association Award for Album of the Year in 1994.

== Track listing ==
No.	Title	Writer(s)	Performers	Length
1.	"Ain't Nothing Like the Real Thing"	Valerie Simpson, Nickolas Ashford	Vince Gill, Gladys Knight	3:53
2.	"Funny How Time Slips Away"	Willie Nelson	Al Green, Lyle Lovett	4:33
3.	"I Fall to Pieces"	Hank Cochran, Harlan Howard	Aaron Neville, Trisha Yearwood	3:47
4.	"Somethin' Else"	Bob Cochran, Sharon Sheeley	Little Richard, Tanya Tucker	2:50
5.	"When Something Is Wrong with My Baby"	Isaac Hayes, David Porter	Patti LaBelle, Travis Tritt	5:21
6.	"Rainy Night in Georgia"	Tony Joe White	Sam Moore, Conway Twitty	5:13
7.	"Chain of Fools"	Don Covay	Clint Black, The Pointer Sisters	3:42
8.	"Since I Fell for You"	Buddy Johnson	Natalie Cole, Reba McEntire	4:18
9.	"Southern Nights"	Allen Toussaint	Chet Atkins, Allen Toussaint	4:44
10.	"The Weight"	Robbie Robertson	The Staple Singers, Marty Stuart	3:37
11.	"Patches"	Ron Dunbar, General Johnson	George Jones, B. B. King	6:14

== Production ==
- Produced by Tony Brown & Don Was
- Executive producers: Tony Brown, Al Teller, Kathy Nelson
- Recorded, engineered & mixed by Bob Clearmountain
- Mastered by Doug Sax

== Personnel ==
- Drums: Kenny Aronoff (tracks 1, 3, 5, 6, 9–11), Ricky Fataar (track 2), Curt Bisquera (tracks 4, 7), Paul Leim (track 8)
- Percussion: Lenny Castro (tracks 1, 7), Paulinho da Costa (tracks 6, 11), Jamie Muhoberac (track 9)
- Bass: Freddie Washington (track 1), Hutch Hutchinson (tracks 2, 4, 5, 7, 9), Willie Weeks (tracks 3, 6, 10, 11), Glenn Worf (track 8)
- Keyboards, Organ, Piano, Synthesizers: Benmont Tench (tracks 1–4, 6, 7, 11), Nat Adderley (track 1), Billy Preston (track 2), Matt Rollings (tracks 5, 9), Steve Nathan (tracks 6, 8, 10, 11), Barry Beckett (tracks 6, 10, 11), David Briggs (track 8), Allen Toussaint (track 9)
- Acoustic & electric guitars: Mark Goldenberg (tracks 1, 3, 7, 9), Reggie Young (tracks 1, 3, 6, 8, 10, 11), Mabon Hodges (track 2), Randy Jacobs (tracks 2, 7, 9), T-Bone Burnett (track 4), Bernie Leadon (track 5), Larry Byrom (tracks 5, 8), Don Potter (tracks 6, 10, 11), Chet Atkins (track 9)
- Pedal steel: Robby Turner (tracks 1–3, 5, 6, 8, 10, 11)
- Saxophone: Andrew Love (tracks 2, 11), Marty Grebb (track 4)
- Trumpet: Wayne Jackson (tracks 2, 11)
- Horn arrangements: Jim Horn (The Southside Horns) (track 8)
- Strings arranged by David Campbell (tracks 1, 6, 11)
- Background vocals for "Patches": Jonell Mosser, Sweet Pea Atkinson, Sir Harry Bowens and Arnold McCuller

== Charts ==
=== Weekly charts ===
Chart (1994)	Peak position
Canadian Albums (RPM)	13
Canadian Country Albums (RPM)	1
US Billboard 200	18
US Top Country Albums (Billboard)	1
US Top R&B/Hip-Hop Albums (Billboard)	15

=== Year-end charts ===
Chart (1994)	Position
US Billboard 200	80
US Top Country Albums (Billboard)	12
US Top R&B/Hip-Hop Albums (Billboard)	88
