= Academy of Country Music =

Country music organization

- Abbreviation: ACM
- Formation: 1964; 62 years ago
- Type: Music organization
- Headquarters: Nashville, Tennessee, USA
- CEO: Damon Whiteside
- Website: www.acmcountry.com

The Academy of Country Music (ACM) was founded in 1964 in Los Angeles, California as the Country & Western Music Academy. Among the founders were Eddie Miller, Tommy Wiggins, and Mickey and Chris Christensen. They wanted to promote country music in the western 13 states with the support of artists based on the West Coast. Artists such as Johnny Bond, Glen Campbell, Merle Haggard, Roger Miller and others influenced them. A board of directors was formed to govern the academy in 1965.

== History and mission ==
The Country Music Academy (Academy of Country Music) was founded in 1964 on the west coast of the United States. The Academy sought to promote country/western music in the western states; this was in contrast to the Country Music Association, based in Nashville, Tennessee (then the center of the pop-oriented Nashville sound). During the early 1970s, the organization changed its name to the Academy of Country and Western Music and finally to the Academy of Country Music to avoid confusion about whether the organization was a school. Being based in the West, its early membership was largely composed of those country performers based there. This is evidenced by the early awards shows being dominated by Bakersfield artists Buck and Bonnie Owens, and Merle Haggard. Due to the convergence of country and western music into one genre in the late 20th century, the Academy and the Association no longer have a significant distinction in the artists each organization promotes and recognizes.

At the first ceremony held in 1966 (thus predating its Nashville counterpart's award ceremony by a year), honoring the industry and artist from the previous year. This ceremony was the first awards ceremony in country music. Winners from the first ceremony included Kay Adams, Merle Haggard, Bonnie Owens and Buck Owens. Fran Boyd, the first paid employee wife of the late Bill Boyd previous President, created the original signature “hat” trophy. A different, stylized version is used today. During this time, they expanded the efforts by sponsoring “Country Music Caravan” in Los Angeles and promoting their events (also held in Los Angeles) to benefit Prisoners of War and many more benefit golf events to support those in need.

There were many different presidents, CEO and boards, staff members, of the organization nominated and voted on by the membership. The voting was by membership also for the awards and most of the early awards shows were held in CA until a new group took over the running of the organization. Then they moved their annual TV awards broadcasts to Las Vegas, Nevada while maintaining an office space in Encino, California.

Under the leadership of CEO Damon Whiteside the Academy moved its office space to Nashville, Tennessee and closed its West Coast Presence. The awards show has since moved to Frisco, Texas in collaboration with the Dallas Cowboys.

== Awards ==
The awards are “dedicated to honoring and showcasing the biggest names and emerging talent in the country music industry.” Typically, the ACM Awards are presented in April or May and recognize the achievements from the previous year. The most prestigious awards are for Artist of the Decade and Entertainer of the Year as well as Pioneer. There are a number of other awards to recognize male and female vocalists, albums, videos, songs and musicians.

== See also ==
- Country Music Association
- Country Music Hall of Fame
- Grand Ole Opry
