= Tempted (Marty Stuart song) =

Single by Marty Stuart

from the album Tempted
- B-side: "I'm Blue I'm Lonesome"
- Released: August 12, 1991
- Genre: Country
- Length: 3:16
- Label: MCA
- Songwriters: Marty Stuart, Paul Kennerley
- Producers: Richard Bennett, Tony Brown

Marty Stuart singles chronology
"Till I Found You" (1991)	"Tempted" (1991)	"Burn Me Down" (1992)

"Tempted" is a song co-written and recorded by American country music artist Marty Stuart. It was released in August 1991 as the third single and title track from the album Tempted. They reached #5 on the Billboard Hot Country Singles & Tracks chart. It was written by Stuart and Paul Kennerley.

== Chart performance ==
Chart (1991)	Peak position
Canada Country Singles (RPM)	4
US Hot Country Songs (Billboard)	5

=== Year-end charts ===
Chart (1991)	Position
Canada Country Tracks (RPM)	73
