= Marty Stuart =

American musician (born 1958)

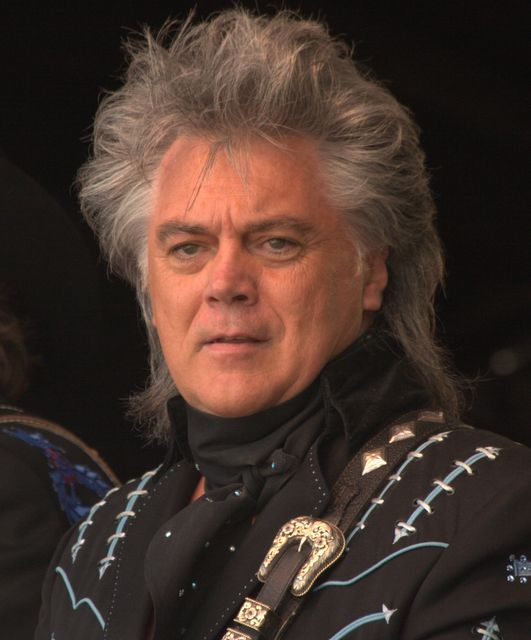
- Stuart at MerleFest in 2012

Background information
- Born: John Marty Stuart; September 30, 1958 (age 68); Philadelphia, Mississippi, U.S.
- Genres: Country; bluegrass
- Occupations: Singer; songwriter
- Instruments: Vocals; guitar; mandolin
- Years active: 1968–present
- Labels: Sugar Hill, Columbia, MCA, Universal South, Superlatone, Ridge Runner
- Member of: The Fabulous Superlatives
- Formerly of: The Rock & Roll Cowboy Band
- Spouses: Cindy Cash (m. 1983; div. 1988) Connie Smith (m. 1997)
- Website: martystuart.net

John Marty Stuart (born September 30, 1958) is an American country and bluegrass music singer, songwriter, and musician. Active since 1968, Stuart initially toured with Lester Flatt, and then in Johnny Cash's road band before beginning work as a solo artist in the early 1980s. He is known for his combination of rockabilly, country rock, and bluegrass music influences, his frequent collaborations and cover songs, and his distinctive stage dress.

His greatest commercial success came in the first half of the 1990s on MCA Records Nashville. Stuart has recorded over 20 studio albums, and has charted over 30 times on the Billboard Hot Country Songs charts. His highest chart entry is "The Whiskey Ain't Workin'", a duet with Travis Tritt.

Stuart has won five Grammy Awards out of 16 nominations. He is also a member of the Grand Ole Opry and Country Music Hall of Fame and Museum.

== Early life ==
External audio
- Marty Stuart: Keeper Of Country Music's Cowboy Couture, interviewed by Terry Gross on Fresh Air, 51:08, October 1, 2014.

John Marty Stuart was born in Philadelphia, Mississippi, on September 30, 1958. He learned to play guitar and mandolin as a child, and by age 12, he had joined a gospel band called The Sullivans. While a member of this band, Stuart met mandolinist Roland White, a member of Lester Flatt's backing band; White invited Stuart to perform with Flatt at a concert in Delaware in 1972, which led to him becoming a regular member of that band. He continued to tour in this capacity until Flatt retired in 1978, and recorded an independent album called With a Little Help from My Friends that same year. After this, Stuart performed with Vassar Clements and Doc Watson before joining Johnny Cash's band in 1980.

In 1982 he released a second album called Busy Bee Cafe on Sugar Hill Records. The album was composed of a jam session that included a number of country and bluegrass performers such as Cash, Watson, and Earl Scruggs. In 1985, Stuart accompanied Johnny Cash to Memphis and played on the Class of '55 album that also featured Carl Perkins, Roy Orbison, and Jerry Lee Lewis. At the end of the session, Perkins presented Stuart with his guitar. Later that year, Stuart left Cash's band and landed a recording contract with Columbia Records.

== Recording career ==
Stuart released his self-titled debut album on Columbia in 1985. The album accounted for Stuart's first chart entry on Billboard Hot Country Songs charts with his first single release, "Arlene". Three other singles charted from the album in 1986: "Honky Tonker" and "All Because of You", both written by Steve Forbert, and Stuart's own "Do You Really Want My Lovin'". However, these songs were less successful on the charts. The success of "Arlene" helped Marty to receive a nomination by the Academy of Country Music Awards for Top New Male Vocalist, losing to Randy Travis. AllMusic writer Jim Worbois gave the album a mixed review, stating that it was "Not a great album, but made somewhat more interesting by some of the people appearing on the record and the inclusion of two Steve Forbert songs." He recorded a second album for Columbia titled Let There Be Country, which charted two singles in 1988: Merle Haggard's composition "Mirrors Don't Lie" and "Matches". Due to the underperformance of the singles, Columbia chose not to release the album, and Stuart exited the label to return to Mississippi.

=== 1989-91: Beginning of MCA Records tenure ===
After briefly rejoining the Sullivans, he returned to Nashville and signed with MCA Records in 1989. That label issued the album Hillbilly Rock that year. Co-produced by Tony Brown and session guitarist Richard Bennett, the album charted four singles on Hot Country Songs. First was a cover of Cash's "Cry! Cry! Cry!", followed by "Don't Leave Her Lonely Too Long", which Stuart wrote with Kostas. While these were unsuccessful on the charts, the album's title track (written by Paul Kennerley) became Stuart's first top-10 country hit in 1990. The album's final release was "Western Girls", which Stuart also co-wrote. Hillbilly Rock was certified gold by the Recording Industry Association of America (RIAA) in 1997 for shipments of 500,000 copies.

His second MCA album, Tempted, followed in 1991. The album charted four singles on Hot Country Songs between 1991 and 1992: "Little Things", "Till I Found You", "Tempted", and "Burn Me Down", of which all except "Till I Found You" reached the top 10. Bennett and Brown stayed on as producers, with the former also contributing alongside Stuart on both guitar and mandolin. Kennerley and Kostas contributed as both songwriters and backing vocalists; also performing backing vocals on some tracks were Billy Thomas and Ray Herndon, who were also recording on MCA in McBride & the Ride at the time. Jana Pendragon of AllMusic gave the album four-and-a-half stars out of five, comparing it to Dwight Yoakam's Hillbilly Deluxe in style and saying, "Stuart kicks country-pop in its well-defined hindquarters[…]But Stuart is just as deadly when he slows things down and does a ballad."

Also in 1991, Stuart co-wrote a song with Travis Tritt called "The Whiskey Ain't Workin'". Recorded on the latter's 1991 album It's All About to Change, this song was released in between "Tempted" and "Burn Me Down". It went on to become Stuart's highest chart entry, reaching number two on Hot Country Songs in early 1992. It also won Stuart his first Grammy Award, for Best Country Collaboration with Vocals that year. This song's success also led to the two touring in 1992 as the No Hats Tour, because unlike most contemporary country musicians, neither Tritt nor Stuart sported a cowboy hat.

=== 1992-95: End of MCA tenure ===
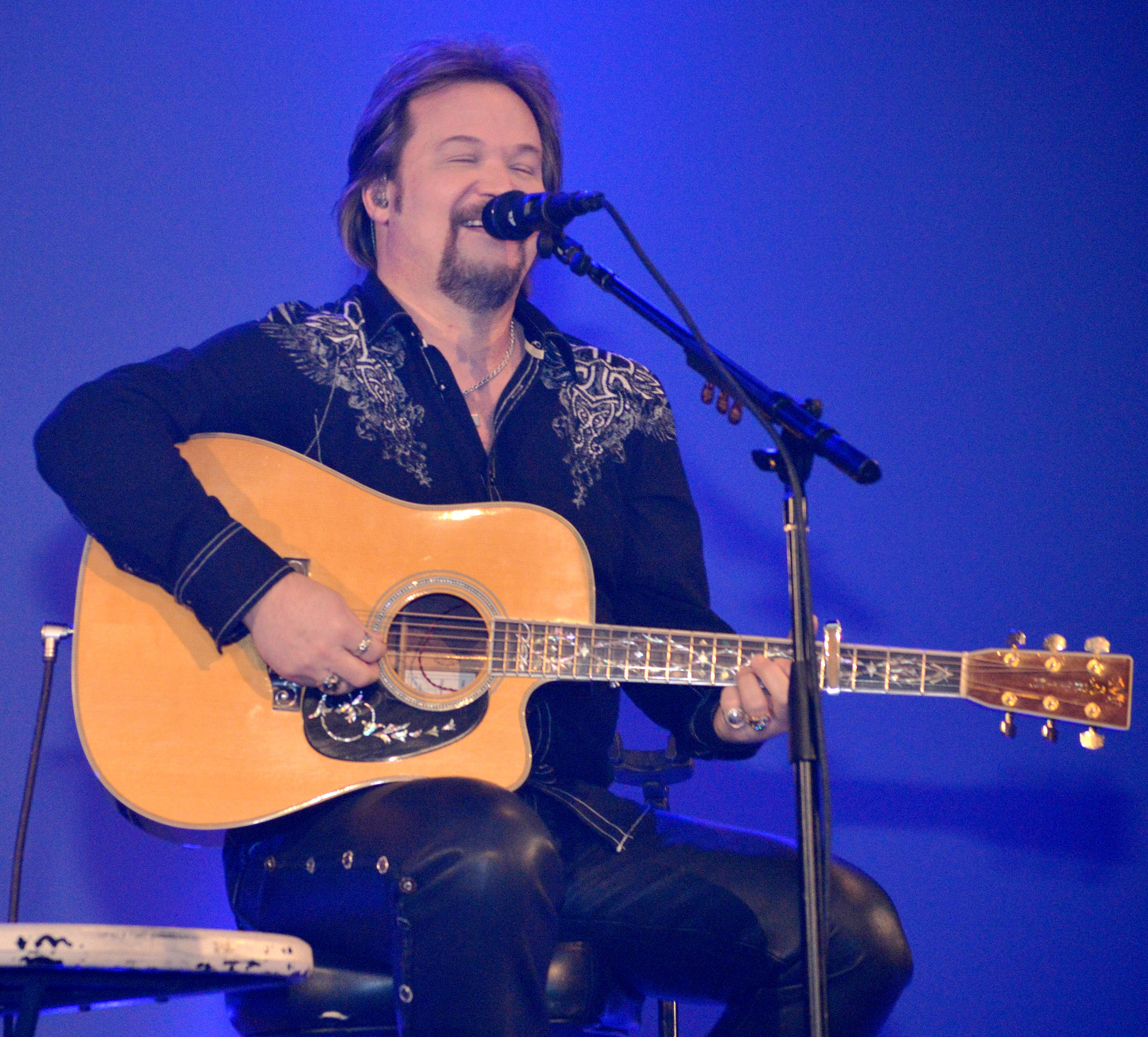
Stuart is a frequent collaborator of Travis Tritt's, pictured here in 2014.

His next MCA album, This One's Gonna Hurt You, came out in 1992. The lead single "This One's Gonna Hurt You (For a Long, Long Time)", also a duet with Tritt, was a top-10 hit in 1992, but the followup singles, "Now That's Country", "High on a Mountain Top", and "Hey Baby", were less successful. Kennerley and Cash were once again among the contributing vocalists, while Ashley Cleveland and Pam Tillis both sang backing vocals on "High on a Mountain Top". Johnny Cash provided duet vocals on "Doin' My Time", while the track "Me and Hank and Jumpin' Jack Flash" sampled voice recordings of Lester Flatt, Hank Williams, and Ernest Tubb. Alanna Nash of Entertainment Weekly rated the album "A", finding the "stylistic mix" superior to preceding albums, noting influences of bluegrass, Southern rock, rockabilly, and blues in his delivery and song choices. Also in 1992, Columbia issued Let There Be Country. This One's Gonna Hurt You was certified gold by the RIAA in 1993. Stuart won his second Grammy Award in 1993, in the category of Best Country Instrumental Performance, as one of several featured artists on Asleep at the Wheel's cover of "Red Wing" on their 1993 album Tribute to the Music of Bob Wills and the Texas Playboys.

Love and Luck was his next album, released in 1994. Only one single, "Kiss Me, I'm Gone", made top 40 from the project. Stuart co-produced the album with Brown, while also contributing on guitar, mandolin, and songwriting. The album's opening title track featured Vince Gill, Ricky Skaggs, and Harry Stinson on backing vocals. Also included were two covers: Billy Joe Shaver's "If I Give My Soul" and The Flying Burrito Brothers' "Wheels", as well as the mandolin instrumental "Marty Stuart Visits the Moon". Daniel Gioffre of AllMusic highlighted these three tracks in particular as being among the strongest on the album. Nash rated the album "B", stating, "As a singer, Marty Stuart has all the zip of unbuttered toast, and as a writer, too many of his songs float aimlessly...Yet Stuart has genuine love for the early country greats and injects his own work with such impassioned strains of old hillbilly styles, that he charms in spite of his limitations."

Following this album, MCA issued a compilation called The Marty Party Hit Pack in 1995, which contained singles from his previous MCA albums, as well as "The Whiskey Ain't Workin'", the previously unreleased "The Likes of Me" and "If I Ain't Got You", and two cover songs previously found on multi-artist tribute albums released in 1994. These were a rendition of Elvis Presley's "Don't Be Cruel", featuring The Jordanaires and previously found on It's Now or Never: The Tribute to Elvis, and The Band's "The Weight", featuring The Staple Singers and previously found on Rhythm, Country and Blues. Both of these cover songs were produced by Don Was, while Don Cook handled production on the two new songs. "The Likes of Me" was previously cut by Conway Twitty on his 1993 album Final Touches, on which Cook was also a producer. Both of these new songs were issued as singles in 1995, but neither entered the country music top 40. Jay Orr of New Country magazine criticized "The Likes of Me" and the two cover songs, but otherwise found the album a "neat summation" of Stuart's music. The Marty Party Hit Pack became Stuart's fourth and final gold album in 1998.

Stuart released Honky Tonkin's What I Do Best in 1996, which produced two more minor chart entries in the title track (another duet with Tritt) and "You Can't Stop Love" that year. The title track also won Stuart a Vocal Event of the Year award from the Country Music Association. Nash rated the album "A−", finding an influence of the Beatles in "Thanks to You" and of Delta blues in "The Mississippi Mudcat and Sister Sheryl Crow".

== Career since the late 1990s ==
Stuart released another album in 1999 called The Pilgrim. It charted only one single that year with "Red, Red Wine and Cheatin' Songs". A concept album based around a love triangle, the album featured vocal contributions from Pam Tillis, George Jones, and Emmylou Harris, as well as a poem recited by Johnny Cash. An uncredited review of the album in AllMusic was largely favorable, stating that "no one's idea of a commercial country album, one has to admire the sheer ambition of the project, as well as the guts it took MCA Records to release what amounts to a unique and deeply personal artistic vision." After this album proved to be commercially unsuccessful, Stuart left MCA in 2000.

His next album was 2003's Country Music, released on Columbia Records. For this album, Stuart assembled a new backing band called Marty Stuart and His Fabulous Superlatives, consisting of Harry Stinson on drums, Kenny Vaughan on guitar, and Brian Glenn on bass guitar. Included on the albums were covers of Porter Wagoner's "A Satisfied Mind", Carl Butler and Pearl's "Sundown in Nashville", and Johnny Cash's "Walls of a Prison", as well as the Merle Haggard duet "Farmer's Blues". Two singles from the album both charted: "If There Ain't, There Ought'a Be" and "Too Much Month (At the End of the Money)". Thom Jurek of AllMusic wrote that the album "is relentless in both its attack and in the pleasure it provides to the listener. There are hot licks everywhere, with great songs, vocals, and a tapestry of moods, textures, and shades that serve to leave one impression: Stuart's radical experimentation of the last ten years has resulted in his finest moment thus far."

In 2005, Stuart launched a custom record label, Superlatone Records, to issue overlooked Southern gospel and roots music recordings. Stuart released three critically acclaimed collections on Superlatone, Souls' Chapel, Badlands, and Live at the Ryman. In October 2005, Stuart released a concept album, Badlands: Ballads of the Lakota, which pays tribute to the Sioux culture in what is now South Dakota. In 2007, Stuart produced Porter Wagoner's final album on the predominantly punk label Epitaph Records.

In August 2022, he signed with Snakefarm Records, his first record deal in nearly 10 years. He also went on tour with the Fabulous Superlatives in Europe, with scheduled performances in Sweden, Norway, Denmark, Germany, and Switzerland. Sam Williams, Hank Williams' grandson, was his supporting act.

== The Fabulous Superlatives ==
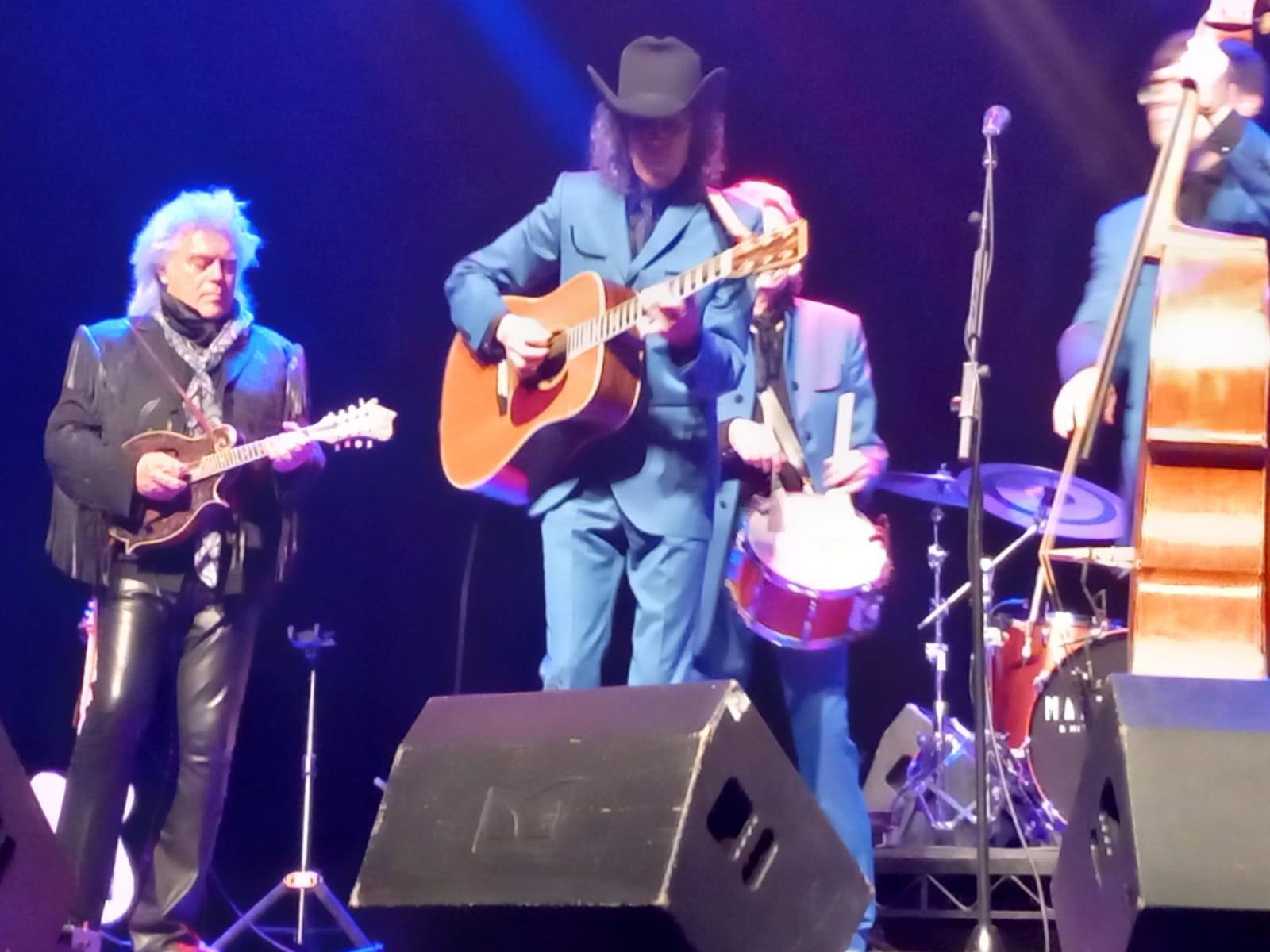
The Fabulous Superlatives in 2022: from left to right Stuart, Vaughan, Stinson, Scruggs

The Fabulous Superlatives, Marty Stuart's band since 2002, includes him on guitar and mandolin, Kenny Vaughan on guitar, and Harry Stinson on drums, and from 2002 until 2008, Brian Glenn on bass. From 2008 until 2015, Paul Martin was on bass. In 2015, Chris Scruggs replaced Paul Martin on bass, and also played steel guitar. Every member also sings.

== Musical style ==
In a 1992 article for Entertainment Weekly, Kate Meyers wrote that Stuart "considers himself more a stylist than a singer, meaning he gets by with a mix of approaches...rather than relying on a fantastic voice of his own", citing Johnny Cash, Bill Monroe, and Muddy Waters as his main musical influences. Stuart's musical image in the 1990s was also defined by his distinct clothing and hairstyle. Meyers described him as having a "striking black mane, speckled with well-earned gray...[o]ften tied in a black or pink bandana headband", faded jeans from Levi Strauss & Co., a black T-shirt, cowboy boots, a concho belt, and a rhinestone-studded suit jacket designed by Nudie Cohn (sometimes termed the "Nudie suit").

== Equipment and memorabilia ==
Stuart is known for his extensive collection of country music memorabilia. Some of his collection was exhibited at the Tennessee State Museum in 2007 as "Sparkle and Twang: Marty Stuart's American Musical Odyssey." The exhibit later appeared at the Rock and Roll Hall of Fame and Museum in Cleveland, Ohio, and at the Arkansas Statehouse Museum. In early 2018, Stuart co-curated, along with the Grammy Museum, an exhibit at the Woody Guthrie Center in Tulsa, Oklahoma, entitled "Marty Stuart's Way Out West: A Country Music Odyssey". The exhibit highlighted the West Coast impact on country music, featuring items by artists including Johnny Cash, Merle Haggard, Buck Owens, and Stuart himself. Many of the items in the exhibit came from Stuart's private collection, including the last portrait of Cash (taken by Stuart four days before Cash died).

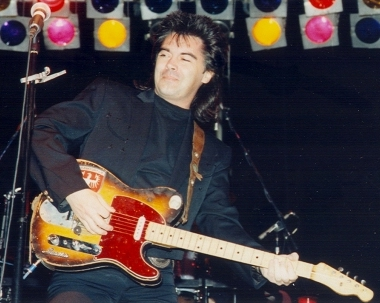
Marty Stuart, January 1993, with Clarence White's B-Bender guitar

Yvonne and Mavis Staples of the Staple Singers gave one of their father "Pops" Staples' guitars to Marty Stuart after Pop's death. Mavis Staples explained, "My father was Marty's godfather. My sisters and I took him in as our brother. He's the only one that I've heard who -- when he's playing guitar, he sounds like Pop. He can play just like him."

Stuart's guitars also include 'Clarence', the familiar two-tone Fender Telecaster, once owned by Clarence White. This instrument is the original B-Bender guitar, built and designed by White and Gene Parsons around 1967, to allow the guitarist to manually raise the guitar's 'B' string one whole step to play in a style similar to a pedal steel guitar. Stuart bought this unique guitar in 1980 from White's widow, and continued to play it in concert, as of 2025.

== The Marty Stuart Show ==
Stuart is host of The Marty Stuart Show, which features traditional country music in the vein of The Porter Wagoner Show, Flatt and Scruggs, the Wilburn Brothers Show, and Hee Haw. The Marty Stuart Show began airing at 8:00 pm on November 1, 2008, on cable's RFD-TV. Although no new episodes have been produced as of 2022, the network continues to air old episodes of the show under the name The Best of the Marty Stuart Show.

Each episode features music by Stuart and his band the Fabulous Superlatives. Stuart hosts and produces the 30-minute episodes, with WSM disc jockey and Grand Ole Opry announcer Eddie Stubbs serving as the show's emcee.

== Country Music Foundation ==
Stuart is a member of the board of the Country Music Foundation and is a past president. Stuart has also been a member of the Grand Ole Opry since 1992. On August 12, 2020, Stuart was selected to be inducted into the Country Music Hall of Fame.

== Personal life ==
Stuart's first wife was Johnny Cash's daughter Cindy, to whom he was married from 1983 to 1988.

Since July 8, 1997, Stuart has been married to country artist Connie Smith, whom he had admired since his childhood. Stuart described encountering Smith many years earlier, after attending her concert: "I met Connie when I was 12 years old. She came to the Indian reservation in my hometown of Philadelphia, Mississippi, to work at a fair. She hasn't changed a bit. She looked great then and she looks great now." Stuart said he told his mother then that he was going to marry Connie Smith. Smith explains how they have sustained their marriage : "Make the Lord the center ... and commit."

== Awards and nominations ==
Year	Association	Category	Nominated work	Result
1985	Academy of Country Music	Top New Male Vocalist	Marty Stuart	Nominated
1990	Country Music Association	Video of the Year	"Hillbilly Rock"	Nominated
1991	Academy of Country Music	Top Vocal Duet	Marty Stuart and Travis Tritt	Nominated
1992	Academy of Country Music	Top Vocal Duet	Marty Stuart and Travis Tritt	Nominated
1992	Grammy Awards	Best Country Collaboration with Vocals	"The Whiskey Ain't Workin'" (with Travis Tritt)	Won
1992	Country Music Association Awards	Vocal Event of the Year	"The One's Gonna Hurt You" (with Travis Tritt)	Won
1994	Country Music Association Awards	Album of the Year	Asleep at the Wheel: Tribute to the Music of Bob Wills & the Texas Playboys	Nominated
1994	Country Music Association Awards	Album of the Year	Rhythm, Country and Blues	Nominated
1994	Country Music Association Awards	Vocal Event of the Year	"The Devil Comes Back to Georgia" (with Charlie Daniels Band, Travis Tritt, Mark O'Connor and Johnny Cash)	Nominated
1996	Country Music Association Awards	Vocal Event of the Year	"Honky Tonkin's What I Do Best" (with Travis Tritt)	Nominated
1996	Academy of Country Music	Top Vocal Duet	Marty Stuart and Travis Tritt	Nominated
1998	Academy of Country Music	Vocal Event of the Year	Same Old Train (with various artists)	Won
1999	Grammy Awards	Best Country Collaboration with Vocals	Same Old Train (with various artists)	Won
1999	Country Music Association	Vocal Event of the Year	Same Old Train (with various artists)	Nominated
2000	Golden Globe Awards	Best Original Score	All the Pretty Horses	Nominated
2002	Grammy Awards	Best Country Instrumental Performance	"Foggy Mountain Breakdown"	Won
2004	International Bluegrass Music Awards	Recorded Event of the Year^{[A]}	Livin', Lovin', Losin': Songs of the Louvin Brothers	Won
2005	Americana Music Honors & Awards	Lifetime Achievement Award for Performance	Marty Stuart	Won
2008	International Bluegrass Music Awards	Recorded Event of the Year^{[B]}	Everett Lilly & Everybody and Their Brother	Won
2011	Grammy Awards	Best Country Instrumental Performance	"Hummingbyrd"	Won
2011	Grammy Awards	Best Country Collaboration with Vocals	"I Run To You" (with Connie Smith)	Nominated
2017	Americana Music Honors & Awards	Duo/Group of the Year	Marty Stuart and his Fabulous Superlatives	Won

A. shared with Joe Nichols, Rhonda Vincent, Emmylou Harris, Rodney Crowell, James Taylor, Alison Krauss, Vince Gill, Terri Clark, Merle Haggard, Carl Jackson, Ronnie Dunn, Rebecca Lynn Howard, Glen Campbell, Leslie Satcher, Kathy Louvin, Pamela Brown Hayes, Linda Ronstadt, Patty Loveless, Jon Randall, Harley Allen, Dierks Bentley, Larry Cordle, Jerry Salley, Dolly Parton, Sonya Isaacs, Del McCoury, Pam Tillis, Johnny Cash and The Jordanaires.
B. shared with Everett Lilly, Bea Lilly, Charles Lilly, Daniel Lilly, Mark Lilly, Rhonda Vincent, Billy Walker, Ronnie McCoury, Rob McCoury, David Ball, Charlie Cushman, Larry Stevenson, Joe Spivey, Eddie Stubbs, Jason Carter, Dickey Lee, Freddie Weller, Mike Bub, Rad Lewis, Andy May, Darrin Vincent, Marcia Campbell, Clay Rigdon, Eric Blankenship and Bill Wolfenbarger.

Awards
Preceded by Chris Hillman	AMA Lifetime Achievement Award for Performing; 2005	Succeeded by Alejandro Escovedo
