= Eddie Miller (songwriter) =

American songwriter

Edward Monroe Miller (December 10, 1919 – April 11, 1977) was an American country music songwriter, best known for co-writing the song, "Release Me" which has been a hit for numerous artists. Miller also co-founded both the Country and Western Music Academy and the Nashville Songwriters Association International.

== Early life and education ==
Miller was born in Camargo, Oklahoma and worked as a locomotive engineer before becoming a songwriter. Although he was never educated beyond high school, he taught songwriting at the University of Tennessee.

== Career ==
His first published song, written in the mid-1930s, was "I Love You, Honey." In 1946, he co-wrote what would become his most successful song, "Release Me," though at first he could not get anyone to record it. Eventually he recorded it himself, and it was covered by several singers and was commercially successful.

In the 1960s Miller co-founded the Country and Western Music Academy in Hollywood, as well as the Nashville Songwriters Association International, serving as the organization's president for the first two years.

Miller wrote a country opera, "The Legend of Johnny Brown," and a gospel opera, "It Was Jesus." "Legend of Johnny Brown" was a concept project that was released on Tower Records. The project featured Kay Adams as Mary Lou, Ray Sanders as Sheriff Tom, Alice Rene as Jezebel Jones and Jerry Naylor as Johnny Brown. Miller pitched this project to Capitol Records, with a demo version he had already recorded with Alice Rene performing all of the female vocals. Miller actually wanted Rene for the Mary Lou character, but Capitol Records went with Kay Adams. Miller pressed the label to use Rene and secured her the part of Jezebel Jones. The irony is, that the only recorded version Adams had to learn this music, were the original demos previously recorded by Rene.

He died in Nashville, Tennessee at age 57.

== Awards and recognition ==
Miller received Performance Awards from BMI for "There She Goes" (1954), for "Thanks a Lot" (1964), and "Release Me" (1954, 1962, 1967, 1968, 1969, 1971, 1972, and 1973, as well as a Most Performed Song award in 1968 and a Pop & Country Performance Award in 1974).

His publisher, Four Star Publishing, gave him platinum records for "Release Me" and "There She Goes."

The Oklahoma Music Association awarded him its All Time Great Songwriter's Award.

In 2018, the Academy of Country Music Awards posthumously honoured Miller (alongside Mickey and Chris Christensen) with the Mae Boren Axton Award.

== Published songs ==
- "After Loving You"
- "Burn Me Down"
- "A Church, a Courtroom & Then Goodbye"
- "Down Came the Rains"
- "Hungry For Love"
- "I've Loved and Lost Again"
- "I Love You Honey"
- "Jesus, Let Me Write You a Song"
- "Playboy"
- "Release Me"
- "Release Me (From My Sin)"
- "Thanks a Lot"
- "There She Goes"
- "This Old Heart"
- "Three Cigarettes in an Ashtray"
