= Paul Kennerley =

English songwriter (born 1948)

- Born: 1948 (ages 77-78); Hoylake, Cheshire, England
- Genre: Country
- Occupation: Songwriter
- Instrument: Guitar
- Years active: 1972–present
- Labels: A&M; Spinout

Paul Kennerley (born 1948) is an English songwriter living in Nashville, Tennessee.

== Biography ==
Kennerley was born in Hoylake, Cheshire, England, in 1948, where his father was a director of a company based in nearby Liverpool. He was the youngest of four children. At the age of 8, he attended a preparatory boarding school in Cheshire, followed by Stowe School in Buckinghamshire, and Copford Glebe in Essex.

After leaving school, Kennerley apprenticed in the design studios of a Liverpool advertising agency. In 1969, he spent several months at an agency in New York City before returning to London, where he worked as a layout artist.

For as early as he can remember, he had an over-arching passion for music. In the early 70's, Kennerley held a secondary job managing the London "pub rock" band The Winkies. 1974 he left advertising in order to pursue and develop his songwriting. In 1975, he became enraptured by country music, having heard a Waylon Jennings record. "It really excited me and led me to discover many other artists and an entire genre I had never listened to before." Kennerley recalled.

Although he wanted only to write country songs, his lack of experience of rural American life and culture seemed inauthentic. That led him to write songs set in historical settings that eventually became the much lauded Civil War concept album White Mansions.

His songs have been featured in hit films such as A Star is Born (2018) and Thelma & Louise and have been recorded by the greats of music including Emmylou Harris, Linda Ronstadt, Ringo Starr, Waylon Jennings, Johnny Cash, Nanci Griffith, Dave Edmunds, Brenda Lee, Glen Campbell, The Everly Brothers, Kenny Rogers, The Nitty Gritty Dirt Band, Chet Atkins and Mark Knopfler, Bradley Cooper and Lady Gaga, Martina McBride, The Judds, Marty Stuart, Patty Loveless, Charlie Daniels, The Highwaymen, Dierks Bentley, Lonnie Donegan, Levon Helm, Rick Danko, Solomon Burke, Don Williams, The Crickets, and more.

=== Recordings ===
White Mansions

Kennerley's first major project was White Mansions, a 1978 concept album set in the Confederate States of America during the American Civil War. The project was picked up by A&M Records, with Glyn Johns producing. A number of notable artists recorded the music, including Waylon Jennings, Jessi Colter, Steve Cash and John Dillon of the Ozark Mountain Daredevils, and Eric Clapton. The Guardian described White Mansions as "the first and perhaps best outlaw country rock Civil War concept album ever recorded."

The Legend of Jesse James

In 1980, Kennerley released his second concept album, The Legend of Jesse James. It featured more notable artists, including Johnny Cash, Emmylou Harris, Charlie Daniels, Albert Lee and Levon Helm. The Legend of Jesse James tells the story of the outlaw's life through various artists. It features Levon Helm as Jesse James and Johnny Cash as Frank James, with other notable performers including Emmylou Harris, Charlie Daniels, and Rosanne Cash. Produced by Glyn Johns, the album follows a chronological narrative and has been re-released as a two-CD set with Kennerley's previous album, White Mansions, both of which were produced by Glyn Johns.

Misery with a Beat

In 1995, Kennerley released the EP Misery with a Beat which, featured Richard Bennett, Billy Bremner, and himself on guitar, Michael Rhodes on bass, and Chad Cromwell on drums with songs including "Love Match"; - "Heart Full of Rain"; - "Tryin' to Get Over You" "She was Mine" - and - "The Heartbreak Kind" (co-written with Marty Stuart).

Paul Kennerley Demos

In 2025, Kennerley released the double CD, Paul Kennerley Demos, a collection of his original rough and ragged homemade versions of songs that went on to be recorded by greats such as Emmylou Harris, Johnny Cash, Waylon Jennings, The Judds, Marty Stuart, Tanya Tucker, Levon Helm, Patty Loveless, Charlie Daniels, John Anderson, The Highwaymen, The Class of '55, Solomon Burke, Chet Atkins, Mark Knopfler, Linda Ronstadt, Bradley Cooper and Lady Gaga, Wynonna and others. Several of the songs became number one and top five records on the Billboard Country Charts. On the album, all of the songs were sung and recorded by Kennerley with the exception of "You're the Kind of Trouble," which was sung by The Wrights, and "Diggin' My Grave" which was sung by Morgane Stapleton.

=== Personal life ===
In 1979, Kennerley married Jenny Dugan Chapman in London. The couple had two children, a daughter Marisha and a son Charles. They divorced in 1984. In 1983, Kennerley moved to Nashville where he continued to have songs recorded by country music artists. In 1985, he married Emmylou Harris. They were divorced in 1991. Kennerley continues to live in Nashville, Tennessee.

=== Awards ===
Kennerley was named Broadcast Music Incorporated (BMI) Country Writer of the Year in 1989.

== Songs used in television shows ==
TV programme	Song(s)
Northern Exposure	"Poor Boy Blues"
The Sopranos	"Heaven Only Knows"
Nashville	"Ball and Chain", "You're the Kind of Trouble"
Animal Kingdom	"That's the Truth"
Country Music	"Born to Run"

== Songs used in films ==
Film	Song
Baja Oklahoma	"In My Dreams"
Thelma and Louise	"I Don't Want to Love You (But I Do)"
The Lost Boys	"Crazy Old Soldier"
A Star Is Born	"Diggin’ My Grave"
Wild Rose	"Born to Run"

== Top 20 songs on the Billboard Country Charts written by Kennerley ==
Song	Recorded by	Year	Achieved	Co-written
"Have Mercy"	The Judds	1985	No 1	
"Cry Myself to Sleep"	The Judds	1986	No 1	
"Young Love (Strong Love)"	The Judds	1989	No 1	*
"Let Me Tell You About Love"	The Judds	1989	No 1	*
"Give a Little Love"	The Judds	1988	No 2	
"Born to Run"	Emmylou Harris	1982	No 3	
"Walking Shoes"	Tanya Tucker	1990	No 3	
"In My Dreams"	Emmylou Harris	1984	No 4	
"Blue Side of Town"	Patty Loveless	1989	No 4	*
"Chains of Gold"	Sweethearts of the Rodeo	1987	No 5	
"Tempted"	Marty Stuart	1991	No 5	*
"One Hundred and Two"	The Judds	1991	No 6	*
"Tell Me True"	Juice Newton	1988	No 8	*
"Hillbilly Rock"	Marty Stuart	1990	No 8	
"Heartbreak Hill"	Emmylou Harris	1989	No 8	*
"Little Things"	Marty Stuart	1991	No 8	*
"One Man Woman"	The Judds	1990	No 8	
"Till I Found You"	Marty Stuart	1991	No 12	*
"White Line"	Emmylou Harris	1985	No 13	*
"Heaven Only Knows"	Emmylou Harris	1989	No 14	
"Western Girls"	Marty Stuart	1990	No 20	*

NOTE ( 18 of the above songs received BMI Awards, 15 of which were 1 million plays, 4 were 2 million plays and 1 was a 3 million play award )

== Discography ==
=== Recordings ===
- 1978: White Mansions (A&M) - all songs written by Kennerly and performed by other artists
- 1979: The Legend of Jesse James (A&M) - all songs written by Kennerly and performed by other artists
- 1998: Misery with a Beat EP (Spinout)
- 2025: Paul Kennerley Demos

=== As producer ===
- 1985: Emmylou Harris - The Ballad of Sally Rose (Warner Bros.)
- 1986: Emmylou Harris - Thirteen (Warner Bros.)

=== As composer ===
Year	Song	Artist	Album	Co-written with
1980	"Southern Boys"	Matchbox	Midnight Dynamos	
1981	"Born to Run"	Emmylou Harris	Cimarron	
1982	"Gonna Write a Letter"	Waylon Jennings	Black on Black	
1983	"Feel So Right"	Dave Edmunds	Information	
1983	"The Watch on My Wrist"	Dave Edmunds	Information	
1983	"I'll Be Faithful to You"	The Kendalls	Movin Train	
1983	"That's the Truth"	Johnny Cash	Johnny 99	
1983	"Brand New Dance"	Johnny Cash & June Carter	Johnny 99	
1983	"Let It Roll"	Charlie Daniels	A Decade of Hits	
1983	"Crazy Old Soldier"	David Allan Coe	Hello in There	Troy Seals
1983	"In My Dreams"	Emmylou Harris	White Shoes	
1984	"The First in Line"	The Everly Brothers	EB 84	
1984	"I'll Be Faithful to You"	Glen Campbell	Letter to Home	
1984	"Where Would I Be (Without You)"	Waylon Jennings	Never Could Toe the Mark	
1984	"Rock and Roll Shoes"	Ray Charles	Friendship	Graham Lyle
1984	"Crazy Old Soldier"	Ray Charles	Friendship	Troy Seals
1984	"Looking for Suzanne"	Waylon Jennings	Waylon's Greatest Hits Vol. 2	
1984	"Nothing Can Hurt Me Now"	Gail Davies	Where Is a Woman to Go	Bob McDill
1984	"Take That Woman Away"	John Anderson	Eye of a Hurricane	
1984	"I'll Be Faithful to You"	Don Williams	Cafe Carolina	
1985	"I've Got Me a Woman"	John Anderson	Tokyo, Oklahoma	
1985	"Have Mercy"	The Judds	Rockin' with the Rhythm	
1985	"Cry Myself to Sleep"	The Judds	Rockin' with the Rhythm	
1985	"Feels So Right"	Brenda Lee	Feels So Right	
1985	"I'll Be Faithful"	Marie Osmond	There's No Stopping Your Heart	
1985	"Welfare Line"	The Highwaymen	Highway Man	
1985	"You Make It Feel So Right"	Steve Wariner	Greatest Hits	
1986	"Chains of Gold"	Sweethearts of the Rodeo	Sweethearts of the Rodeo	
1986	"I'll Be Faithful to You"	Don Williams	Lovers and Best Friends	
1986	"Sweetheart of the Pines"	Emmylou Harris	Thirteen	Emmylou Harris
1986	"When I Was Yours"	Emmylou Harris	Thirteen	Emmylou Harris
1986	"I Had My Heart Set on You"	Emmylou Harris	Thirteen	Rodney Crowell
1986	"I've Got Me a Woman"	Waylon Jennings	Will the Wolf Survive	
1986	"We Remember the King"	Class of '55	Memphis Rock & Roll Homecoming	
1987	"When He Calls"	Emmylou Harris	Angel Band	
1987	"Lying in Her Arms"	John Anderson	Blue Skies Again	John Anderson
1987	"Let It Shine on Me"	Nanci Griffith	Lone Star State of Mind	
1987	"Blue Side of Town"	Rosie Flores	Rosie Flores	Hank DeVito
1987	"Woman Walk the Line"	Highway 101	Highway 101	Emmylou Harris
1987	"Tell Me True"	Juice Newton		Brent Maher
1988	"Blue Side of Town"	Patty Loveless	Honky Tonk Angel	Hank DeVito
1988	"Give a Little Love"	The Judds	Greatest Hits	
1988	"Heaven Only Knows"	Emmylou Harris	Bluebird	
1988	"Heartbreak Hill"	Emmylou Harris	Bluebird	Emmylou Harris
1989	"Away from You"	Jason & the Scorchers	Thunder and Fire	Jason Ringenberg
1989	"One Man Woman"	The Judds	River of Time	
1989	"Young Love"	The Judds	River of Time	Kent Robbins
1989	"Let Me Tell You About Love"	The Judds	River of Time	Carl Perkins and Brent Maher
1989	"When I Get My Rewards"	Nitty Gritty Dirt Band with Levon Helm	Will the Circle be Unbroken: Volume 2	
1989	"Mary Danced with Soldiers"	Nitty Gritty Dirt Band with Emmylou Harris	Will the Circle be Unbroken: Volume 2	
1989	"The Tears That I Cry"	John Anderson	Too Tough to Tame	John Anderson
1989	"Hillbilly Rock"	Marty Stuart	Hillbilly Rock	
1989	"Western Girls"	Marty Stuart	Hillbilly Rock	Marty Stuart
1989	"Easy to Love, Hard to Hold"	Marty Stuart	Hillbilly Rock	Marty Stuart
1990	"Poor Boy Blues"	Chet Atkins & Mark Knopfler	Neck and Neck	
1990	"Sweet Dreams of You"	Emmylou Harris	Brand New Dance	John David
1990	"Brand New Dance"	Emmylou Harris	Brand New Dance	
1990	"Walking Shoes"	Tanya Tucker	Tennessee Woman	
1990	"I Don't Want to Love You, (But I Do)"	Kelly Willis	Well Travelled Love	
1990	"Looking for Someone Like You"	Kelly Willis	Well Travelled Love	Kevin Welch
1990	"One Hundred and Two"	The Judds		Wynonna Judd & Don Potter
1990	"Blue Memories"	Patty Loveless	On Down the Line	Karen Brooks
1990	"I've Got to Stop Loving You (And Start Living Again)"	Patty Loveless	On Down the Line	
1990	"I'll Be Faithful to You"	Marie Osmond	The Best of Marie Osmond	
1991	"Trail of Tears"	Tanya Tucker	What Do I Do with Me	
1991	"Till I Found You"	Marty Stuart	Tempted	Hank DeVito
1991	"Tempted"	Marty Stuart	Tempted	Marty Stuart
1991	"Little Things"	Marty Stuart	Tempted	Marty Stuart
1992	"Woman Walk the Line"	Trisha Yearwood	Hearts in Arm	Emmylou Harris
1992	"Live with Jesus"	Wynonna Judd	Wynonna	
1992	"Danger Ahead"	Tanya Tucker	Can't Run from Yourself	
1992	"Down Home"	Marty Stuart	This One's Gonna Hurt You	Marty Stuart
1992	"Hey Baby"	Marty Stuart	This One's Gonna Hurt You	Marty Stuart
1992	"Letter of Love"	Jason Ringenberg	One Foot in the Honky Tonk	
1992	"Feels So Right"	Jason Ringenberg	One Foot in the Honky Tonk	
1992	"The Blue Side of Town"	The Del McCoury Band	Blue Side of Town	Hank DeVito
1993	"World Without You"	Kelly Willis	Kelly Willis	Kelly Willis
1993	"Sugar Babe"	Billy Burnette	Coming Home	Billy Burnette
1993	"Heart Trouble"	Martina McBride	The Way That I Am	
1994	"One More Chance"	Barry Tashian & Holly Tashian	Straw into Gold	Barry Tashian
1995	"Love Match"	Paul Kennerley	Misery with a Beat	
1995	"Heart Full of Rain"	Paul Kennerley	Misery with a Beat	
1995	"Tryin' to Get Over You"	Paul Kennerley	Misery with a Beat	
1995	"She Was Mine"	Paul Kennerley	Misery with a Beat	
1995	"The Heartbreak Kind"	Paul Kennerley	Misery with a Beat	Marty Stuart
1996	"Draggin' My Heart Around"	Travis Tritt	The Restless Kind	Marty Stuart
1996	"Double Trouble"	Travis Tritt	The Restless Kind	Marty Stuart & Travis Tritt
1996	"Country Girls"	Marty Stuart	Honky Tonkin's What I Do Best	Marty Stuart
1996	"Rocket Ship"	Marty Stuart	Honky Tonkin's What I Do Best	Marty Stuart
1998	"Heartbreak Kind"	Linda Ronstadt	We Ran	Marty Stuart
1998	"Born to Run"	Emmylou Harris	Spyboy	
1999	"He Was Mine"	Linda Ronstadt & Emmylou Harris	Western Wall: The Tucson Sessions	
1999	"Love Match"	Buddy Miller	Cruel Moon	
2000	"When I Get My Rewards"	The Waco Brothers	Electric Waco Chair	
2001	"Rodeo or Mexico"	Garth Brooks	Scarecrow	Bryan Kennedy & Garth Brooks
2002	"I'll Be Faithful to You"	Nitty Gritty Dirt Band with Emmylou Harris	Will the Circle Be Unbroken	
2003	"Draggin' My Heart Around"	Patty Loveless	On Your Way Home	Marty Stuart
2003	"Heartbreak Hill"	Albert Lee	Heartbreak Hill	Emmylou Harris
2003	"Heaven Only Knows"	Albert Lee	Heartbreak Hill	
2003	"Born to Run"	Albert Lee	Heartbreak Hill	
2003	"In My Dreams"	Albert Lee	Heartbreak Hill	
2003	"Jupiter Rising"	Emmylou Harris	Stumble into Gracee	
2003	"Heart Trouble"	Wanda Jackson	Heart Trouble	
2003	"It Happens Every Time"	Wanda Jackson	Heart Trouble	Joe Brown
2003	"Lonely for You"	Wanda Jackson	Heart Trouble	Marty Stuart
2003	"If You Want Me Around"	Marty Stuart	Country Music	Marty Stuart
2005	"When I Get My Just Rewards"	Rick Danko	Cryin' Heart Blues	
2005	"Young Love"	Wynonna Judd	Her Story	Kent Robbins
2005	"Let Me Tell You About Love"	Wynonna Judd	Her Story	Carl Perkins and Brent Maher
2006	"Honey, Where's the Money Gone?"	Kenny Rogers	Water and Bridges	Barry Tashian
2006	"Honey, Where's the Money Gone?"	Solomon Burke	Nashville	Barry Tashian
2006	"You're the Kind of Trouble"	Solomon Burke	Nashville	Shannon & Adam Wright
2008	"Got Me a Woman"	Levon Helm	Dirt Farmer	
2008	"A Train Robbery"	Levon Helm	Dirt Farmer	
2008	"The Wishing Well"	Joe Brown	More of the Truth	Shawn Camp
2008	"No Cadillac"	Joe Brown	More of the Truth	
2009	"Diamond in My Crown"	Patty Loveless	Mountain Soul II	Emmylou Harris
2009	"Live with Jesus"	The Oak Ridge Boys	A Gospel Journey	
2010	"Fallin' for You"	Dierks Bentley	Up on the Ridge	Shawn Camp
2010	"You're the Kind of Trouble"	The Holmes Brothers	Feed My Soul	Shannon & Adam Wright
2011	"A Train Robbery"	Levon Helm	Ramble at the Ryman	
2014	"When I Get My Rewards"	Harry Dean Stanton	Partly Fiction	
2014	"Rock and Roll Shoes"	Johnny Cash	Out Among the Stars	Graham Lyle
2014	"Lonely for You"	Bruce Robison & Kelly Willis	Our Year	Kelly Willis
2016	"Born to Run"	Lee Ann Womack	The Life & Songs of Emmylou Harris	
2018	"Diggin' My Grave"	Lady Gaga & Bradley Cooper	A Star Is Born	
2019	"Born to Run"	Jessie Buckley	Wild Rose	
2021	"Born to Run"	Emmylou Harris & The Nash Ramblers	Ramble in Music City	
2022	"Night After Night"	Daniel Tashian	Night After Night	Daniel Tashian and eight others
2023	"Cry Myself to Sleep"	Wynonna and Trisha Yearwood	A Tribute to the Judds	
2023	"Have Mercy"	LeAnn Rimes	A Tribute to the Judds	
2023	"Young Love (Strong Love)"	Ella Langley & Jamey Johnson	A Tribute to the Judds	Kent Robbins
2023	"Let Me Tell You About Love"	Carl Perkins & Raul Malo	A Tribute to the Judds	Carl Perkins and Brent Maher
2024	"Time on My Hands"	Ringo Starr	Look Up	Daniel Tashian and T-Bone Burnett
2025	"Night After Night"	Nitty Gritty Dirt Band	Night After Night (EP)	Daniel Tashian

* Class of 55 (Carl Perkins, Jerry Lee Lewis, Roy Orbison and Johnny Cash))
