= Richard Bennett (guitarist) =

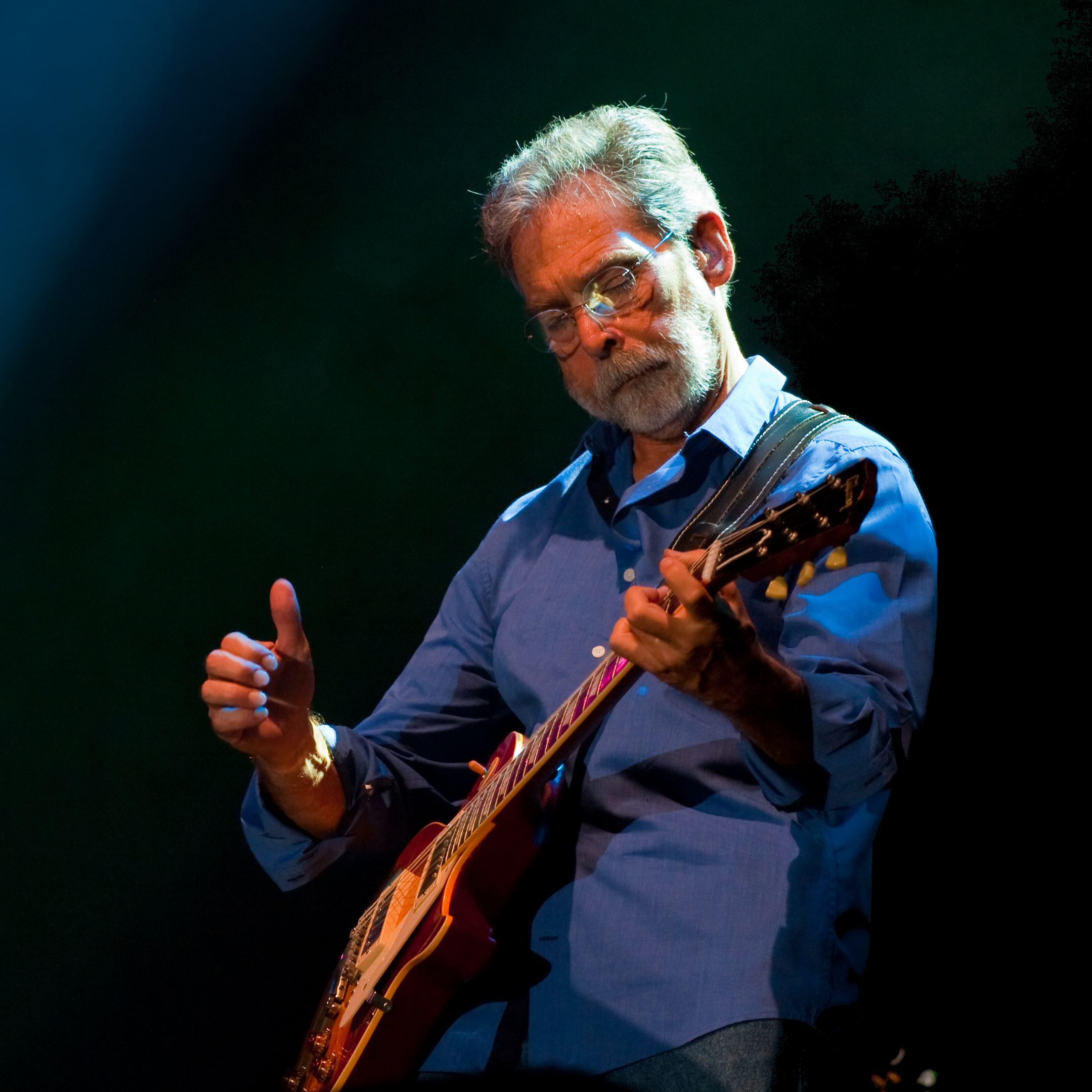
- Performing on tour with Mark Knopfler; Zwolle, The Netherlands, 2013

Background information
- Born: July 22, 1951 (age 73); Chicago, Illinois, U.S.
- Genres: Rock, country, Hawaiian
- Occupation(s): Musician, producer
- Instrument(s): Guitar, ukulele
- Website: www.richard-bennett.com

Richard Bennett (born July 22, 1951) is an American guitarist and record producer. As a touring sideman, he performed with Neil Diamond for seventeen years and Mark Knopfler since 1994. As a session musician, he has worked with Billy Joel, Barbra Streisand, Rodney Crowell, and Vince Gill. He has produced albums for Steve Earle, Emmylou Harris, Marty Stuart, and Kim Richey.

== Career ==
Bennett began his career playing clubs in Phoenix, Arizona, in the late 1960s, until he was discovered by Al Casey, which took him to Los Angeles where he had a lengthy career as a studio musician. He played on a few tracks on Neil Diamond's 1971 album Stones; Moods was his first full album with him, and he played on every Diamond album until 1987 and toured with him for 17 years. He also co-wrote with Diamond, including the up-tempo "Forever in Blue Jeans" from the 1978 album You Don't Bring Me Flowers, which reached the Top 20.

On 1975's "Let Your Love Flow" by The Bellamy Brothers, Bennett plays lead guitars. It also features in a UK Barclay's Bank commercial. The song was written by Larry Williams, a member of Neil Diamond's road crew.

Formed in the late 1970s as Rodney Crowell's road band, The Notorious Cherry Bombs' original members include guitarists Vince Gill and Richard Bennett, keyboardist Tony Brown, steel guitarist Hank DeVito, drummer Larrie Londin and bassist Emory Gordy, Jr. With a modified lineup the musicians went to the studio in early 2004 to record The Notorious Cherry Bombs, their first album as a band.

From the liner notes of Bennett's solo album, Themes From A Rainy Decade, Mark Knopfler writes, "For almost ten years now I've felt very lucky having Richard Bennett as a pal and as a member of the band. His quiet, self-effacing manner hides an encyclopedic knowledge of all kinds of roots and rock music, from Hillbilly to Hawaiian, played effortlessly on a variety of instruments which appear out of a flight case as big as an Airstream trailer... May his cracking guitar playing find a place in your life as it has in mine."

Bennett's electric guitar intro to Emmylou Harris' "Heaven Only Knows" (from her Bennett-produced Bluebird album) was the first sound heard on the 2004 season-opening episode of The Sopranos.

Bennett contributes electric sitar to the 2007 album American Standard by Thelonious Moog.

== Personal life ==
Bennett's brother is Jon "Bermuda" Schwartz, drummer for "Weird Al" Yankovic since 1980.
