= 20 Greatest Hits (Kenny Rogers album) =

1983 compilation album by Kenny Rogers

Greatest hits album by Kenny Rogers
- Released: 1983
- Recorded: 1983
- Genre: Country
- Length: 72:51
- Label: Liberty Records

Kenny Rogers chronology
We've Got Tonight (1983)	20 Greatest Hits (1983)	Eyes That See in the Dark (1983)

20 Greatest Hits is a compilation album by Kenny Rogers released by Liberty Records in 1983.

== Overview ==
20 Greatest Hits marks Rogers' third compilation album as a solo artist. This compilation covers the entire span of Rogers' glorious chart run through the late 1970s and early 1980s.

Among the 20 tracks on the album is Rogers' early smash hit "Lucille", which made Rogers a world-famous solo superstar. "The Gambler" – Rogers' chart-topping story song – also makes an appearance. The single that first appeared on Rogers' first solo Greatest Hits collection in 1980, "Lady" also makes it onto the album, as does "Love Lifted Me" from 1976 (his first solo single in ten years following his split with The First Edition).

Also included are popular duets with Sheena Easton ("We've Got Tonight"), Kim Carnes ("Don't Fall in Love with a Dreamer"), and Dottie West ("Till I Can Make It on My Own").

Based on hit singles from the Billboard charts, this is the strongest Kenny Rogers single disc compilation album released. Another version came in 1987 (see below). It was also re-released on CD in 1994.

== Track listing ==
No.	Title	Writer(s)	Original Album	Length
1.	"Lucille"	Roger Bowling/Hal Bynum	1977 – Kenny Rogers	3:38
2.	"Lady"	Lionel Richie	1980 – Greatest Hits	3:54
3.	"Love Lifted Me"	Preston Ross/Howard Smith	1976 – Love Lifted Me	3:43
4.	"We've Got Tonight" (with Sheena Easton)	Bob Seger	1983 – We've Got Tonight	3:51
5.	"Scarlet Fever"	Mike Dekle	1983 – We've Got Tonight	3:57
6.	"Love or Something Like It"	Steve Glassmeyer/Rogers	1978 – Love or Something Like It	2:51
7.	"She Believes In Me"	Steve Gibb	1978 – The Gambler	4:09
8.	"Ruby Don't Take Your Love to Town"	Mel Tillis	original version on the 1969 album Ruby Don't Take Your Love To Town with The First Edition. This is a 1978 re-recording from Ten Years of Gold	2:59
9.	"Don't Fall in Love with a Dreamer" (with Kim Carnes)	Kim Carnes/Dave Ellingson	1980 – Gideon	4:00
10.	"You Were a Good Friend"	Carnes/Ellingson	1980 – Gideon	3:54
11.	"The Gambler"	Don Schlitz	1978 – The Gambler	3:32
12.	"Through the Years"	Steve Dorff/Marty Panzer	1981 – Share Your Love	4:21
13.	"Daytime Friends"	Ben Peters	1977 – Daytime Friends	3:08
14.	"You Decorated My Life"	Debbie Hupp/Bob Morrison	1979 – Kenny	3:37
15.	"'Til I Can Make It on My Own" (with Dottie West)	George Richey/Billy Sherrill/Tammy Wynette	1979 – Classics	3:19
16.	"Reuben James"	Barry Etris/Alex Harvey	original version is on the 1969 album Ruby Don't Take Your Love To Town with The First Edition. This is a 1978 re-recording from Ten Years of Gold	2:45
17.	"Coward of the County"	Bowling/Billy Edd Wheeler	1979 – Kenny	4:17
18.	"I Don't Need You"	Rick Christian	1981 – Share Your Love	3:27
19.	"Something's Burning"	Mac Davis	original version is on the 1970 album Something's Burning with The First Edition. This is a 1978 re-recording from Ten Years of Gold	3:49
20.	"Love Will Turn You Around"	David Malloy/Rogers/Thom Schuyler/Even Stevens	1982 – Love Will Turn You Around	3:40

== Chart performance ==
Chart (1983)	Peak position
U.S. Billboard Top Country Albums	16
U.S. Billboard 200	22
Australian Albums Chart	2
Canadian RPM Top Albums	29

=== Year-end charts ===
Chart (2001)	Position
Canadian Country Albums (Nielsen SoundScan)	40

Chart (2002)	Position
Canadian Country Albums (Nielsen SoundScan)	59

== Reissue ==
25 Greatest Hits

Greatest hits album by Kenny Rogers
- Released: 1987
- Recorded: 1987
- Genre: Country
- Length: 93:17
- Label: Liberty Records

Kenny Rogers chronology
I Prefer the Moonlight (1987)	25 Greatest Hits (1987)	Greatest Hits (1988)

In 1987, Liberty issued a new disc featuring five additional tracks, covering Rogers' newest hits up to that point. The new tracks are the last five, including the title single "Love Is What We Make It" and "Sweet Music Man", the latter penned by Rogers himself.

=== Track listing ===
Track times differ from the 1983 release and all tracks are re-presented here.

1. Lucille
2. Lady
3. Love Lifted Me
4. We've Got Tonight
5. Scarlet Fever
6. Love or Something Like It
7. She Believes in Me
8. Ruby, Don't Take Your Love to Town
9. Don't Fall in Love With a Dreamer
10. You Were a Good Friend
11. Gambler
12. Through the Years
13. Daytime Friends
14. You Decorated My Life
15. 'Til I Can Make It on My Own
16. Reuben James
17. Coward of the County
18. I Don't Need You
19. Something's Burning
20. Love Will Turn You Around
21. Abraham, Martin and John/Precious Memories
22. Love Is What We Make It
23. Green, Green Grass of Home
24. Desperado
25. Sweet Music Man
