= Greatest Hits (1980 Kenny Rogers album) =

Greatest hits album by Kenny Rogers
- Released: September 23, 1980
- Genre: Country
- Length: 42:35 (US); 43:28 (UK)
- Label: Liberty
- Producer: Richard Landis

Kenny Rogers chronology
Gideon (1980)	Greatest Hits (1980)	Share Your Love (1981)

Alternative cover
- UK release, titled Lady

Greatest Hits (sometimes referred to as Kenny Rogers' Greatest Hits) is the second compilation album by American singer-songwriter Kenny Rogers. It was released in September 1980 and issued by Liberty Records. The album marks Rogers' first release after United Artists Group merged with Liberty. The album was certified 12× Platinum by the Recording Industry Association of America (RIAA), denoting shipments of 12 million copies in the US.

== History ==
The album reached No. 1 on both the Pop and Country charts in the US and featured three singles that were not included on any of Rogers' studio albums: "Lady" (written and produced specifically for Rogers by Lionel Richie, which was a No. 1 hit single in the same year), "Love The World Away" (a top five country and top 20 pop hit that was featured on the soundtrack of the 1980 film Urban Cowboy) and "Long Arm of the Law" (a lesser known, but still relatively popular song among Rogers' loyal fan base).

The album features a further nine hit singles from Rogers' career, omitting a number of others (including "Daytime Friends", "Sweet Music Man" and "Love or Something Like It"). This didn't stop the album from being a massive success and confirmed Rogers' status as one of the most best-selling musicians in the US. It remains the best selling compilation release in country music, beating out Garth Brooks' 1994 limited-time-availability release The Hits.

In the UK, the album was sold with the same artwork under the title Lady but differed slightly in the track listing, omitting "Ruby, Don't Take Your Love to Town" and "Reuben James" in favor of "Goodbye Marie" and "Sail Away".

The album is not the only Kenny Rogers release to be called Greatest Hits. In 1971, while with The First Edition, an album under that title was released. Since 1980, many other collections by Rogers have been called Greatest Hits, such as a 1985 Reader's Digest box set and the 1988 collection of his RCA material. However, this 1980 collection on Liberty was the first solo offering by Rogers to be given this designation.

In 1983, when Rogers changed labels to RCA Records, Liberty quickly issued 20 Greatest Hits, a more complete look at Rogers' hit list. However, both albums remained in catalog side by side for over two decades. Also in 1983, HBO re-released the Greatest Hits package on special picture discs. The track listing remained identical to the 1980 US release.

In the UK, where both 1981's "Lady" and the earlier The Kenny Rogers Singles Album had served as the two main compilations of Rogers' hit material, the original 1980 US version of this album was issued under its original title of "Greatest Hits" for the first time in 1983, exclusively on the new Compact Disc format.

Professional ratings
Review scores
Source	Rating
Allmusic	link
Billboard	(unrated)

== Track listings ==
=== US release ===
Side one
No.	Title	Writer(s)	Original release	Length
1.	"The Gambler"	Don Schlitz	The Gambler, 1978	3:32
2.	"Lady"	Lionel Richie	Previously unreleased	3:54
3.	"Don't Fall in Love with a Dreamer" (With Kim Carnes)	Kim Carnes, Dave Ellingson	Gideon, 1980	3:39
4.	"Ruby, Don't Take Your Love to Town"	Mel Tillis	Ten Years of Gold, 1977	2:48
5.	"She Believes in Me"	Steve Gibb	The Gambler, 1978	4:11
6.	"Coward of the County"	Roger Bowling, Billy Edd Wheeler	Kenny, 1979	4:18
Total length:				22:19

Side two
No.	Title	Writer(s)	Original release	Length
1.	"Lucille"	Bowling, Hal Bynum	Kenny Rogers, 1977	3:34
2.	"You Decorated My Life"	Debbie Hupp, Bob Morrison	Kenny, 1979	3:37
3.	"Reuben James"	Barry Etris, Bob Morrison	Ten Years of Gold, 1977	2:37
4.	"Love the World Away"	Morrison, Johnny Wilson	Urban Cowboy (soundtrack), 1980	3:11
5.	"Every Time Two Fools Collide" (With Dottie West)	Jan Dyer, Jeff Tweel	Every Time Two Fools Collide, 1978	3:00
6.	"Long Arm of the Law"	Bowling, Wheeler	Previously unreleased	4:17
Total length:				20:16

=== UK release (Lady) ===
Side one
No.	Title	Length
1.	"Lady"	3:51
2.	"Don't Fall in Love with a Dreamer"	3:39
3.	"Lucille"	3:34
4.	"She Believes in Me"	4:11
5.	"You Decorated My Life"	3:37
6.	"Coward of the County"	4:18
Total length:		23:10

Side two
No.	Title	Length
1.	"Goodbye Marie" (from Kenny, 1979, written by Mel McDaniel)	2:47
2.	"Every Time Two Fools Collide"	3:00
3.	"Sail Away" (from Love or Something Like It, 1978, written by Rafe van Hoy)	3:31
4.	"The Gambler"	3:32
5.	"Love the World Away"	3:11
6.	"Long Arm of the Law"	4:17
Total length:		20:18

=== Year-end charts ===
Chart (1980)	Position
New Zealand Albums (RMNZ)	32
Chart (1981)	Position
New Zealand Albums (RMNZ)	48

== Certifications ==
Region	Certification	Certified units/sales
Canada (Music Canada)	Diamond	1,000,000^{^}
Finland (Musiikkituottajat)	Gold	20,000
Japan	—	120,000
New Zealand (RMNZ)	Platinum	15,000^{^}
Philippines (PARI)	Gold	10,000
United States (RIAA)	12× Platinum	12,000,000^{^}
^{^} Shipments figures based on certification alone.

== See also ==
- List of best-selling albums in the United States
