= The Kenny Rogers Singles Album =

Compilation album by Kenny Rogers
- Released: 1979
- Genre: Country
- Length: 23:01 (Side 1); 24:57 (Side 2); 47:58 Total
- Label: United Artists

Kenny Rogers chronology
Classics (1979)	The Kenny Rogers Singles Album (1979)	Kenny (1979)

Professional ratings
Review scores
Source	Rating
Music Week	4/4 stars

The Kenny Rogers Singles Album is the seventh studio album by Kenny Rogers.

== Overview ==
This album was issued in the UK by United Artists Records in 1979 and was the second Kenny Rogers album to reach the pop UK Albums Chart Top 20 . It featured every one of his singles to make the UK Pop Top 75 to that point. It is fairly similar to 1977's Ten Years Of Gold album issued in the United States, but it featured four more songs that were hits in 1978, such as "The Gambler" and "She Believes In Me".

In Australia, the album was issued with the same track listing and album art and was known as The Best of Kenny Rogers and peaked at number 4 on the charts.

== Track listing ==
=== Side 1 ===
1. "Ruby, Don't Take Your Love To Town" (Mel Tillis) [2:49]
  (original version from the 1969 album Ruby, Don't Take Your Love to Town with The First Edition)
2. "Reuben James" (Barry Etris, Alex Harvey) [2:38]
  (original version from the 1969 album Ruby, Don't Take Your Love to Town with The First Edition)
3. "But You Know I Love You" (Mike Settle) [3:13]
  (original version from the 1969 album The First Edition '69 with The First Edition)
4. "Something's Burning" (Mac Davis) [4:18]
  (original version from the 1970 album Something's Burning with The First Edition)
5. "Just Dropped In" (Mickey Newbury) [3:18]
  (original version from the 1967 album The First Edition with The First Edition)
6. "Lucille" (Roger Bowling, Hal Bynum) [3:38]
  (from the 1977 album Kenny Rogers)
7. "Daytime Friends" (Ben Peters) [3:07]
  (from the 1977 album Daytime Friends)

=== Side 2 ===
1. "While the Feeling's Good" (Bowling, Freddie Hart) [4:00]
  (from the 1976 album Love Lifted Me)
2. "Love Lifted Me" (Preston Ross, Howard Smith) [3:44]
  (from the 1976 album Love Lifted Me)
3. "Today I Started Loving You Again" (Merle Haggard, Bonnie Owens) [3:04]
  (original version from the 1972 album Back Roads with The First Edition)
4. "Love or Something Like It" (Steve Glassmeyer, Rogers) [2:52]
  (from the 1978 album Love or Something Like It)
5. "Sail Away" (Rafe Van Hoy) [3:30]
  (from the 1978 album Love or Something Like It)
6. "The Gambler" (Don Schlitz) [3:32]
  (from the 1978 album The Gambler)
7. "She Believes in Me" (Steve Gibb) [4:14]
  (from the 1978 album The Gambler)

== Chart performance ==
Chart (1979)	Peak position
Australian (Kent Music Report) Albums	4

== Certifications ==
Region	Certification	Certified units/sales
Australia (ARIA)	Platinum	50,000^{^}
^{^} Shipments figures based on certification alone.

== See also ==
- Ten Years Of Gold
- The Kenny Rogers Story
