= Ten Years of Gold =

Compilation album by Kenny Rogers
- Released: January 1978
- Recorded: 1975–1977
- Length: 16:33 (Side 1); 17:56 (Side 2); 34:29 (Total)
- Label: United Artists
- Producer: Larry Butler, Kenny Rogers

Kenny Rogers chronology
Daytime Friends (1977)	Ten Years of Gold (1978)	Every Time Two Fools Collide (with Dottie West) (1978)

Professional ratings
Review scores
Source	Rating
Christgau's Record Guide	C

Ten Years of Gold is the fourth studio album by Kenny Rogers issued in 1978. It spent two years on the album chart and peaked at #33. In 1997, the album was certified 4× Platinum by the RIAA.

== Overview ==
As his fourth solo album, Ten Years of Gold is a collection of ten songs spanning the last decade. The album features solo re-recordings of hits Rogers had with The First Edition. These new versions were recorded at Jack Clement Recording Studio "B" using Rogers' road band "Bloodline" (listed below). Side 1 of the LP contained all the re-recordings. Though Rogers had already scored three other solo hits, "Lucille", "Daytime Friends", "While The Feeling's Good" and "Love Lifted Me" are all that represent his recent work. Rogers still had the rights to the First Edition's original hit recording of "Today I Started Loving You Again", which was previously released on their 1972 album Back Roads; hence that recording was chosen as the closing track of Ten Years of Gold.

There were two different versions of the cover art. One had Rogers' name in white next to the title and a mock pasted photo on the back. On the second pressing the photo is retouched to look like it is in a gold frame.

== Track listing ==
Side one
No.	Title	Writer(s)	Length
1.	"Ruby, Don't Take Your Love To Town"	Mel Tillis	2:53
2.	"Reuben James"	Barry Etris, Alex Harvey	2:41
3.	"But You Know I Love You"	Mike Settle	3:16
4.	"Something's Burning"	Mac Davis	4:19
5.	"Just Dropped In (To See What Condition My Condition Was In)"	Mickey Newbury	3:24

Side two
No.	Title	Writer(s)	Length
1.	"Lucille" (from Kenny Rogers [1976])	Roger Bowling, Hal Bynum	3:41
2.	"Daytime Friends" (from Daytime Friends [1977])	Ben Peters	3:14
3.	"While the Feeling's Good" (from Love Lifted Me [1976])	Bowling, Freddie Hart	4:02
4.	"Love Lifted Me" (from Love Lifted Me [1976])	Preston Ross, Howard Smith	3:49
5.	"Today I Started Loving You Again" (original version from Back Roads [1972] with The First Edition)	Merle Haggard, Bonnie Owens	3:10

- Note: Rogers composed the two new verses to "Love Lifted Me" although he is not credited for this.

== Personnel ==
- Guitar: Tommy Allsup, Jimmy Capps, Fred Carter Jr., Johnny Christopher, Jim Colvard, Randy Dorman,
  T. G. Engel, Rick Harper, Kelso Herston, Kenny Rogers, Billy Sanford, Jerry Shook, Reggie Young.
  Steel Guitar: Pete Drake
- Bass: Mike Leach, Joe Osborn
- Keyboards: Steve Glassmeyer, Gene Golden, Hargus "Pig" Robbins, Edgar Struble, Bobby Wood
- Drums: Jerry Carrigan, Bobby Daniels
- Strings: Byron Bach, Brenton Banks, George Binkley, Marvin Chantry, Roy Christensen, Carl Gorodetzky,
  Lennie Haight, Sheldon Kurland, Wilfred Lehmann, Bob Moore, Steven Maxwell Smith, Gary Vanosdale
- Backing Vocals – Buzz Cason, Bobby Daniels, Don Gant, Steve Glassmeyer, Gene Golden, The Jordanaires,
  Edgar Struble, Bergen White

== Chart performance ==
Chart (1977)	Peak position
U.S. Billboard Top Country Albums	1
U.S. Billboard 200	33
Australian (Kent Music Report) Albums	68
Canadian RPM Top Albums	23
