= Short Stories (Kenny Rogers album) =

Compilation album by Kenny Rogers
- Released: November 15, 1985
- Recorded: 1976–1983
- Genre: Country
- Length: 35:35
- Label: Liberty
- Producer: Larry Butler

Kenny Rogers chronology
Love Is What We Make It (1985)	Short Stories (1985)	They Don't Make Them Like They Used To (1986)

Short Stories is a 1985 compilation album by Kenny Rogers, released by Liberty Records.

== Overview ==
Though the tracks on the album were remixed by producer Larry Butler, they had all been issued before by Rogers on his studio albums between 1976 and 1983. This album was not endorsed by Rogers as by the time it was released he had signed to RCA Nashville.

"Goodbye Marie" was released as a single in December 1985 and peaked at No. 47 on the U.S. Hot Country Songs chart in 1986.

=== Chronology ===
Short Stories rarely appears in discographies, but is labeled as 1986 where it does appear. The record itself indicates a copyright date of 1985 Liberty Records; the album can thus be placed after Love Is What We Make It for that reason, and before any 1986 album.

== Track listing ==
No.	Title	Writer(s)	Original album	Length
1.	"Desperado"	Glenn Frey, Don Henley	Daytime Friends	3:42
2.	"Goodbye Marie"	Mel McDaniel, Dennis Linde	Kenny	2:43
3.	"Abraham, Martin and John"	Dick Holler	Love Lifted Me	4:13
4.	"Buried Treasures"	Clyde Phillips, Ernie Powell	Love or Something Like It	3:17
5.	"San Francisco Mabel Joy"	Mickey Newbury	The Gambler	3:38
6.	"While the Feeling's Good"	Roger Bowling, Freddie Hart	Love Lifted Me	3:59
7.	"Long Arm of the Law"	Bowling, Billy Edd Wheeler	Greatest Hits	4:17
8.	"Daytime Friends"	Ben Peters	Daytime Friends	3:07
9.	"Green, Green Grass of Home"	Curly Putman	Kenny Rogers	3:31
10.	"The Son of Hickory Holler's Tramp"	Dallas Frazier	Kenny Rogers	3:08
