= List of Top Country LPs number ones of 1980 =

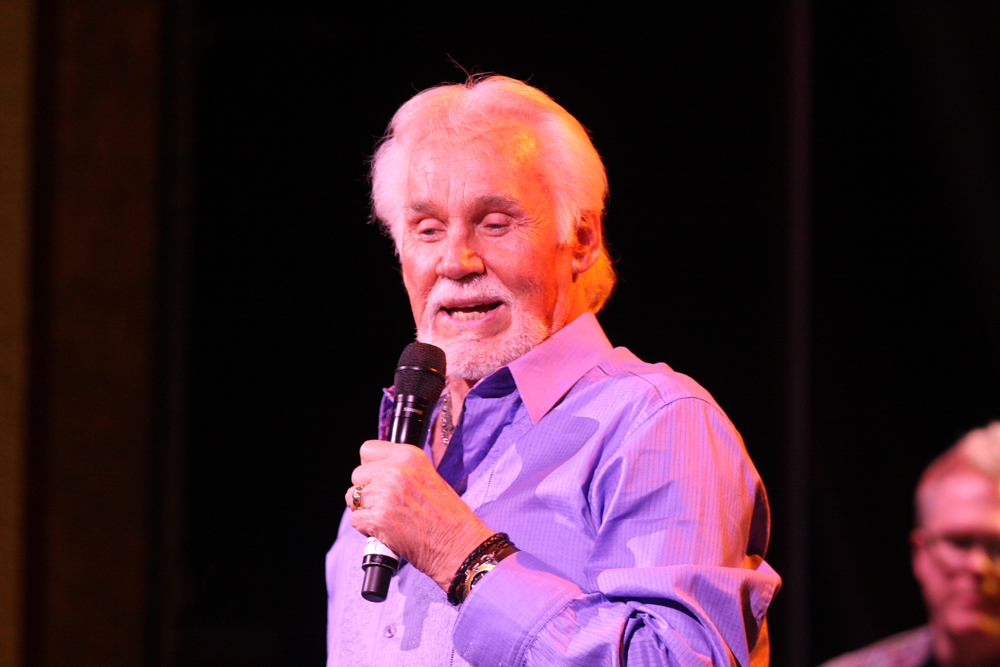
Kenny Rogers spent the most weeks at number one in 1980.

Top Country Albums is a chart that ranks the top-performing country music albums in the United States, published by Billboard. In 1980, ten different albums topped the chart, based on sales reports submitted by a representative sample of stores nationwide. The chart was published under the title Top Country LP's (with an apostrophe) through the issue of Billboard dated May 24, and Top Country LPs (without an apostrophe) thereafter.

In the issue of Billboard dated January 5, Kenny Rogers was at number one with his album Kenny, its ninth week in the top spot. The album remained atop the chart through the issue dated April 26 for a final total of 25 consecutive weeks at number one, the longest uninterrupted run atop the chart in its history. Two weeks after the album was displaced from the top spot, Rogers was back at number one with Gideon, a concept album featuring songs co-written by Kim Carnes which spent seven weeks atop the listing. Later in the year he returned once more to number one with Greatest Hits, which spent six weeks in the top spot before the year's end, meaning that he spent 30 weeks at number one during 1980. Rogers was at the peak of his career at the time, with the smooth production of his records appealing to both country and pop audiences. Between 1978 and 1980 he reached number one on the Hot Country Singles chart with five consecutive releases, including the title track from the album The Gambler.

The album that ended the record-breaking run at number one by Kenny was Charley Pride's There's a Little Bit of Hank in Me. The first African-American performer to achieve stardom in country music, Pride had been one of the genre's most successful singers of the 1970s and early 1980s, but his tribute to the songs of Hank Williams would be his last release to top the albums chart. Later in the year, both Eddie Rabbitt and Ronnie Milsap achieved their first chart-topping albums. Milsap had reached the top five with eight previous albums, three of which had been honoured with the Album of the Year award from the Country Music Association, but it was not until he released a compilation of his most successful songs that he reached number one for the first time. Two film soundtrack albums topped the chart in 1980, the first such releases to reach number one. In August, the soundtrack album of the film Urban Cowboy reached the top spot, where it would spend eight non-consecutive weeks. The film and its soundtrack are credited with dramatically increasing the mainstream popularity of country music, and the pop-influenced style which it featured would go on to dominate the country charts for most of the 1980s. It was followed into the top spot by Honeysuckle Rose, the soundtrack to the film of the same name, which consisted primarily of songs by Willie Nelson, the film's star.

== Chart history ==
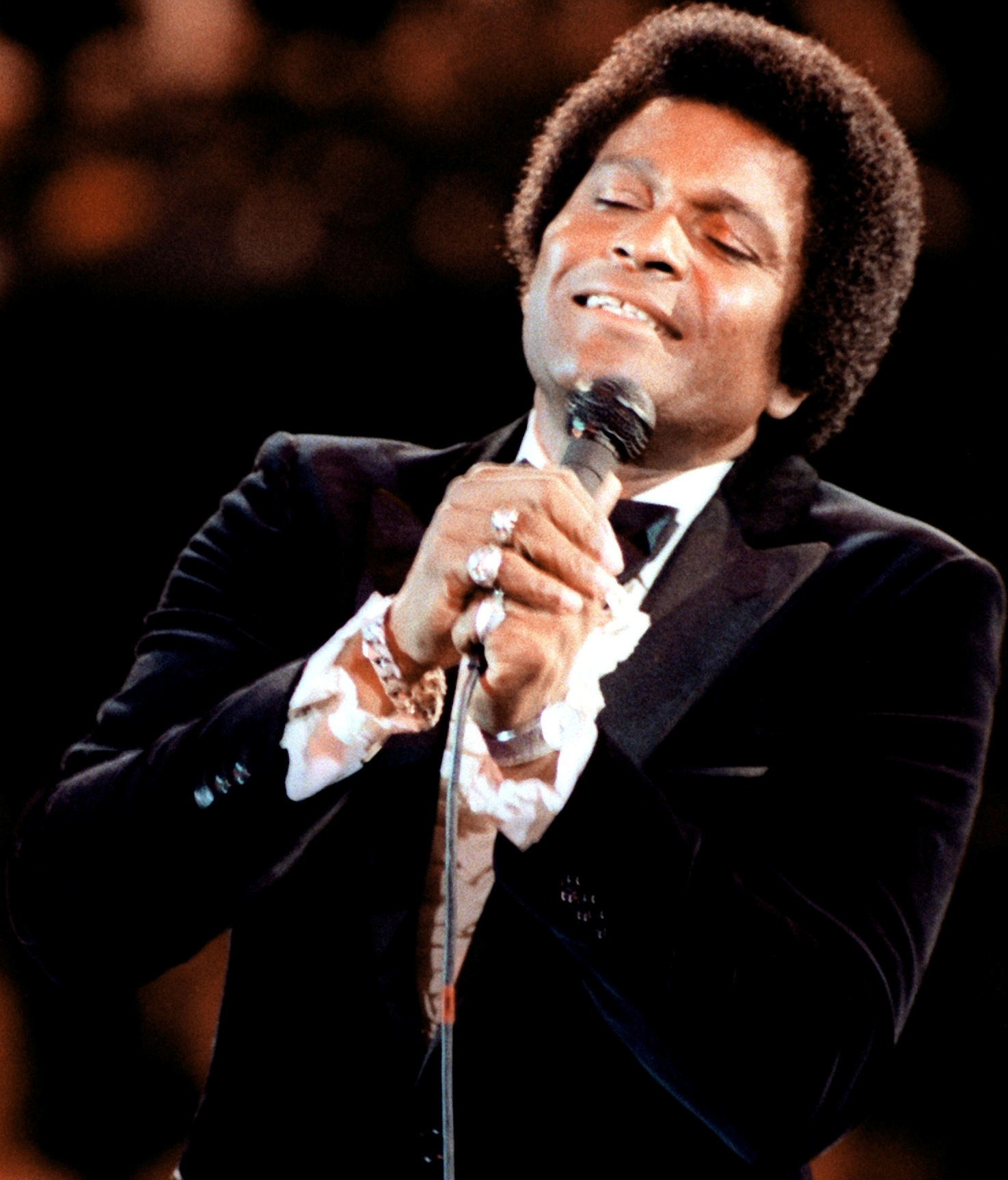
One of the biggest country stars of the 1970s, Charley Pride, had his final number-one album in 1980.

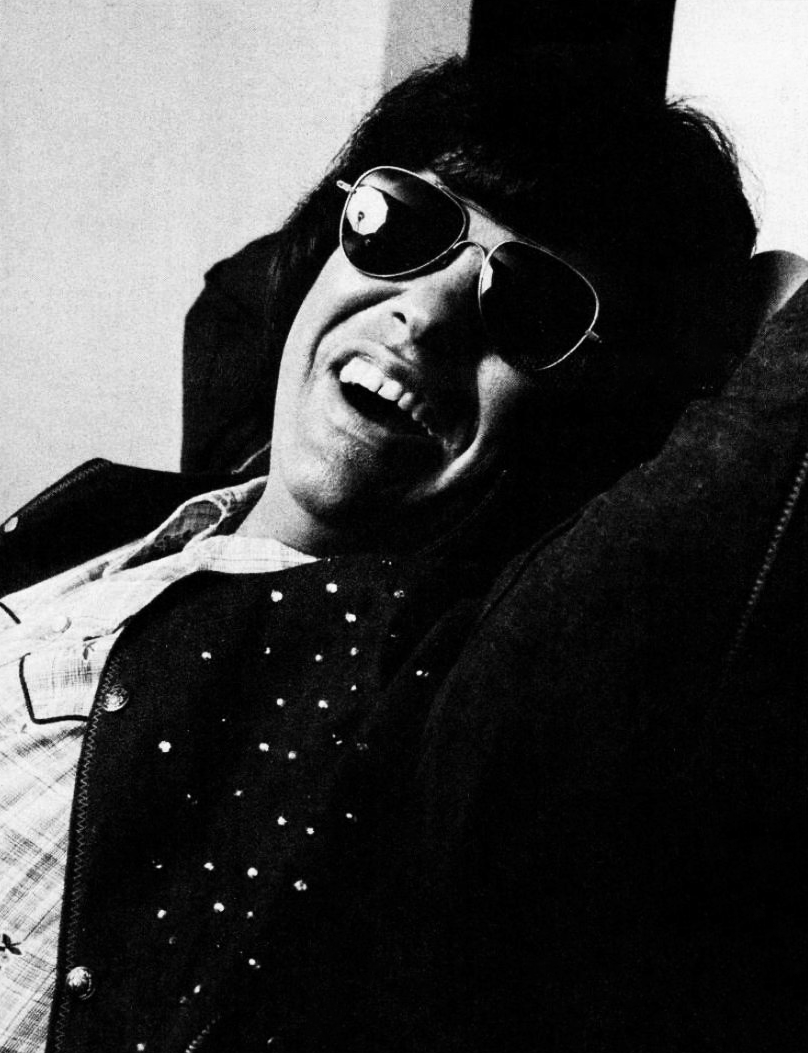
Ronnie Milsap topped the chart for the first time with his compilation album Greatest Hits.

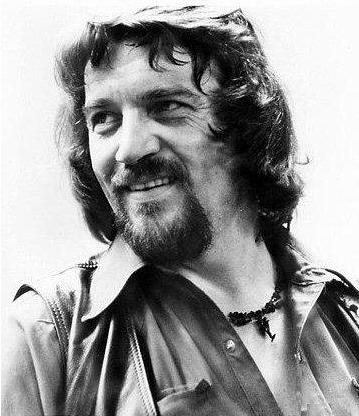
Waylon Jennings had two number ones in 1980.

Issue date	Title	Artist(s)	Ref.
January 5	Kenny	Kenny Rogers	
January 12	Kenny	Kenny Rogers	
January 19	Kenny	Kenny Rogers	
January 26	Kenny	Kenny Rogers	
February 2	Kenny	Kenny Rogers	
February 9	Kenny	Kenny Rogers	
February 16	Kenny	Kenny Rogers	
February 23	Kenny	Kenny Rogers	
March 1	Kenny	Kenny Rogers	
March 8	Kenny	Kenny Rogers	
March 15	Kenny	Kenny Rogers	
March 22	Kenny	Kenny Rogers	
March 29	Kenny	Kenny Rogers	
April 5	Kenny	Kenny Rogers	
April 12	Kenny	Kenny Rogers	
April 19	Kenny	Kenny Rogers	
April 26	Kenny	Kenny Rogers	
May 3	There's a Little Bit of Hank in Me	Charley Pride	
May 10	Gideon	Kenny Rogers	
May 17	There's a Little Bit of Hank in Me	Charley Pride	
May 24	Gideon	Kenny Rogers	
May 31	Greatest Hits	Waylon Jennings	
June 7	Gideon	Kenny Rogers	
June 14	Gideon	Kenny Rogers	
June 21	Gideon	Kenny Rogers	
June 28	Gideon	Kenny Rogers	
July 5	Gideon	Kenny Rogers	
July 12	Music Man	Waylon Jennings	
July 19	Music Man	Waylon Jennings	
July 26	Music Man	Waylon Jennings	
August 2	Urban Cowboy	Soundtrack	
August 9	Urban Cowboy	Soundtrack	
August 16	Urban Cowboy	Soundtrack	
August 23	Urban Cowboy	Soundtrack	
August 30	Urban Cowboy	Soundtrack	
September 6	Urban Cowboy	Soundtrack	
September 13	Horizon	Eddie Rabbitt	
September 20	Urban Cowboy	Soundtrack	
September 27	Urban Cowboy	Soundtrack	
October 4	Honeysuckle Rose	Soundtrack	
October 11	Honeysuckle Rose	Soundtrack	
October 18	Honeysuckle Rose	Soundtrack	
October 25	Honeysuckle Rose	Soundtrack	
November 1	Honeysuckle Rose	Soundtrack	
November 8	Honeysuckle Rose	Soundtrack	
November 15	Greatest Hits	Kenny Rogers	
November 22	Greatest Hits	Kenny Rogers	
November 29	Greatest Hits	Kenny Rogers	
December 6	Greatest Hits	Kenny Rogers	
December 13	Greatest Hits	Kenny Rogers	
December 20	Greatest Hits	Ronnie Milsap	
December 27	Greatest Hits	Kenny Rogers	
