= Ruby, Don't Take Your Love to Town (album) =

Studio album by The First Edition
- Released: 1969
- Recorded: Burbank, California
- Label: Reprise
- Producer: Glen D. Hardin, Jimmy Bowen, Mike Post

The First Edition chronology
The First Edition '69 (1969)	Ruby, Don't Take Your Love to Town (1969)	Something's Burning (1970)

Singles from Ruby, Don't Take Your Love to Town
- 1. "Once Again, She's All Alone" Released: April 1969; 2. "Ruby, Don't Take Your Love to Town" Released: May 1969; 3. "Reuben James" Released: September 1969

Ruby, Don't Take Your Love to Town is the fourth album by American band The First Edition. This was the first album to credit the group as Kenny Rogers & The First Edition. The title song reached number 6 on the Billboard Hot 100 chart in the United States. "Reuben James" became a top-30 hit in 1969 for The First Edition before being recorded by Conway Twitty for his 1970 Hello Darlin' album.

== Track listing ==
1. "Ruby, Don't Take Your Love to Town" (Mel Tillis)
2. "Me and Bobby McGee" (Kris Kristofferson)
3. "New Design" (P.F. Sloan)
4. "Always Leaving, Always Gone" (Dick Monda)
5. "Listen To The Music" (Barry Mann, Cynthia Weil)
6. "Sunshine" (Mickey Newbury)
7. "Once Again She's All Alone" (Mike Settle)
8. "Girl Get a Hold of Yourself" (Kenny Rogers)
9. "Good Time Liberator" (Kenny Rogers, Mike Settle)
10. "Reuben James" (Alex Harvey, Barry Etris)

== Personnel ==
- Kenny Rogers - Bass guitar, vocals
- Mike Settle - Rhythm guitar, vocals
- Thelma Camacho - background vocals
- Mary Arnold - backing vocals
- Terry Williams - lead guitar
- Mickey Jones - drums
