= The First Edition (album) =

Studio album by The First Edition
- Released: November 1967
- Length: 33:04
- Label: Reprise
- Producer: Mike Post

The First Edition chronology
The First Edition (1967)	The First Edition's Second (1968)

The First Edition is the debut studio album by the group the First Edition. Kenny Rogers sang the lead vocals on two tracks "Just Dropped In (To See What Condition My Condition Was In)" and "Dream On". "Just Dropped In (To See What Condition My Condition Was In)" became the only hit single from the album and marked the start of things to come, with Rogers soon becoming the lead singer of the group and the group being renamed "Kenny Rogers & the First Edition".

This album was re-issued as a 180 Gram Limited Edition by Golden Lane Records in 2010 (as #CLP-LP-1822). The cover art and back art is exactly the same as the original Reprise record. The inner sleeve has the original Alcoa Aluminum sweepstakes ad on one side and on the reverse is an updated biography of the First Edition written by Dave Thompson.

The producer of this album (and also the band's second and third albums), Mike Post gained later renown for the theme music for many TV dramas such as Hill Street Blues, Magnum, P.I., Law & Order and others.

== Track listing ==
All tracks composed by Mike Settle; except where indicated

1. "I Found a Reason" – 2:47
2. "Just Dropped In (To See What Condition My Condition Was In)" (Mickey Newbury) – 3:20
3. "Shadow in the Corner of Your Mind" – 2:52
4. "If Wishes Were Horses" – 2:32
5. "Ticket to Nowhere" – 2:24
6. "I Get a Funny Feeling" – 3:49
7. "I Was the Loser" – 3:05
8. "Dream On" (Mike Post, Walt Meskell) – 2:45
9. "Home Made Lies" (Mike Settle, Terry Williams) – 2:20
10. "Marcia: 2 A.M." – 2:20
11. "Hurry up, Love" (Mike Post, Walt Meskell) – 2:35
12. "Church Without a Name" – 3:15

== Personnel ==
First Edition

- Mike Settle - rhythm guitar, vocals
- Thelma Lou Camacho - vocals
- Kenny Rogers - bass, vocals
- Terry Williams - guitar, vocals
- Mickey Jones - drums

with:

- Al Capps (tracks 3–6, 9, 12), Mike Post (tracks 1–2, 7–8, 10–11) - arrangements

Technical

- Eddie Brackett, Michael Lietz - engineer
- Ed Thrasher - art direction
- Tony Esparza - photography
