= Something's Burning =

Studio album by Kenny Rogers & The First Edition
- Released: January, 1970
- Label: Reprise
- Producer: Kenny Rogers, Jimmy Bowen, Mike Post

Kenny Rogers & The First Edition chronology
Ruby, Don't Take Your Love to Town (1969)	Something's Burning (1970)	Tell It All Brother (1970)

Something's Burning is the fifth album by Kenny Rogers & The First Edition, released in 1970.

== Singles ==
Only one single was issued from the album, the title song "Something's Burning" with "Momma's Waiting" on the flip side. It was a worldwide Top 40 hit in 1970, including a #11 peak in the United States and #8 in the United Kingdom.

== Track listing ==
1. "Something's Burning" (Mac Davis)
2. "She Even Woke Me Up to Say Goodbye" (Mickey Newbury)
3. "Then I Miss You" (Bobby Bond)
4. "My Washington Woman" (A.L. Owens, Dallas Frazier)
5. "Just Remember You're My Sunshine" (Mike Settle)
6. "Sunshine Joe" (A.L. Owens, Dallas Frazier)
7. "A Stranger in My Place" (Kenny Rogers, Kin Vassy)
8. "It's a Crazy Afternoon" (Carole King, Toni Stern)
9. "Momma's Waiting" (Kenny Rogers, Terry Williams)
10. "Elvira" (Dallas Frazier)

== Personnel ==
- Kenny Rogers - bass guitar, vocals
- Mary Arnold - backing vocals
- Terry Williams - lead guitar
- Kin Vassy - guitar, vocals
- Mickey Jones - drums

== Covers ==
- In 1973 Candi Staton covered the song and had a minor R&B hit with it, peaking at #83.
- Recorded in 1973 and released in 1974, Blue Swede covered "Something's Burning" on their debut album, Hooked on a Feeling.
- In 1996, Dolly Parton a friend and occasional collaborator of both Davis and Rogers, covered "Something's Burning", including it on her album of covers, Treasures.

== Other songs ==
The album's closing track, "Elvira", was originally recorded by its composer, Dallas Frazier. It was later a hit single for the Oak Ridge Boys, who would later embark on several tours with Rogers after the First Edition disbanded in 1976.
