= Tell It All Brother =

Studio album by The First Edition
- Released: November 1970
- Label: Reprise
- Producer: Kenny Rogers, Jimmy Bowen

The First Edition chronology
Something's Burning (1970)	Tell It All Brother (1970)	Transition (1971)

Professional ratings
Review scores
Source	Rating
Allmusic	4/5 stars

Tell It All Brother is the sixth album by Kenny Rogers & The First Edition, released in 1970 by Reprise Records. It reached No.61 on the Billboard 200. Two singles were released and also charted, including the title track which reached No.17 on the Hot 100 on 29 August 1970 and #No.1 on WRKO on 13 August 1970. Larry Cansler arranged the string sections.

== Track listing ==
1. "Tell It All Brother" (Alex Harvey)
2. "Shine On Ruby Mountain" (Kenny Young)
3. "The King of Oak Street" (Alex Harvey)
4. "I'm Gonna Sing You a Sad Song Susie" (Mike Settle)
5. "Love Woman" (Douglas Legrand, Kenny Rogers)
6. "Heed the Call" (Kin Vassy)
7. "Camptown Ladies" (Traditional; adapted and arranged by Kenny Rogers)
8. "Molly" (Alex Harvey)
9. "After All (I Live My Life)" (Frankie Miller, Jim Doris)
10. "We All Got to Help Each Other" (Earl Cate, Ernest Cate)

== Singles ==
- "Tell It All Brother" (1970), #17 on the Hot 100
- "Heed The Call" (1970), #33 on the Hot 100
