= Dann Rogers =

American singer and songwriter

- Occupation: Musician
- Website: dannrogers.com

Dann Rogers is an American musician.

== Early life ==
Dann Rogers grew up in the music industry. His father Lelan was a legend as a music promoter, producer, and record company owner. At 11 years old Rogers knew he wanted to be a songwriter when he watched the legendary ‘Mickey Newberry’ write “I Just Dropped In (To See What Condition My Condition Is In).” At 15 Dann wrote his first pop hit for Johnny Nash called “My Merry Go Round’. He spent two years along with Johnny Nash and reggae king Bob Marley as a staff writer for Caymen Music in the early 70’s.

== Recording career ==
Rogers had two big pop hits as an artist in the late 70’s and early 80’s. In 1985, Dann was signed to MCA Records Nashville division. His first album for MCA “Still Runnin” was critically acclaimed and voted one of the Top 50 albums to come out of Nashville in 1987.

Dann and his uncle, Kenny Rogers, are the first two relatives to hit the Top 10 on Billboard’s Adult Contemporary singles chart at the same time – Kenny with “Coward of the County” (#5) and Dann, from his album Hearts Under Fire, with “Looks like Love Again” (#6).
