= I'm Not Making Music for Money =

Studio album by The First Edition
- Released: 1974
- Recorded: 1973–1974

The First Edition chronology
Monumental (1973)	I'm Not Making Music for Money (1974)	Greatest Hits (1976)

I'm Not Making Music for Money is the twelfth and final studio album by the American band The First Edition. The album was released in 1974 and issued only in New Zealand.

== Track listing ==
No.	Title	Writer(s)	Length
1.	"Dirty Work"	Donald Fagen, Walter Becker
2.	"Lena Lookie"	Kenny Rogers
3.	"She Even Woke Me Up to Say Goodbye" (re-recording)	Mickey Newbury
4.	"Daddy Was a Traveling Man"	Bobby Hart, Danny Janssen
5.	"Something about Your Song"	Jimmy Hassell
6.	"Love Woman" (jam re-recording)	Douglas Legrand, Kenny Rogers
7.	"Stranger in My Place" (re-recording)	Kenny Rogers
8.	"Sunshine" (re-recording)	Mickey Newbury
9.	"Makin' Music for Money"	Alex Harvey
10.	"Forgive Me Now"	Matthew Moore

== Personnel ==
- Kenny Rogers – vocals, bass
- Mary Arnold – vocals, tambourine
- Jimmy Hassell – guitar, vocals
- Terry Williams – guitar, vocals
- Mickey Jones – drums, percussion
- Gene Lorenzo – Keyboards
