= Lady (Kenny Rogers song) =

Single by Kenny Rogers

from the album Greatest Hits
- B-side: "Sweet Music Man"
- Released: September 29, 1980 (U.S.)
- Recorded: 1980
- Studio: Concorde Recording, Los Angeles
- Genre: Country; R&B; soul
- Length: 3:54
- Label: Liberty 1380
- Songwriter: Lionel Richie
- Producer: Lionel Richie

Kenny Rogers singles chronology
"Don't Fall in Love with a Dreamer" (1980)	"Lady" (1980)	"What Are We Doin' in Love" (1981)

Audio
- "Kenny Rogers - Lady" on YouTube

"Lady" is a song written by Lionel Richie and first recorded by American country music artist Kenny Rogers. It was released in September 1980 on the album Kenny Rogers' Greatest Hits.

It is listed at number 60 on Billboard's "Hot 100 All-Time Top Songs".

== Song history ==
The song was written and produced by Lionel Richie, recorded in 1980, and ranks among Kenny Rogers's biggest hits. Rogers once told an interviewer,

The idea was that Lionel would come from R&B and I'd come from country, and we'd meet somewhere in pop.

The success of "Lady" also boosted Richie's career. The production work on the song was his first outside the Commodores and foreshadowed his success as a solo act during the 1980s. Rogers was also a featured vocalist on "We Are the World", co-written by Richie. Richie performed "Lady" himself on his 1998 album, Time, and he and Rogers performed the song as a duet on Richie's 2012 release Tuskegee. Richie had originally pitched this song to the Commodores and they turned it down. Then later, it was given to Rogers to record, and it became the biggest selling hit single for him as a solo artist.

When asked about his personal favorite song during an October 1986 appearance on The Phil Donahue Show, Rogers responded that "'Lady' is head and shoulders above almost all the songs in the world".

Since his breakup with the First Edition, Rogers had tasted considerable success as a solo act, with nine number one entries on the Billboard magazine Hot Country Singles chart (prior to the release of "Lady"), plus several top 10 hits on the Billboard Hot 100 and Hot Adult Contemporary Tracks charts.

"Lady", according to music historian Fred Bronson, would prove to be an important record for both Richie and Rogers. It became the first record of the 1980s to chart on all four of Billboard's singles charts – country, Hot 100, adult contemporary and Hot Soul Singles.

It reached number one on three of those charts in late 1980. On the Hot 100, "Lady" reached the summit on 15 November and stayed at the top for a massive six-week stint (tying with Blondie's "Call Me" for the longest run of the year). On 27 December, it would be knocked out of the top spot by "(Just Like) Starting Over" by John Lennon. On the Hot Country Singles chart, it would spend a week at the summit. "Lady" also peaked at number 42 on the Hot Soul Singles chart.

As a country entry, "Lady" was Rogers' 10th chart-topping hit in a career that saw him collect 20 number one songs between 1977 and 2000. On the Hot 100, it was his only solo chart-topping song, although Rogers would have a duet number one three years later (1983's "Islands in the Stream" with Dolly Parton). On the Hot Adult Contemporary Tracks chart, "Lady" was Rogers' second (of eight) songs that reached the chart's summit. Billboard ranked it at the number three song for 1981.

== Charts ==
=== Weekly charts ===
Chart (1980–1981)	Peak position
Argentina	3
Australia (Kent Music Report)	16
Belgium (Ultratop 50 Flanders)	21
Canadian CRIA Top Singles	2
Canada Top Singles (RPM)	2
Canada Adult Contemporary (RPM)	6
Canada Country Singles (RPM)	2
France (SNEP)	11
Ireland (IRMA)	12
Netherlands (Dutch Top 40)	16
New Zealand (Recorded Music NZ)	6
South Africa (Springbok)	3
Spain (AFYVE)	19
UK Singles (Official Charts Company)	12
US Hot Country Songs (Billboard)	1
US Billboard Hot 100	1
US Adult Contemporary (Billboard)	1
US R&B (Billboard)	42

=== Year-end charts ===
Chart (1980)	Rank
US Cash Box Top 100	6

Chart (1981)	Rank
Australia (Kent Music Report)	93
Canada RPM Top Singles	43
South Africa	17
US Billboard Hot 100	3

=== End-of-decade charts ===
End of decade (1980–89)	Position
US Billboard Hot 100	10

=== All-time charts ===
Chart (1958–2018)	Position
US Billboard Hot 100	60

== Certifications ==
Region	Certification	Certified units/sales
New Zealand (RMNZ)	Gold	15,000^{‡}
United States (RIAA)	Gold	1,000,000^{^}
^{^} Shipments figures based on certification alone.

== See also ==
- List of Billboard Hot 100 number ones of 1980

== Bibliography ==
- Whitburn, Joel, "Top Country Songs: 1944-2005," 2006.
- Whitburn, Joel, "Top Pop Singles: 1955-2006," 2007.
