= Kenny (album) =

Studio album by Kenny Rogers
- Released: September 1979
- Recorded: 1979
- Studios: American Sound (Memphis, Tennessee); Jack Clement Recording (Nashville, Tennessee)
- Genre: Country
- Length: 36:02
- Label: United Artists Group
- Producer: Larry Butler

Kenny Rogers chronology
The Kenny Rogers Singles Album (1979)	Kenny (1979)	Gideon (1980)

Singles from Kenny
- 1. "You Decorated My Life" Released: September 10, 1979; 2. "Coward of the County" Released: November 12, 1979

Professional ratings
Review scores
Source	Rating
AllMusic	4/5 stars

Kenny is the eighth studio album by American singer Kenny Rogers, released in 1979. It includes the singles "Coward of the County" and "You Decorated My Life."

"Tulsa Turnaround" is a reworking of an earlier song Rogers recorded with The First Edition.

"Goodbye Marie" was first recorded by Johnny Rodriguez on his March 1979 album, Rodriguez Was Here, and then later recorded by Bobby Goldsboro, charting as a single for him in 1981.

The album reached the top five of the US Billboard album chart and #1 in the Country charts (where it stayed for a record total of 25 weeks). In the UK, it was a top ten album as well. In 2007, the album was issued as a two-album set on one CD, the other album included on the disc being the self-titled Kenny Rogers from 1976.

In the sleeve notes for the 2009 reissue on the Edsel record label, biographer Chris Bolton notes that this album "does its best to represent every musical personality of Kenny Rogers." Stephen Thomas Erlewine states that the album mixes music styles from Country to Disco.

This was the fourth of twelve #1's for Rogers on the Country albums chart, as well as his first Top 10 'Pop' album entry.

== Track listing ==
No.	Title	Writer(s)	Length
1.	"You Turn the Light On"	Lewis Anderson, Stephen Geyer	3:03
2.	"You Decorated My Life"	Debbie Hupp, Bob Morrison	3:38
3.	"She's a Mystery"	Larry Keith, Steve Pippin	2:54
4.	"Goodbye Marie"	Dennis Linde, Mel McDaniel	2:47
5.	"Tulsa Turnaround"	Larry Collins, Paul Cotton, Alex Harvey	2:52
6.	"I Want to Make You Smile"	Bill Medley	3:20
7.	"Santiago Midnight Moonlight"	John Porter McMeans	3:14
8.	"One Man's Woman"	Steve Glassmeyer	3:45
9.	"In and Out of Your Heart"	Thomas Cain, Randy Cullers, Dennis Linde, Alan Rush	3:23
10.	"Old Folks"	Willard Robison	2:44
11.	"Coward of the County"	Roger Bowling, Billy Edd Wheeler	4:20

== Personnel ==
- Kenny Rogers – lead vocals
- Bobby Wood, Chuck Cochran, David Briggs, Edgar Struble, Gene Golden, Hargus "Pig" Robbins, Larry Keith, Shane Keister – piano
- Edgar Struble – clavinet, synthesizers
- Billy Sanford, Dave Kirby, Jerry Shook, Jimmy Capps, Johnny Christopher, Larry Keith, Randy Dorman, Ray Edenton, Reggie Young, Tommy Allsup, Rick Harper, Steve Glassmeyer – guitars
- Bobby Thompson – banjo
- Charles "Chuck" Jacob, Joe Osborn – bass guitar
- Bob Moore – upright bass
- Bobby Daniels – drums
- Farrell Morris – percussion
- Steve Glassmeyer – saxophone
- Sheldon Kurland Strings – strings
- Bill Justis, Edgar Struble (track 10) – string arrangements
- Bergen White, Bobby Daniels, Buzz Cason, Don Gant, Donna McElroy, Edgar Struble, Lea Jane Berinati, Steve Glassmeyer, Todd Cerney, Tom Brannon, Yvonne Hodges – backing vocals

== Production ==
- Producer, Mixing – Larry Butler
- Engineers – Billy Sherrill (Tracks 1, 2, 4–8, 10 & 11); Harold Lee (Tracks 3 & 9).
- Recorded at American Studios and Jack Clements Recording Studios (Nashville, TN).
- Mastered by Bob Sowell at Master Control (Nashville, TN).
- Artwork – Bill Burks
- Photography – Reid Miles

== Charts ==
=== Weekly charts ===
Chart (1979–80)	Peak position
Australian Albums (Kent Music Report)	15
Austrian Albums (Ö3 Austria)	17
Canada Top Albums/CDs (RPM)	1
Canada Country Albums/CDs (RPM)	1
Dutch Albums (Album Top 100)	17
New Zealand Albums (RMNZ)	15
UK Albums (Official Charts)	7
US Billboard 200	5
US Top Country Albums (Billboard)	1

=== Year-end charts ===
Chart (1979)	Position
Canada Top Albums/CDs (RPM)	52
Chart (1980)	Position
Canada Top Albums/CDs (RPM)	9
US Billboard 200	10

== Certifications ==
Region	Certification	Certified units/sales
Australia (ARIA)	Platinum	50,000^{^}
Canada (Music Canada)	4× Platinum	400,000^{^}
United Kingdom (BPI)	Gold	100,000^{^}
United States (RIAA)	3× Platinum	3,000,000^{^}
^{^} Shipments figures based on certification alone.
