= Goodbye Marie =

Single by Bobby Goldsboro

from the album Bobby Goldsboro
- B-side: "Love Has Made a Woman out of You"
- Released: 1980
- Genre: Country
- Label: Curb
- Songwriters: Mel McDaniel; Dennis Linde

Bobby Goldsboro singles chronology
"Black Fool's Gold" (1979)	"Goodbye Marie" (1980)	"Alice Doesn't Love Here Anymore" (1981)

"Goodbye Marie" is a country-pop song written by Mel McDaniel and Dennis Linde. The song is about a man who has to leave his lover to head for "the lonesome highway" back to his home in Houston, Texas. It was first released by Johnny Rodriguez on his March 1979 album, Rodriguez Was Here.

In September 1979, Kenny Rogers released the song on his album, Kenny. Although the song was not issued as a single at the time, after Kenny Rogers signed to RCA Records his former label, Liberty Records, issued a newly overdubbed version on a Rogers compilation album called Short Stories and as a single in December 1985 that went to #47 in 1986.

Bobby Goldsboro took a version of the song to #17 on the Billboard Country chart in December 1980.

Mel McDaniel also released the song on his 1981 album, I'm Countryfied, and as the B-side of his single "I Call It Love." Bluegrass group Merle Monroe covered the song for a hit in 2021 with Tim Raybon as lead singer (the group later renamed itself Tim Raybon Band).

== Chart performance ==
=== Bobby Goldsboro ===
Chart (1980)	Peak position
U.S. Billboard Hot Country Singles	17

=== Kenny Rogers ===
Chart (1986)	Peak position
U.S. Billboard Hot Country Singles	47
