= Something's Burning (song) =

1970 single by Kenny Rogers and the First Edition

Single by Kenny Rogers and the First Edition

from the album Something's Burning
- B-side: "Momma's Waiting"
- Released: January 1970
- Genre: Country rock
- Length: 4:00
- Label: Reprise
- Songwriter: Mac Davis
- Producer: Jimmy Bowen

Kenny Rogers and the First Edition singles chronology
"Reuben James" (1969)	"Something's Burning" (1970)	"Tell It All Brother" (1970)

"Something's Burning" is a song by American rock band Kenny Rogers and the First Edition, released in January 1970 as a single from their album of the same name.

== Controversy ==
The song was controversial, described at the time as being "too sensual" for the radio. It started with an actual heartbeat played backwards. Rogers knew it was a hit record, but American radio wouldn't play it, so he got the band to perform the song on This Is Tom Jones in the UK, who he believed were "much less afraid of sexuality" than America and so "would at least give the song a fair hearing". This Is Tom Jones was also broadcast in the US and eventually it gave enough exposure to the song to make it a hit.

== Reception ==
Reviewed in Billboard, it was written that the song "could easily repeat that success [of "Reuben James"] with this driving rocker, with an exceptional vocal workout by Rogers". Cash Box wrote that the "grand vocal work and an instrumental that builds behind the scene give this new track a bright prospect for teen and adult programming".

However, reviewing for Record Mirror, James Hamilton wrote that "this soft-then-building, soft-again-then-building slowie certainly won't get the crowd dancing (nor the critics disapproving) ... it's not that it's bad, just ordinary".

== Track listing ==
1. "Something's Burning" (Davis; produced by Jimmy Bowen) – 4:00
2. "Momma's Waiting" (Rogers, Williams; produced by Mike Post) – 3:25

== Charts ==
Chart (1970)	Peak position
Australia (Kent Music Report)	13
Canada Top Singles (RPM)	6
Malaysia (Radio Malaysia)	1
New Zealand (Listener)	14
UK Singles (Official Charts)	8
US Billboard Hot 100	11
US Cash Box Top 100	5
