= Thelma Camacho =

American opera singer

- Born: Thelma Camacho
- Genres: Opera; pop; adult contemporary
- Occupation: Singer
- Instrument: Vocals
- Years active: 1967–1991
- Formerly of: The Young Americans; The New Christy Minstrels; Kenny Rogers and The First Edition

Thelma Camacho Ivie is an American opera and rock and roll singer known for her membership in the groups the New Christy Minstrels and the First Edition.

As a teenager in San Diego, California, Camacho was Miss Teen San Diego and sang in Starlight Theater productions. She sang lead with the San Diego Civic Light Opera by the age of 14. She turned down a scholarship to study opera in Milan, joining The Young Americans and then the New Christy Minstrels. At age 18, in 1967 Camacho and Kenny Rogers formed the First Edition with Mike Settle, Mickey Jones, and Terry Williams. Camacho sang lead on songs such as "I Get a Funny Feeling", notably on The Smothers Brothers Show and The Ed Sullivan Show in 1968. She appeared on the first three albums by the group, writing six of their songs.

She was dismissed from the First Edition for disputed reasons. In his book With Luck or Something Like It, Rogers wrote that Camacho was "let go because she had fallen in love, was tired of touring and perhaps didn't agree with certain decisions." She then retired from the music business.

After Camacho left the First Edition, her spot was taken by her roommate, Mary Arnold, after singer Karen Carpenter auditioned for the role.

After marrying producer Robert Ivie, she moved to Europe in the 1980s and designed costumes for Bavaria Film Studios in Munich and Haute Couture Ateliers in Cologne. She owned a jewelry shop in San Diego's Spanish Village. She is now retired.
