= But You Know I Love You =

1968 song by Kenny Rogers and The First Edition

Single by Kenny Rogers and The First Edition

from the album The First Edition '69
- B-side: "Homemade Lies"
- Released: 1968
- Recorded: 1968
- Genre: Country
- Length: 3:01
- Label: Reprise
- Songwriter: Mike Settle
- Producer: Jimmy Bowen

Kenny Rogers and The First Edition singles chronology
"Just Dropped In (To See What Condition My Condition Was In)" (1968)	"But You Know I Love You" (1968)	"Ruby, Don't Take Your Love To Town" (1969)

"But You Know I Love You" is a song written by Mike Settle, which was a 1969 pop hit for Kenny Rogers and The First Edition, a group that included Settle and Kenny Rogers. The song also became a major country hit by Bill Anderson in 1969. In 1981, a cover version of "But You Know I Love You" by singer Dolly Parton topped the country singles charts.

== Kenny Rogers and The First Edition version ==
=== Background ===
In the song, "But You Know I Love You", the narrator voices regret over not being able to remain with his/her significant other, due to career demands and the need to travel for his/her job. At the time, Mike Settle was guitarist for Kenny Rogers and The First Edition, with Kenny Rogers singing lead and Settle harmonizing. The fall 1968 release, with a brass-tinged country-folk sound to broaden the group's fan base, peaked at number 19 on the Billboard Hot 100 just under a year after "Just Dropped In (To See What Condition My Condition Was In)" peaked. During the group's rendition on The Smothers Brothers Comedy Hour that aired on 8 December 1968, the audience was unwittingly fooled to start clapping too soon, right after the false ending but way before the real ending.

=== Charts ===
Chart (1969)	Peak position
US Billboard Hot 100	19
US Adult Contemporary (Billboard)	18
Canadian RPM Top Singles	11
Canadian RPM Adult Contemporary	9

== Bill Anderson version ==
Bill Anderson's cover version of "But You Know I Love You" from his album My Life/But You Know I Love You (Decca DL 75142) rose to No. 2 on the Billboard Hot Country Singles chart in 1969.

=== Charts ===
Chart (1969)	Peak position
US Hot Country Songs (Billboard)	2
Canadian RPM Country Tracks	6

== Dolly Parton version ==
"But You Know I Love You"

Single by Dolly Parton

from the album 9 to 5 and Odd Jobs
- B-side: "Poor Folks' Town"
- Released: March 16, 1981
- Recorded: 1980
- Genre: Country pop
- Length: 3:20
- Label: RCA
- Songwriter: Mike Settle
- Producer: Mike Post

Dolly Parton singles chronology
"9 to 5" (1981)	"But You Know I Love You" (1981)	"The House of the Rising Sun" (1981)

=== Background ===
Country entertainer Dolly Parton (who, in 1983, would have the number 1 duet "Islands In The Stream" with Kenny Rogers) in 1980 included "But You Know I Love You", based on the occupation of on-the-road singer, on her album 9 to 5 and Odd Jobs. In March 1981, Parton released the song as the album's second single, following the success of "9 to 5," and it reached No. 1 on the Hot Country Singles chart on 20 June 1981, succeeding Rogers's accompanying Dottie West on "What Are We Doin' in Love" at the top slot. Parton's version also crossed over, bowing at number 82 on 4 April 1981 and peaking at number 41 on 16 May 1981 on the Hot 100 and No. 14 on the AC chart.

=== Charts ===
==== Weekly ====
Chart (1981)	Peak position
US Hot Country Songs (Billboard)	1
US Billboard Hot 100	41
US Adult Contemporary (Billboard)	14
Canadian RPM Country Tracks	2

==== Year-end ====
Chart (1981)	Peak Position
US Hot Country Songs (Billboard)	6

== Other covers ==
- 1969: Ray Stevens for his album Have a Little Talk with Myself (Monument SLP 18134).
- 1969: Wynn Stewart for his album Yours Forever (Capitol ST 324).
- 1969: Teresa Bennett for her album Anita Kerr Presents Teresa (Dot DLP 25944).
- 1969: The Sweet Inspirations for their album Sweets for My Sweet (Atlantic SD 8225).
- 1969: Kim Weston and Johnny Nash for their album Johnny Nash & Kim Weston (Major Minor SMLP 54).
- 1969: Buck Owens for his album Tall Dark Stranger (Capitol ST 212).
- 1970: Barbara Lewis for her album The Many Grooves of Barbara Lewis (Enterprise ENS 1006).
- 1970: Evie Sands for her album Any Way That You Want Me (A&M SP 4239) (US Billboard #110, AC #30).
- 1970: Julie Rogers for her album Once More With Feeling (Ember NR 5050).
- 1970: Skeeter Davis for her album A Place In the Country (RCA Victor LSP-4310).
- 1972: Laura Lee for her album Love More Than Pride (Chess CH 50031).
- 1972: Maria Dallas for her album Town and Country (CBS SBP-234201).
- 1973: Henson Cargill for his album This Is Henson Cargill Country (Atlantic SD 7279).
