= Daytime Friends =

Studio album by Kenny Rogers
- Released: July 25, 1977
- Recorded: 1977
- Studios: American (Memphis, Tennessee); Jack Clement (Nashville, Tennessee)
- Genre: Country
- Length: 36:33
- Label: United Artists
- Producer: Larry Butler

Kenny Rogers chronology
Kenny Rogers (1977)	Daytime Friends (1977)	Ten Years of Gold (1978)

Singles from Kenny Rogers
- 1. "Daytime Friends" Released: August 1, 1977; 2. "Sweet Music Man" Released: October 10, 1977

Professional ratings
Review scores
Source	Rating
AllMusic	2.5/5 stars
The Rolling Stone Album Guide	1/5 stars

Daytime Friends is the third studio album by American singer Kenny Rogers for United Artists Records, released in 1977. It was his second major success following the break-up of The First Edition in 1976 (his first album Love Lifted Me was a minor success, with his second, the self-titled Kenny Rogers, going to Number 1 on the US country charts and crossing over to the mainstream pop charts in many countries).

The album produced two top 10 singles with the title cut reaching No. 1 on the country singles and tracks chart (and the top 40 in the UK singles chart) and "Sweet Music Man" (Rogers' own composition) reaching No. 9. Elsewhere on the album is a song called "Am I Too Late" which was not released as a single, despite Rogers later saying it was one of his favorite songs . Another track "My World Begins and Ends with You" was later recorded by Dave & Sugar, who had a hit single with it in 1979.

The album reached No. 2 on the Country charts.

== Track listing ==
No.	Title	Writer(s)	Length
1.	"Daytime Friends"	Ben Peters	3:14
2.	"Desperado"	Don Henley, Glenn Frey	3:44
3.	"Rock and Roll Man"	Kenny O'Dell	2:46
4.	"Lying Again"	Chips Moman, Larry Butler	2:41
5.	"I'll Just Write My Music and Sing My Songs"	Thomas Cain	2:55
6.	"My World Begins and Ends with You"	Larry Keith, Steve Pippin	2:43
7.	"Sweet Music Man"	Rogers	4:16
8.	"Am I Too Late"	Keith, Jim Hurt	3:31
9.	"We Don't Make Love Anymore"	Rogers, Marianne Gordon	3:51
10.	"Ghost of Another Man"	Frank Dycus, George Richey, Roger Bowling	2:57
11.	"Let Me Sing for You"	Casey Kelly, Julie Didier	4:39

== Personnel ==
- Kenny Rogers – lead vocals
- Bobby Wood, Charles Cochran, Edgar Struble, Gene Golden (on tracks 2 and 5), Hargus "Pig" Robbins, Steve Glassmeyer – keyboards
- Shane Keister – Moog synthesizer (on track 7)
- Billy Sanford, David Kirby, Jerry Shook (on track 9), Jimmy Capps, Jimmy Colvard (on track 1), Johnny Christopher (on track 2), Larry Keith, Reggie Young (on track 1), T.G. Engel – guitars
- Pete Drake – steel guitar
- Joe Osborn, Mike Leech (on track 1) – bass guitar
- Tommy Allsup – six-string bass guitar
- Bob Moore – upright bass (on track 9)
- Bobby Daniels (on track 2), Jerry Carrigan, Kenny Malone – drums
- Brenton Banks, Byron Bach, Carl Gorodetzky, Gary Vanosdale, George Binkley, Lennie Haight, Marvin Chantry, Pam Sixfin, Roy Christensen, Sheldon Kurland, Stephanie Woolf, Steven Smith, Willi Lehmann – strings
- Bill Justis – string arrangements (on tracks 2, 7, 9)
- Bergen White, Bobby Daniels, Buzz Cason, Don Gant, Gene Golden, Johnny MacRae, The Jordanaires (on track 4), Larry Keith, Randy Rogers, Sandy Rogers, Steve Glassmeyer, Steve Pippin – backing vocals

Production

- Producer – Larry Butler
- Engineers – Harold Lee and Billy Sherrill
- Remix – Billy Sherrill
- Recorded at American Studios and Jack Clement Recording Studios (Nashville, TN).
- Mastered by Bob Sowell at Master Control (Nashville, TN).
- Art Direction – Ria Lewerke
- Design – Bill Burks
- Photography – Gary Regester

== Charts ==
=== Weekly charts ===
Chart (1977–1978)	Peak position
Canada Top Albums/CDs (RPM)	41
US Billboard 200	39
US Top Country Albums (Billboard)	2

=== Year-end charts ===
Chart (1977)	Position
US Top Country Albums (Billboard)	22

Chart (1978)	Position
US Top Country Albums (Billboard)	16

== Certifications ==
Region	Certification	Certified units/sales
Canada (Music Canada)	Gold	50,000^{^}
United States (RIAA)	Platinum	1,000,000^{^}
^{^} Shipments figures based on certification alone.
