= Rollin' on the River (TV series) =

Musical variety program

- Presented by: Kenny Rogers and The First Edition

Production
- Executive producer: Ken Kragen

Original release
- Release: September 1971 – 1973

Rollin' on the River (later shortened to Rollin') is a musical variety television program hosted by Kenny Rogers and the First Edition. They were the first pop rock group to host their own prime-time TV series. The program was produced by Winters/Rosen Productions and Glen-Warren Productions in association with CTV Television Network in Canada. The show aired in syndication from 1971 to 1973. It was carried by 163 U.S. TV stations and 12 stations in Canada.

Rollin' on the River debuted in September 1971 as a 1-hour series at 7:00pm on Saturday nights. For the 1972 season, the show was abbreviated to Rollin', and the show's length was cut down to 30 minutes on Mondays at 7:30pm. It was produced at the CFTO studios in Toronto.

Ken Kragen, the personal manager for the First Edition, was the executive producer. Production began in May 1971 on a studio-built riverboat. Al Hirt was meant to be the co-host, but scheduling conflicts prevented him from spending more than one day shooting the pilot. The First Edition hosted most of the pilot which aired as Al Hirt Meets The First Edition.

The guests on the show included the Carpenters, Ike & Tina Turner, The Grass Roots, the Beach Boys, Delaney & Bonnie, B.B. King, Kris Kristofferson, Gladys Knight & the Pips, and Jose Feliciano.
