= Terry Williams (musician) =

American singer-songwriter (born 1947)

- Born: Terry Williams; June 6, 1947 (age 79); Hollywood, California, U.S.
- Genres: pop; adult contemporary
- Occupation: Singer
- Instrument: Guitar
- Years active: 1967–present
- Formerly of: The New Christy Minstrels; Kenny Rogers and The First Edition

Terry Williams (born June 6, 1947) is an American singer-songwriter and guitarist. He formed the band The First Edition with musicians Kenny Rogers, Mike Settle, and Thelma Camacho. He is the only member of the group other than Rogers to play on every album by the band.

Williams grew up in Hollywood, California. His father played trombone for the Tommy Dorsey Orchestra and his mother, Bonnie Lou Williams, was a vocalist in Dorsey's band. While working for the promotion department at Warner Bros. Records, he found he could not play guitar at work, so he joined the New Christy Minstrels. There he met the other members of what would become The First Edition.

Williams taught Rogers to play electric bass, as Rogers had only played upright bass before. He co-wrote songs with Rogers such as "Momma's Waiting," and produced many of their songs.

Later the group released its concept album The Ballad of Calico, and embarked on a tour of New Zealand. Williams was the last original member to leave the band, leading to its breakup. After the breakup of the band, Williams continued the act as "Terry Williams and The First Edition." He continued to work with Rogers managing his recording studio.
