= Mary Arnold (singer) =

American singer (born 1947)

- Born: Mary Margaret Arnold; September 19, 1947 (age 78); Carroll, Iowa, U.S.
- Genres: pop; country
- Occupation: Singer
- Instrument: Vocals
- Years active: 1968–1992
- Formerly of: The Young Americans; Kenny Rogers and The First Edition

Mary Margaret Arnold (born September 19, 1947) is an American singer. She performed with the rock group Kenny Rogers and The First Edition from 1968 to 1976.

== Early life and education ==
Arnold was born in Carroll, Iowa, and attended Drake University in Des Moines. While at Drake University, Arnold had her own TV show. While studying at the Los Angeles Conservatory of Music, Arnold auditioned for the show choir The Young Americans. She took a year off of school and toured with the group, meeting fellow singer Kenny Rogers. Her roommate was singer Thelma Camacho, who sang with Rogers in the band The First Edition.

== Career ==
When Camacho was dismissed from Kenny Rogers and The First Edition, Arnold took her spot in the band, beating out Karen Carpenter for the role. She stayed with the band until it disbanded in 1976.

After the two were introduced by Rogers, Arnold married singer Roger Miller. After The First Edition disbanded, Mary toured and recorded with Roger until his death in 1992. After his death, Mary became president of Roger's musical trust. In 2003, she sued Sony/ATV Music Publishing to regain the rights to Roger's music. She won in district court in 2010, gaining the rights and $900,000 in damages. However, the verdict was overturned upon appeal, and Sony retained the rights to Roger Miller's catalogue.

Arnold also performed with Waylon Jennings, Glen Campbell, and George Burns. She performed at the White House twice, before the Nixons with The First Edition and before the Fords with Roger Miller. She was inducted into the Iowa Rock 'n' Roll Hall of Fame in 2009. She last appeared with The First Edition at a 2015 panel at the Country Music Hall of Fame and Museum.
