= Coward of the County =

Single by Kenny Rogers

from the album Kenny
- B-side: "I Want to Make You Smile"
- Released: November 12, 1979
- Genre: Country
- Length: 4:20
- Label: United Artists
- Songwriters: Roger Bowling, Billy Edd Wheeler
- Producer: Larry Butler

Kenny Rogers singles chronology
"You Decorated My Life" (1979)	"Coward of the County" (1979)	"Don't Fall in Love with a Dreamer" (1980)

"Coward of the County" is a song written by Roger Bowling and Billy Edd Wheeler and recorded by American country music singer Kenny Rogers. The song was released in November 1979 as the second and final single from Rogers' multi-platinum album Kenny. It became a major crossover hit, topping the Billboard Country chart and reaching number three on the Hot 100 chart; it also topped the Cash Box singles chart and was a Top 10 hit in numerous other countries worldwide, topping the chart in Canada, the UK and Ireland.

== Content ==
The narrator sings about his ward and nephew Tommy, widely considered a coward. Tommy's nonviolent attitude was influenced by his father, who had died in prison when Tommy was ten years old. During Tommy's last visit to his father, from his deathbed Tommy's father pleaded with him to avoid the same mistakes that he had made ("promise me, son, not to do the things I've done..."), telling him that "turning the other cheek" is not a sign of weakness and advising him, "Son, you don't have to fight to be a man."

Years later, Tommy is in a relationship with a woman named Becky who loves and accepts him. One day while Tommy is at work, the three Gatlin brothers sexually assault Becky. When he returns home and finds Becky crying, he must choose between defending her honor and upholding his father's plea to "walk away from trouble when he can." He ultimately concludes he cannot let their actions go.

When Tommy enters the barroom, the Gatlins laugh at him, even more so when he seemingly turns to walk out. But to their surprise, Tommy locks the door, then, fueled by his long bottled-up aggression, fights all three Gatlins, such that when he left the barroom, "not a Gatlin boy was standing", and saying "this one's for Becky" as the last one goes down. He leaves the barroom, and reflects on his father's wishes, respectfully acknowledging that he lives up to them when he can, but "sometimes you gotta fight when you're a man."

== Reference to "The Gatlin Boys" ==
A misconception existed that mention of the "Gatlin boys ... there was three of them" in the song was a reference to the Gatlin Brothers, and this led to tension between the Gatlins and Rogers. However, in The Billboard Book of Number One Country Singles, Rogers stated that he was unaware of the connection and that he would have otherwise asked for the name to be changed. Larry Gatlin liked the song, and songwriter Billy Edd Wheeler denied that the lyric was a reference to the Gatlin Brothers.

Gatlin later claimed in an interview on The Adam Carolla Show that the song’s cowriter Roger Bowling held a personal grudge against him for unknown reasons. Gatlin stated that when Bowling won song of the year for "Lucille" at the 1977 CMA Awards, Gatlin approached Bowling to congratulate him, but Bowling said "fuck you, Gatlin!' and an exchange of harsh words followed. Gatlin claimed that the incident led to the inclusion of his name in the lyrics for "Coward of the County."

In a 2013 interview with the song's co-writer, Billy Edd Wheeler suggested that the beef between Bowling and Gatlin arose during a visit to the office of Kenny's producer Larry Butler. He said,

"Roger had crossed swords with Larry Gatlin in Larry Butler’s office. Roger was sitting there and Larry Butler said to Gatlin, “I suppose you know Roger Bowling?” Larry Gatlin replied, 'No, but I’m sure he knows me.' ... Roger Bowling was quick witted. Instantly he said, 'Gatlin, Gatlin? Uh, is your family in guns?' Supposedly, it pissed Gatlin off a bit."

== Charts ==
=== Weekly charts ===
Chart (1979–1980)	Peak position
Australian (Kent Music Report)	6
Austria (Ö3 Austria Top 40)	9
Belgium (Ultratop 50 Flanders)	8
Canada Top Singles (RPM)	1
Canada Adult Contemporary (RPM)	1
Canada Country Singles (RPM)	1
Ireland (IRMA)	1
Netherlands (Dutch Top 40)	7
Netherlands (Single Top 100)	8
New Zealand (Recorded Music NZ)	3
Switzerland (Schweizer Hitparade)	8
South Africa (Springbok)	12
Spain (AFYVE)	19
UK Singles Chart (Official Charts Company)	1
US Billboard Hot 100	3
US Adult Contemporary (Billboard)	5
US Hot Country Songs (Billboard)	1
US Cash Box Top 100	1
West Germany (GfK)	18

=== Year-end charts ===
Chart (1980)	Position
Australia (Kent Music Report)	38
Belgium (Ultratop Flanders)	84
Canada Top Singles (RPM)	4
Netherlands (Dutch Top 40)	75
New Zealand (Recorded Music NZ)	33
UK Singles (OCC)	9
US Billboard Hot 100	34
US Country Songs (Billboard)	9
US Cash Box Top 100	22

== Certifications ==
Region	Certification	Certified units/sales
Canada (Music Canada)	Gold	75,000^{^}
Mexico	—	100,000
United Kingdom (BPI)	Gold	500,000^{^}
United States (RIAA)	Gold	1,000,000^{^}
^{^} Shipments figures based on certification alone.

== Cover version ==
Jamaican dancehall musician Sister Nancy performed a version on her 1982 album "One, Two" as "Coward of the Country." Her version also includes elements of the songs "Banana Boat Song" and "In the Ghetto."

== Film adaptation ==
The song inspired a 1981 television movie of the same name directed by Dick Lowry, who also directed all but the last of The Gambler television movie series.

The film stars Rogers (who sang the song in the film) as Tommy's uncle Reverend Matthew Spencer, and features Fredric Lehne as Tommy Spencer, Largo Woodruff as Becky and William Schreiner as James Joseph "Jimmy Joe" Gatlin, the lead bully of the Gatlin family clan. The movie added several characters not mentioned in the song, including Car-Wash (Noble Willingham), a friend of the Spencers, Violet (Ana Alicia), another local girl who is also in love with Tommy and Lem Gatlin (Joe Dorsey), the father of the Gatlin boys.

Set in small-town Georgia during the onset of America's involvement in World War II, the film's plot expands on the story in the song. Tommy has vowed to his dying father to avoid fighting and violence. Jimmy Joe Gatlin proclaims that Becky is his girl, although Becky repeatedly states that she is not. Her rejection of Jimmy Joe's advances and her romance with Tommy cause the Gatlins to assault Becky just days before she and Tommy are to be married.

In a huge barroom brawl with the Gatlins, Tommy prevails with the help of Matthew, who has recently resigned his position with the church. After the Gatlin brothers are convicted of gang-raping Becky, Tommy joins the Marines and must report for duty after his wedding to Becky, and the church deacons invite Matthew to return.
