= You Decorated My Life =

Single by Kenny Rogers

from the album Kenny
- B-side: "One Man's Woman"
- Released: September 10, 1979
- Genre: Country
- Length: 3:38
- Label: United Artists
- Songwriter(s): Debbie Hupp, Bob Morrison
- Producer(s): Larry Butler

Kenny Rogers singles chronology
| "'Til I Can Make It on My Own" (1979) | "You Decorated My Life" (1979) | "Coward of the County" (1979) |

"You Decorated My Life" is a song written by Debbie Hupp and Bob Morrison, and recorded by American country music artist Kenny Rogers. It was released in September 1979 as the lead single from his album Kenny. It was a number-one hit on the Billboard Country Singles chart, and peaked at number seven on the Billboard Hot 100.

Cash Box said that "Rogers' smooth, sincere vocal reading here is once again up to his usual high standards."

At the 22nd Annual Grammy Awards in 1980, the song won the Grammy for Best Country Song for songwriters Hupp & Morrison.

== Chart performance ==
| Chart (1979–1980) | Peak position |
|---|---|
| Australian (Kent Music Report) | 61 |
| Canadian RPM Country Tracks | 1 |
| Canadian RPM Top Singles | 12 |
| Canadian RPM Adult Contemporary Tracks | 1 |
| Spain (AFYVE) | 16 |
| US Hot Country Songs (Billboard) | 1 |
| US Billboard Hot 100 | 7 |
| US Adult Contemporary (Billboard) | 2 |

| Year-end chart (1980) | Rank |
|---|---|
| US Top Pop Singles (Billboard) | 93 |
