= Ruby, Don't Take Your Love to Town =

Song written by Mel Tillis

Single by Johnny Darrell

from the album Ruby, Don't Take Your Love to Town
- B-side: "The Little Things I Love"
- Released: 1967
- Genre: Country
- Length: 2:16
- Label: United Artists
- Songwriter: Mel Tillis
- Producer: Bob Montgomery

Johnny Darrell singles chronology
"She's Mighty Gone" (1966)	"Ruby, Don't Take Your Love to Town" (1967)	"My Elusive Dreams" (1967)

Official audio
- "Ruby, Don't Take Your Love to Town" on YouTube

"Ruby, Don't Take Your Love to Town" is a song written by Mel Tillis about a paralyzed veteran who lies helplessly as his wife "paints up" to go out for the evening without him; he believes that she is going in search of a lover. As he hears the door slam behind her, he claims that he would murder her if he could move to get his gun, and pleads for her to reconsider. The line in the song about a "crazy Asian war" and the time of the song's release led to the interpretation that the song was about a veteran of the Vietnam War, although Tillis has said that he wrote the song about a veteran of World War II.

"Ruby" was first recorded by Waylon Jennings in 1966. Johnny Darrell reached number nine on the country charts with the song in 1967, and Kenny Rogers and the First Edition released it in 1969. Tillis's own version appeared on his 1967 album "Life's That Way" (re-released as "Life Turned Her That Way").

== The First Edition version ==
"Ruby, Don't Take Your Love to Town"
- Cover of the 1969 single

Single by Kenny Rogers and the First Edition

from the album Ruby, Don't Take Your Love to Town
- B-side: "Girl Get Ahold Of Yourself"
- Released: 1969
- Recorded: June 1968
- Genre: Country
- Length: 2:57
- Label: Reprise
- Songwriter: Mel Tillis
- Producer: Jimmy Bowen

Kenny Rogers and the First Edition singles chronology
"Once Again, She's All Alone" (1969)	"Ruby, Don't Take Your Love to Town" (1969)	"Reuben James" (1969)

Official audio
- "Ruby, Don't Take Your Love to Town" on YouTube

Kenny Rogers and the First Edition enjoyed success with the hits "Just Dropped In (To See What Condition My Condition Was In)" and "But You Know I Love You," and Rogers wanted to take his group more into a country music direction in 1969. They recorded their version of the song in a single take in June 1968, with Kenny Rogers singing the lead. Rogers version ends with his spoken plea: "For God's sake(s), turn around". The record became an international hit for them in 1969, reaching number two in the UK Singles Chart and staying in the top ten for 12 weeks. In the United States, it reached number six on the Billboard Hot 100 and number 39 on the country chart.

In 1977 Rogers was performing solo after the First Edition disbanded in early 1976. He made re-recordings of this and a number of other First Edition hits for his greatest hits package Ten Years of Gold. It was later issued in the UK as The Kenny Rogers Singles Album. Ten Years of Gold topped the US country charts under that title, and it was just as successful in the United Kingdom.

=== Weekly charts ===
Chart (1969)	Peak position
Australia (Go-Set)	5
U.S. Billboard Hot 100	6
U.S. Billboard Adult Contemporary	6
U.S. Billboard Hot Country Singles	39
U.S. Cash Box Top 100	7
Canadian RPM Top Singles	4
Canadian RPM Adult Contemporary	1
Canadian RPM Country Tracks	2
New Zealand (Listener)	6
UK Singles Chart	2
Dutch Top 40	4
Norway Singles Chart	9
Austrian Top 40	26

=== Year-end charts ===
Chart (1969)	Rank
Canada RPM Top Singles	71
UK	22
U.S. Billboard Hot 100	78
U.S. Cash Box	71

== Other famous versions ==
The song has been recorded many times by various artists. Gary Holton and Casino Steel's English-language version was a number one hit in Norway at the beginning of 1982. In Sweden the country group Rank Strangers placed a version at place 9 (Tio i Topp) in 1970.

== Answer songs ==
Geraldine Stevens released an answer song entitled "Billy, I've Got to Go to Town" in 1969. She had previously recorded successfully under the name Dodie Stevens. It is sung to the same melody with an arrangement quite similar to the First Edition version. "Billy" peaked at number 117 pop, number 57 country. It reached number 83 in Canada. In Stevens's song, Ruby affirms her love for her disabled husband. She pleads in turn for her man to have faith in her fidelity and her commitment to him even in his paralyzed condition.

== Video ==
A "social commentary" video consisting solely of a camera panning back and forth in a bedroom while the First Edition recording of the song played was shown at the end of a Huntley-Brinkley Report during 1969. Chet Huntley set up the video by linking it to the controversial Vietnam War and the sacrifices made by U.S. servicemen and their families. Chet Huntley and David Brinkley paused after the video and then signed off in their usual fashion.
