= Mickey Jones =

American musician and actor (1941–2018)

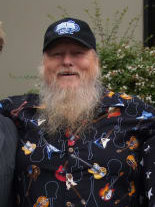
- Jones at a charity event in San Diego, California, 2006
- Born: June 10, 1941; Houston, Texas, U.S.
- Died: February 7, 2018 (aged 76); Simi Valley, California, U.S.
- Occupations: Actor; musician
- Years active: 1959–2015
- Spouse(s): Sandra Joel Davis (m. 1960–1976; divorced) Phyllis Jean Starr (m. 1980)
- Children: 2

Mickey Jones (June 10, 1941 – February 7, 2018) was an American musician and actor. He played drums with acts such as Trini Lopez and Bob Dylan, with whom he played on his 1966 world tour. He became a founding member of The First Edition with singer Kenny Rogers, and played on all of their albums. Overall, Jones played on 17 gold records from his musical career of over two decades.

Following the break-up of The First Edition in 1976, Jones concentrated on his career as a character actor, where he made many appearances in film and television.

== Early life and career ==
Mickey Jones was born on June 10, 1941, in Houston, Texas, to Fred Edward Jones, a U.S. Navy officer, and Frances Marie (née Vieregge) Jones, a homemaker. His sister, Cheryl Marie, died in 2006.

Jones attended Sunset High School in the Oak Cliff neighborhood of Dallas. It was during this time that he obtained and learned to play his first set of drums. After sitting in with several local bands, Jones and four schoolmates formed their own band, called The Catalinas. Although the band saw some local success, he was replaced by a new drummer, as Jones was only sixteen at the time, and the band wanted someone who was of legal age.

== Sideman drumming ==
After working as a freelance drummer with various acts, Jones was introduced to Trini Lopez. When Lopez's drummer became ill, he was asked to take his place and eventually became the band's new permanent drummer.

In 1959, Jones left Lopez's band to pursue a degree in business administration at North Texas State College (now University of North Texas). After college, he took a job at Rohr Aircraft in San Diego. Seeing that the life of a factory worker was not for him, Jones moved to Los Angeles to get back into the entertainment industry. He landed a job as a page at the NBC studios, while re-establishing his friendship with Lopez, who had moved to Los Angeles as well. Jones would again become Lopez's drummer, while Lopez would see much success with hits such as "If I Had a Hammer", "La Bamba" and "America".

In 1966, Jones was made an offer by Bob Dylan to join him as his back-up drummer. Replacing Levon Helm, who had quit, Jones would accompany Dylan with the other members of what would become The Band, on his world tour of Australia and Europe. It was during this tour while performing at the Free Trade Hall in Manchester, England, on May 17, 1966, that the audience jeered Dylan for playing the electric guitar during the latter half of the show. Jones' career with Dylan would be cut short when Dylan had to temporarily stop performing in order to recover from a motorcycle accident.

At this time, Jones had decided to pursue a career in acting. He had landed jobs as an extra, when in 1967 he was approached to be the drummer for a new group called The First Edition, with lead singer Kenny Rogers.

With hits such as "Something's Burning", "Ruby, Don't Take Your Love to Town" and "Just Dropped In (To See What Condition My Condition Was In)", The First Edition would see much success over the next ten years, even having their own television variety show, Rollin' on the River (later shortened to Rollin'), in the early 1970s.

== Acting career ==
After the breakup of The First Edition in 1976, Jones pursued a full-time career in acting. As a character actor, he would make many appearances in television and film. His early work included guest starring roles on shows such as The Rockford Files, The Incredible Hulk, Charlie’s Angels, The Dukes of Hazzard, CHiPs, M*A*S*H and Simon & Simon, and being a part of the cast of Flo, the short-lived spin-off to the CBS sitcom Alice. He was also known for his role as a crooked mechanic/sheriff in National Lampoon's Vacation (1983), and his role as Chris Farber, the associate of Ham Tyler (Michael Ironside) in the miniseries and weekly television series, V.

Jones also played a murdering biker in one episode of 21 Jump Street and was killed off himself by the henchmen of the man he initially had done the killing for. Later, Jones would have a cameo in Ironside's film Total Recall (1990). Jones had no scenes with Ironside – he played a Martian miner on a train with Doug Quaid (Arnold Schwarzenegger).

From 1991 to 1999, Jones had a recurring role as Pete Bilker (of K&B Construction) on the ABC sitcom Home Improvement. In 1992, he played a small but memorable role in the television show Northern Exposure episode "Heroes" as Chris Stevens' (John Corbett) deceased mentor, Brian Grady "Tooley" O'Toole, who is delivered to Chris in a wooden box. Other television appearances included ALF, Baywatch, Step by Step, Married... with Children, Boy Meets World, and Lizzie McGuire.

He appeared as the subway riding biker in a Breath Savers commercial. In 1996, he appeared in Sling Blade as the drummer in the band (a prominent speaking part in the band scenes), and Tin Cup, with fellow character actor Dennis Burkley. He and Burkley were commonly mistaken for each other.

In 2003, he appeared as Scooter in the musical film The Fighting Temptations, which costarred Cuba Gooding, Jr., Beyoncé Knowles, and Steve Harvey. In 2005, he contributed to the documentary, No Direction Home: Bob Dylan. From 2011 to 2014, he had a recurring role on the FX television show Justified, as Rodney "Hot Rod" Dunham, a marijuana distributor who ran a small band of criminals.

== Author ==
In 2007, Jones published his autobiography That Would Be Me, the title based on the catchphrase often used by his character on Home Improvement.

== Death ==
Jones died from complications of diabetes on February 7, 2018, aged 76. He is survived by his wife, Phyllis Jean Starr, and their two children, and three step children.

== Partial filmography ==
=== Films ===
- Wild in the Streets (1968)
- Tom Horn (1980) – Brown's Hole Rustler
- Stir Crazy (1980) – Guard #8
- Stand By Your Man (1981, TV Movie) – Eddie
- Making Love (1982) – Cowboy Musician
- Wrong Is Right (1982) – Gunman
- The Best Little Whorehouse in Texas (1982) – Henry
- Living Proof: The Hank Williams Jr. Story (1983, TV Movie) – Mickey
- China Lake (1983, Short) – Big Guy
- National Lampoon's Vacation (1983) – Mechanic
- Starman (1984) – Trucker
- Savage Dawn (1985) – Savage Zero
- Hunter's Blood (1986) – Wash Pot
- Welcome to 18 (1986) – Harper
- Extreme Prejudice (1987) – Chub Luke
- Nadine (1987) – Floyd
- Talking Walls (1987)
- The Couch Trip (1988) – Watkins
- It Takes Two (1988) – Bucholtz
- Dead Bang (1989) – Sleepy
- Homer & Eddie (1989) – Man at Pizza Joint
- Total Recall (1990) – Burly Miner
- Dutch (1991) – Truck Driver
- Pyrates (1991) – Wisconsin Del
- Out on a Limb (1992) – Virgil
- Black Ice (1992) – Lloyd Carter
- Night Trap (1993) – Bartender
- The Beverly Hillbillies (1993) – Spittin' Sam
- Forced to Kill (1994) – Neil
- Drop Zone (1994) – Deuce
- Sunchaser (1996) – Fuzzy, Biker #1
- Tin Cup (1996) – Turk
- Sling Blade (1996) – Monty Johnson
- The Fanatics (1997) – Rex Tweedy
- Ringmaster (1998) – Man on Show (uncredited)
- The Last Best Sunday (1999) – Bartender
- Grizzly Adams and the Legend of Dark Mountain (1999) – Sergeant Evans
- Vice (2000) – Officer Duke
- The Last Real Cowboys (2000, Short) – Slope
- The View from the Swing (2000) – Mountain Man
- Never Look Back (2000)
- Shattered Lies (2002) – Kenny Kingman
- Shattered Lies (2002) – William Holt
- The Fighting Temptations (2003) – Scooter
- True Legends of the West (2003) – Two Gun Sly Willy
- Bob Dylan - World Tour 1966: The Home Movies (2003) – Himself – The Band
- Iowa (2005) – Darrell McNeely
- No Direction Home: Bob Dylan (2005)
- Collier & Co. (2006)
- Penny Dreadful (2006) – Eddie
- Country Remedy (2006)
- Simple Things (2007) – Stan Slyder
- Corners (2007)
- High Desert (2007)
- Necrosis (2009) – Hank
- Downstream (2010) – Meat Vendor
- Thriftstore Cowboy (2012) – Billy Henley
- Rebel On The Highway (2018) – Uncle Mickey (final film role)

=== Television ===
- Rollin' on the River (1971) – First Edition Drummer
- The Dream Makers (1975, TV Movie) – Jesse
- The Rockford Files (1977) – Chubby Pool Player
- The Incredible Hulk (1978–1981) – George Rothman / Doc / Ricky Detter
- Charlie’s Angels (1979) – Bo Mackey
- The Dukes of Hazzard (1979) – B.B. Davenport
- Galactica 1980 (1980) – (Pilot Episode: Donzo)
- CHiPs (1980) Satan's Angels (Big Daddy)
- Flo (1980–1981) – Chester
- M*A*S*H (1981) – M.P. #2
- Simon & Simon (1982) - Ron - Survivor's Store
- Hear No Evil – (1982 made-for-TV-movie) Blackman
- Madame's Place (1982) - Pinhead Flanigan, Episode: "The Golden Mousetrap"
- The Master (1984) – Hog, Episode "State of the Union"
- V: The Series (1984–1985) – Chris Farber
- V: The Final Battle (1984) – Chris Farber
- The A Team (1985) – Season 3 - Episode 22 - Title: Bounty - Character: Billy Bob Cowboy
- Misfits of Science (1985) – Arnold Biefneiter
- ALF "On the Road Again" (1986) – Artie
- In The Heat of the Night "Country Mouse, City Mouse" (as Willie Baylor) (1989) – Willie Baylor
- 21 Jump Street (1989) – Bobo
- Baywatch (1990–1992) – Lonny / Red
- Home Improvement (1991–1999) – Pete Bilker
- Get a Life (1991) – Ray
- Human Target "Cool Hand Chance" (1992) - Haas
- Northern Exposure "Heroes" (as Chris' deceased mentor, Tooley) (1992–1994) – Toolie / Tooley
- Step by Step (1993) – Virgil
- Saved by the Bell: Wedding in Las Vegas (1994) – Ray
- Married... with Children (1996) – Parley Wayne Rockefeller
- Boy Meets World (1996–1999) – Ezekial / Milkshake Guy
- Beyond Belief: Fact or Fiction (1997)
- Son of the Beach (2000-2002) - Vernon
- Lizzie McGuire (2002) – Sonny Reid
- Entourage (2007) – Mickey Jones
- Justified (2011–2014) – Rodney 'Hot Rod' Dunham
- Workaholics (2012) – Arthur
- It's Always Sunny in Philadelphia (2013) – Gunther
- Growing Up Fisher (2014) – Ronnie
- Newsreaders (2015) – Kelson Habson

=== Music videos ===
- "Sunset Blvd" (2005)

== Book ==
- That Would Be Me: Rock & Roll Survivor To Hollywood Actor (2007)
