= The Gambler (album) =

Studio album by Kenny Rogers
- Released: November 15, 1978
- Recorded: 1978
- Studios: Jack Clement Recording (Nashville, Tennessee)
- Genre: Country
- Length: 39:44
- Label: United Artists Group
- Producer: Larry Butler

Kenny Rogers chronology
| Love or Something Like It (1978) | The Gambler (1978) | Classics (1979) |

Singles from The Gambler
- 1. "The Gambler" Released: November 15, 1978; 2. "She Believes in Me" Released: April 16, 1979

Professional ratings
Review scores
| Source | Rating |
|---|---|
| Allmusic | link |

The Gambler is the sixth studio album by American singer Kenny Rogers, released by United Artists in November 1978. One of his most popular, it has established Rogers' status as one of the most successful artists of the 1970s and 1980s. The album reached many markets around the world, such as the Far East and Jamaica, with Rogers later commenting "When I go to Korea or Hong Kong people say 'Ah, the gambler!'" (as per the sleeve notes to the 1998 released box set Through the Years on Capitol Records). The album has sold over 5 million copies.

== History ==
Rogers recorded the album at the Jack Clement Recording Studio in Nashville, Tennessee with producer Larry Butler.

The title track "The Gambler" was written by Don Schlitz, who was the first to record it. It was also covered by several other artists, but it was Kenny Rogers' adaptation of the tale that went on to top the country charts and won Rogers a Grammy Award for Best Male Country Vocal Performance in 1980, later becoming Rogers' signature song. Although Johnny Cash recorded the song first, Rogers' version was released first. Both this song and "She Believes in Me" became pop music hits, helping Rogers become well-known beyond country music circles. Although largely compiled from songs by some of the music business's top songwriters, such as Alex Harvey, Mickey Newbury, and Steve Gibb, Rogers continued to show his own talent for songwriting with "Morgana Jones".

In Britain, both the title cut and the album did very well in the country market, but both failed to reach the top 40 of the pop charts. In the 1980s the single of "The Gambler" was re-issued and made the top 100 sales list, but again charted outside the top 40. It wasn't until the song was re-issued in 2007 when the song was adopted by the England Rugby Team at the Rugby World Cup that it charted at its #22 peak.

Its popularity has led to many releases over the years. After United Artists was absorbed into EMI/Capitol in 1980, The Gambler was reissued on vinyl and cassette on the Liberty Records label. Several years later, Liberty issued an abridged version of the album, removing the track "Morgana Jones". EMI Manhattan Records released "The Gambler" on CD in the 1980s. An 'Original Master Recording' from Mobile Fidelity Sound Labs was released on vinyl (audiophile edition vinyl). Finally, The Gambler was released on Rogers' own Dreamcatcher Records in 2001 as part of the Kenny Rogers "Original Masters Series."

Additionally, "I Wish That I Could Hurt That Way Again" would later become a hit in 1986 for T. Graham Brown, whose version went to #3 on the country charts.

== Track listing ==
Side one
| No. | Title | Writer(s) | Length |
|---|---|---|---|
| 1. | "The Gambler" | Don Schlitz | 3:34 |
| 2. | "I Wish That I Could Hurt That Way Again" | Rafe Van Hoy, Don Cook, Curly Putman | 2:55 |
| 3. | "The King of Oak Street" | Alex Harvey | 4:55 |
| 4. | "Making Music for Money" | Harvey | 3:10 |
| 5. | "The Hoodooin' of Miss Fannie Deberry" | Harvey | 4:44 |

Side two
| No. | Title | Writer(s) | Length |
|---|---|---|---|
| 1. | "She Believes in Me" | Steve Gibb | 4:18 |
| 2. | "Tennessee Bottle" | Jim Ritchey | 3:59 |
| 3. | "Sleep Tight, Goodnight Man" | Sam Lorber, Jeff Silbar | 2:52 |
| 4. | "A Little More Like Me (The Crucifixion)" | Sonny Throckmorton | 2:47 |
| 5. | "San Francisco Mabel Joy" | Mickey Newbury | 3:36 |
| 6. | "Morgana Jones" | Kenny Rogers | 3:03 |

== Personnel ==
- Kenny Rogers – lead vocals
- Thomas Cain – keyboards (side 1: 5)
- Steve Glassmeyer – keyboards, soprano saxophone (side 1: 2), backing vocals
- Gene Golden – keyboards, backing vocals
- Hargus "Pig" Robbins – keyboards (side 1: 1)
- Edgar Struble – ARP synthesizer, clavinet, congas, backing vocals (side 2: 11)
- Jimmy Capps – guitars (side 1: 1)
- Randy Dorman – guitars, backing vocals (side 1: 5)
- Ray Edenton – guitars (side 1: 1)
- Rick Harper – guitars
- Billy Sanford – guitars (side 1: 1)
- Jerry Shook – guitars
- Tony Joe White – guitars (side 1: 5)
- Reggie Young – guitars
- Pete Drake – steel guitar (side 1: 1)
- Tommy Allsup – six-string bass guitar
- Bob Moore – upright bass (side 1: 1)
- Dennis Wilson – upright bass
- Eddy Anderson – drums, percussion
- Jerry Carrigan – drums, percussion (side 1: 1)
- Bobby Daniels – drums, percussion, backing vocals
- Dottie West - backing vocals (side 1: 1) (uncredited)
- Byron Metcalf – drums, percussion (side 2: 1)
- Bill Justis – string arrangements (side 1: 3, side 2: 1, 3, 5)
- Byron Bach – strings
- George Brinkley – strings
- Marvin Chantry – strings
- Roy Christensen – strings
- Carl Gorodetzky – strings
- Lennie Haight – strings
- Sheldon Kurland – strings
- Steven Smith – strings
- Gary Vanosdale – strings
- Pamela Vanosdale – strings
- Dottie West – backing vocals (side 1: 1)
- The Jordanaires – backing vocals (side 1: 1)
- Bill Medley – backing vocals (side 1: 5)
- Mickey Newbury – backing vocals (side 1: 5)

== Producer ==
- Producer – Larry Butler
- Engineer – Billy Sherrill
- Recorded at Jack Clement Recording Studio (Nashville, TN).
- Mastered by Bob Sowell at Master Control (Nashville, TN).
- Art Direction and Design – Bill Burks
- Photography – Reid Miles
- Management – Ken Kragen

== Charts ==
=== Weekly charts ===
| Chart (1978–80) | Peak position |
|---|---|
| Australian Albums (Kent Music Report) | 21 |
| Canada Top Albums/CDs (RPM) | 6 |
| Canada Country Albums/CDs (RPM) | 1 |
| US Billboard 200 | 12 |
| US Top Country Albums (Billboard) | 1 |

=== Year-end charts ===
| Chart (1979) | Position |
|---|---|
| Canada Top Albums/CDs (RPM) | 15 |
| US Billboard 200 | 11 |
| US Top Country Albums (Billboard) | 1 |
| Chart (1980) | Position |
| US Billboard 200 | 18 |
| US Top Country Albums (Billboard) | 3 |

== Certifications ==
| Region | Certification | Certified units/sales |
|---|---|---|
| Canada (Music Canada) | 4× Platinum | 400,000^{^} |
| New Zealand (RMNZ) | Gold | 7,500^{‡} |
| Spain (Promusicae) | Gold | 50,000^{^} |
| United States (RIAA) | 5× Platinum | 5,000,000^{^} |
^{^} Shipments figures based on certification alone.^{‡} Sales+streaming figures based on certification alone.
