= Daytime Friends (song) =

Single by Kenny Rogers

from the album Daytime Friends
- B-side: "We Don't Make Love Anymore" (US and most other countries); "Lying Again" (Germany)
- Released: August 1, 1977
- Genre: Country
- Length: 3:14
- Label: United Artists
- Songwriter(s): Ben Peters
- Producer(s): Larry Butler

Kenny Rogers singles chronology
"Lucille" (1977)	"Daytime Friends" (1977)	"Sweet Music Man" (1977)

"Daytime Friends" is a song written by Ben Peters and recorded by American country music artist Kenny Rogers. It was released in August 1977 as the lead single from the album of the same name. The song was Rogers' second number one country hit as a solo artist. The single stayed at number one for one week and spent a total of twelve weeks on the country chart. It peaked at No. 28 on the Billboard Hot 100 and reached No. 13 on the adult contemporary chart.

The single's B-side, "We Don't Make Love Anymore," was composed by Rogers and Marianne Gordon and later covered by Anne Murray and was released on her album Let's Keep It That Way. The single's German B-Side was "Lying Again".

== Content ==
The lyrics of this mid-tempo song describe a couple having an affair. The woman and her unsuspecting husband are friendly with the singer and his unknowing wife. During the day, the woman and the singer must act like they are only friends, even though they have secret romantic meetings at night.

== Song idea ==
In a posting on Classic Country Songs on Facebook on October 1, 2021, Peters claimed he got the idea from watching a weather report on WSMV Channel 4 in Nashville (then WSM-TV) in 1975. The meteorologist, Pat Sajak (who would later host Wheel of Fortune), talked about "daytime trends and nighttime showers". This led Peters to write the song.

== Charts ==
=== Weekly charts ===
Chart (1977)	Peak position
Australian (Kent Music Report)	69
Canadian RPM Top Singles	21
Canadian RPM Country Tracks	1
Canadian RPM Adult Contemporary	1
New Zealand Singles Chart	16
UK Singles Chart	39
US Billboard Hot 100	28
US Hot Country Songs (Billboard)	1
US Billboard Easy Listening	13

=== Year-end charts ===
Chart (1977)	Position
US Hot Country Songs (Billboard)	17
