= The Gambler (song) =

1978 single by Kenny Rogers

Single by Kenny Rogers

from the album The Gambler
- B-side: "Momma's Waiting"
- Released: November 15, 1978
- Studio: Jack Clement Recording (Nashville, Tennessee)
- Genre: Country
- Length: 3:34
- Label: United Artists
- Songwriter: Don Schlitz
- Producer: Larry Butler

Kenny Rogers singles chronology
"Anyone Who Isn't Me Tonight" (1978)	"The Gambler" (1978)	"All I Ever Need Is You" (1979)

Music video
- "The Gambler" on YouTube

"The Gambler" is a song written by Don Schlitz and recorded by several artists, most famously by American country singer Kenny Rogers.

== Inspiration and early versions ==
Schlitz wrote the song in August 1976 when he was 23 years old. On the American Top 40 radio program of February 3, 1979, Casey Kasem reported that Schlitz said of "The Gambler": "Something more than me wrote that song. I'm convinced of that. I really had no idea where the song was coming from. There was something going through my head, which was my father. It was just a song, and it somehow filtered through me. Six weeks later I received the final verse. Months later it came to me that it was inspired by, and possibly a gift from, my father." Schlitz's father had died in 1976.

Schlitz shopped the song around Nashville for two years before Bobby Bare recorded it on his album Bare at the urging of Shel Silverstein. Bare's version did not catch on and was never released as a single, so Schlitz recorded it himself, but that version failed to chart higher than No. 65. Other musicians took notice and recorded the song in 1978, including Johnny Cash, who put it on his album Gone Girl.

== Kenny Rogers version ==
Rogers recorded the song at the Jack Clement Recording Studio in Nashville, Tennessee with producer Larry Butler. Musicians who played on the song included Ray Edenton and Jimmy Capps on acoustic guitar, Pete Drake on pedal steel guitar, Billy Sanford on electric guitar, Jerry Carrigan on drums, Hargus "Pig" Robbins on piano, Bob Moore on acoustic bass, Tommy Allsup on the “tic-tac” (baritone) bass guitar, and the Jordanaires and Dottie West (uncredited) on backing vocals.

Released in November 1978 as the title track from Rogers's album The Gambler, this version of the song achieved mainstream success. Rogers's version was a No. 1 country hit, and made its way to the pop charts at a time when country songs rarely crossed over, winning him the Grammy Award for Best Male Country Vocal Performance in 1980.

In 2006, Schlitz featured in Rogers's career retrospective documentary The Journey, in which he praised both Rogers's and producer Larry Butler's contributions to the song, stating "they added several ideas that were not mine, including the new guitar intro".

== Content ==
The lyrics describe the song's narrator meeting a gambler one summer evening while riding aimlessly on a train. The gambler can tell from the look on the narrator's face that he is in poor circumstances and offers him advice in exchange for a drink of whisky. After the narrator obliges with the whisky as well as a cigarette, the gambler describes his outlook on life using poker metaphors:

You got to know when to hold 'em, know when to fold 'em
Know when to walk away and know when to run
You never count your money when you're sittin' at the table
There'll be time enough for countin' when the dealing's done.

The gambler states that every situation can be played for better or worse. The trick is to recognize what is worth keeping, choose one's battles, and not dwell on losses. After he finishes talking, the gambler crushes the cigarette out, and dies in his sleep during the night, leaving the narrator to ponder his wisdom alone.

== Personnel ==
- Kenny Rogers – lead vocals
- Dottie West – backing vocals
- Hoyt Hawkins – backing vocals
- Neal Matthews Jr. – backing vocals
- Gordon Stoker – backing vocals
- Ray Walker – backing vocals
- Jimmy Capps – acoustic guitar
- Ray Edenton – acoustic guitar
- Billy Sanford – electric guitar
- Pete Drake – pedal steel guitar
- Hargus Robbins – piano
- Tommy Allsup – bass
- Jerry Carrigan – drums, shaker

== Chart performance ==
=== Weekly charts ===
Chart (1978–1979)	Peak position
Argentina	2
Australian (Kent Music Report)	25
Canada Adult Contemporary Tracks (RPM)	6
Canada Country Tracks (RPM)	2
Canada Top Singles (RPM)	8
New Zealand (Recorded Music NZ)	29
Spain (AFYVE)	12
UK Singles (The Official Charts Company)	22
US Hot Country Songs (Billboard)	1
US Billboard Hot 100	16
US Adult Contemporary (Billboard)	3
US Cash Box Top 100	13

=== Year-end charts ===
Chart (1979)	Rank
Canada Top Singles (RPM)	65
US Billboard Hot 100	40
US Adult Contemporary (Billboard)	13
US Hot Country Songs (Billboard)	7
US Cash Box	94

== Certifications ==
Region	Certification	Certified units/sales
Denmark (IFPI Danmark)	Platinum	90,000^{‡}
New Zealand (RMNZ)	2× Platinum	40,000^{*}
United Kingdom (BPI)	2× Platinum	1,200,000^{‡}
^{*} Sales figures based on certification alone.^{‡} Sales+streaming figures based on certification alone.

== Legacy ==
The song became Rogers's signature song and most enduring hit. It was one of five consecutive songs by Rogers to hit No. 1 on the Billboard country music charts. On the pop chart, the song made it to No. 16, and No. 3 on the Easy Listening chart. It inspired a series of TV movies loosely inspired by the song and set in the Old West, starting with Kenny Rogers as The Gambler (1980) and followed by Kenny Rogers as The Gambler: The Adventure Continues (1983), Kenny Rogers as The Gambler, Part III: The Legend Continues (1987), The Gambler Returns: The Luck of the Draw (1991), and Gambler V: Playing for Keeps (1994).

As of November 13, 2013, the digital sales of the single stood at 798,000 copies and after all these years the single has yet to be certified gold by RIAA certifications. In 2018, it was selected for preservation in the National Recording Registry by the Library of Congress as being "culturally, historically, or aesthetically significant". The song was ranked number 18 out of the top 76 songs of the 1970s by Internet radio station WDDF Radio in their 2016 countdown. Following Rogers' death on March 20, 2020, "The Gambler" soared to No. 1 on Billboard's Digital Song Sales chart, followed by "Islands in the Stream", with Dolly Parton, which debuted at No. 2.

== In popular culture ==
=== Sports ===
- The Houston Gamblers of the United States Football League, who played in Rogers' hometown, were named after the song.
- Former Major League Baseball pitcher Kenny Rogers was nicknamed "The Gambler" after the song, due to sharing a name with the song's artist.
- The song is the unofficial 'anthem' for Edinburgh University Men's Hockey Club, where the club are colloquially called "The Gamblers".

=== Television ===
- In 1979, when Rogers guest-starred in a season 4 episode of The Muppet Show, he performed this song with a Muppet character. Rogers is shown seated on a train with three Muppets, one of them The Gambler (portrayed by Jerry Nelson). Rogers sings the opening verse, while Nelson sings most of The Gambler's dialog, then falls asleep just as Rogers concludes the song's story. After he dies, The Gambler's spirit rises from his Muppet body, singing backup and dances to the song's last two choruses, and lets a deck of cards fly from his hand before fading away.
- A caricature parody of Kenny Rogers singing the song appeared in the 1993 Animaniacs Pinky and the Brain short "Bubba Bo Bob Brain" (season 1, episode 34). The lyrics to this version were changed to refer to the children's card game Go Fish: "You gotta know how to cut 'em, know how to shuffle, know how to deal the cards before you play fish with me."
- In the series King of the Hill, “The Gambler” is repeatedly shown to be one of lead character Hank Hill's favorite songs.
- In the 2007 episode of The Office "Beach Games," Kevin Malone sings the verses of the song in the bus while the rest of the staff joins him for the chorus. This was a nod to Kevin's gambling problem.
- In an episode of Monday Night Raw in 2001, The Rock sang the chorus of the song to "Stone Cold" Steve Austin.
- The song is parodied in a 2023 episode of American Dad!, "The Pink Sphinx Holds Her Hearts on the Turn". Roger claims to be the actual Gambler and that he "fell asleep very very hard" rather than die on the night he met Kenny Rogers, later performing his own version and singing "Kenny Rogers is a liar".

=== Other ===
- Country Yossi parodied the song in the 1980s on his Wanted album as "The Rabbi".
- In the 2006 Beaconsfield Mine collapse, trapped miners Brant Webb and Todd Russell sang "The Gambler" together to raise their spirits, as it was the only song they both knew the words and music to.
- On July 21, 2009, the song was released for the music game Rock Band as a playable track as part of the "Rock Band Country Track Pack" compilation disc. It was made available via digital download at the end of 2009.
- A 2014 Geico television commercial features Rogers singing part of the song a cappella during a card game, to the displeasure of the other players.
- Call of Duty: Black Ops 7 uses the song in a trailer featuring a new map for Season 1 of Warzone.
