= Just Dropped In (To See What Condition My Condition Was In) =

1967 song written by Mickey Newbury

"Just Dropped In (To See What Condition My Condition Was In)" is a psychedelic rock song written by Mickey Newbury and best known from a version by the First Edition, recorded in 1967 and released to popular success in 1968. Said to reflect the LSD experience, the song was intended to be a warning about the dangers of using the drug. The song was first recorded by Jerry Lee Lewis, backed by members of the Memphis Boys, the chart-topping rhythm section at Chips Moman's American Sounds Studio in Memphis, on May 9, 1967. The song appeared on Lewis's album Soul My Way, released November 1, 1967. Before Lewis's record was issued, on October 10, 1967, it was recorded by Teddy Hill & the Southern Soul as a single on Rice Records (Rice 5028 b/w "Stagger Lee") and produced by Norro Wilson.

== The First Edition version ==
"Just Dropped In (To See What Condition My Condition Was In)"

Single by the First Edition

from the album The First Edition
- B-side: "Shadow in the Corner of Your Mind"
- Released: January 1968
- Recorded: October 1967
- Genre: Psychedelic rock
- Length: 3:20
- Label: Reprise
- Songwriter: Mickey Newbury
- Producer: Mike Post

The First Edition singles chronology
"I Found a Reason / Ticket to Nowhere" (1967)	"Just Dropped In (To See What Condition My Condition Was In)" (1968)	"But You Know I Love You" (1968)

"Just Dropped In ..." was recorded by the First Edition (with Kenny Rogers on lead vocals) in October 1967, and peaked at number five on the Billboard charts and number three in Canada. The song ranked number 99 on the Canadian top 100 songs of 1968. It was Rogers's first top ten hit. The song captures the psychedelic era of the late 1960s with a hard rock edge that stands in stark contrast to much of the group's other music, which leaned towards country rock and emphasized harmony vocals. Nonetheless, "Just Dropped In ..." led to the group's first national TV appearance on The Smothers Brothers Comedy Hour. The song was the group's second single from their debut album, The First Edition. Producer Mike Post reversed a few riffs to create the intro; the guitar solo played by Glen Campbell was heavily compressed and a tremolo effect was used to achieve its sound. Another studio guitarist, Mike Deasy, provided the acoustic lead guitar parts. The track was recorded by Jimmy Valentine at "Valentine Recording Studios" located in Valley Village California. When Rogers signed with United Artists Records, in the mid-1970s after the breakup of the First Edition, he re-recorded the track for his Ten Years of Gold album. The First Edition version appears in:

- The "Gutterballs" dream sequence from the Coen brothers' 1998 film The Big Lebowski,
- The credits sequence of the 2000 game Driver 2 by Reflections Interactive,
- The 2010 action movie Faster,
- The 2015 HBO documentary Going Clear: Scientology and the Prison of Belief,
- Season 3, episode 1 of the TV series Chuck: "Chuck Versus the Pink Slip",
- Season 1, episode 2 of the TV series Rowan & Martin's Laugh-In,
- Season 3, episode 1 of the TV series True Detective,
- Season 3, episode 1 of the TV series Goliath,
- Season 3, episode 4 of the TV series Young Sheldon,
- Season 3, episode 9 of the TV series Difficult People,
- The title screen and end credits of the 2013 video game Stick It to the Man!,
- The March 5, 2020 edition of the comic strip Zippy the Pinhead.
