= Lucille (Kenny Rogers song) =

Single by Kenny Rogers

from the album Kenny Rogers
- B-side: "Till I Get It Right"
- Released: January 24, 1977
- Genre: Country
- Length: 3:40
- Label: United Artists
- Songwriters: Roger Bowling; Hal Bynum
- Producer: Larry Butler

Kenny Rogers singles chronology
"Laura (What's He Got That I Ain't Got)" (1976)	"Lucille" (1977)	"Daytime Friends" (1977)

Official audio
- "Lucille" on YouTube

"Lucille" is a song written by Roger Bowling and Hal Bynum, and recorded by American country music artist Kenny Rogers. It was released in January 1977 as the second and final single from the album Kenny Rogers. It became Rogers's first major hit as a solo artist after leaving the successful country/rock group the First Edition the previous year. An international hit, it reached number one on the Billboard Country Singles chart and number 5 on the Billboard Hot 100. Overseas, "Lucille" reached the top of the UK Singles Chart in June 1977, the first of Rogers's two number one singles there.

The song was nominated for the Grammy Award for Best Country Song and Rogers won the Grammy Award for Best Male Country Vocal Performance in 1978.

== Content ==
The song, told by the narrator (Rogers), tells the story of a man in a bar in Toledo, Ohio, who acquaints himself with a downhearted married woman named Lucille. An inebriated Lucille admits her unhappiness in life and her longing for adventure. Her husband arrives and approaches the two; the narrator is intimidated by the man. The brokenhearted husband, starting to shake, scorns her for her inconvenient timing in abandoning him "with four hungry children and a crop in the field", leaving him with a "hurtin'" that won't heal. After the husband leaves, Lucille and the narrator make their way to a hotel room. Once there, however, the narrator is unable to engage romantically, in spite of her willingness and her beauty. He keeps recalling the husband's haunting words.

== Chart performance ==
=== Weekly charts ===
Chart (1977)	Peak position
Australian (Kent Music Report)	7
Austria (Ö3 Austria Top 40)	8
Belgium (Ultratop 50 Flanders)	17
Belgium (Ultratop 50 Wallonia)	39
Canada Country Tracks (RPM)	1
Canada Top Singles (RPM)	1
Canada Adult Contemporary Tracks (RPM)	1
Germany (GfK)	10
Ireland (IRMA)	2
Netherlands (Dutch Top 40)	16
Netherlands (Single Top 100)	17
New Zealand (Recorded Music NZ)	2
South Africa (Springbok Radio)	1
Switzerland (Schweizer Hitparade)	3
UK Singles (Official Charts Company)	1
US Hot Country Songs (Billboard)	1
US Billboard Hot 100	5
US Billboard Adult Contemporary	10

=== Year-end charts ===
Chart (1977)	Rank
Australia (Kent Music Report)	25
Canada Top Singles	17
New Zealand	3
South Africa	4
UK	20
US Billboard Hot 100	43
US Adult Contemporary (Billboard)	39
US Hot Country Songs (Billboard)	3
