= Sheldon Kurland =

American musician (1928–2010)

- Also known as: Shelly Kurland
- Born: June 9, 1928; Brooklyn, New York
- Died: January 6, 2010 (aged 81) Nashville, Tennessee
- Genres: Country music
- Occupations: Musician and arranger
- Instrument: Violin
- Formerly of: Shelly Kurland Strings

Sheldon "Shelly" Kurland (June 9, 1928 – January 6, 2010) was an American violinist and musical arranger who worked as a session musician in Nashville and provided arrangements for a number of prominent country musicians.

== Life and career ==
Sheldon Kurland was a native of Brooklyn, New York, the son of Samuel and Beatrice Kurland and brother of Elaine Todd Koren. His parents were strong advocates of the arts and his father started teaching Sheldon the violin and Elaine the piano when they were five. Both children had great musical talent however Elaine enjoyed writing more and eventually became an accomplished author. Sheldon continued to be taught by his father, at the Henry Street Settlement and with Ivan Galamian until he entered Juilliard School in New York City, where he was trained as a classical musician. As a boy, he was a winner of the Major Bowes Amateur Hour, a popular radio show in New York City. After receiving a master's degree, he began his professional career at Cornell University as a professor and touring with the Cornell University Trio. In 1964 he moved to Nashville to accept a faculty position at Peabody College.

After arriving in Nashville, Kurland began performing as a session musician for producers such as Chet Atkins and Owen Bradley who were creating a new "Nashville sound" that incorporated classical strings in place of the fiddle sound that had characterized country music. He was to play on tens of thousands of sessions, often as leader of a group credited as the Shelly Kurland Strings. In the late 1960s he resigned his teaching position to become a full-time musician.

Music writer Robert K. Oermann credits Kurland with playing a major role in the "sweetening of the sound" that gave Nashville recordings a "crossover appeal" during the 1970s, when "the Shelly Kurland Strings were on everything." The group was a perennial winner of annual "Super Picker Awards", recognizing the musicians who performed on the most number-one records in the previous year.

His credits as an arranger included "Half the Way" and "When I Dream" for Crystal Gayle and "I Wouldn't Have Missed It for the World" for Ronnie Milsap. Other names of musicians he worked with included Johnny Cash, Neil Young, Waylon Jennings, Willie Nelson, Dolly Parton, George Burns, Jimmy Buffett, Conway Twitty, Eddy Arnold, Amy Grant, Hank Snow, Bobby Bare, Kris Kristofferson, George Hamilton IV, Loretta Lynn and Reba McEntire.

Kurland and his wife Barbara were parents to three children, including movie sound artist Peter Kurland, director of innovative school programs Wendy Kurland, and Bluebird Cafe owner Amy Kurland. One of his violins and other memorabilia are in the Musicians Hall of Fame and Museum in Nashville. His music awards were among the music items that decorated the walls of the Bluebird Cafe.

Kurland retired from music in the 1980s. He died in Nashville on January 6, 2010, at age 81. His book, An Adult Guide to the Orchestra, was published posthumously.
