= Kenny Rogers (album) =

Studio album by Kenny Rogers
- Released: January 1977
- Studios: American Sound (Memphis, Tennessee); Jack Clement Recording (Nashville, Tennessee)
- Length: 35:47
- Label: United Artists
- Producer: Larry Butler

Kenny Rogers chronology
Love Lifted Me (1976)	Kenny Rogers (1977)	Daytime Friends (1977)

Singles from Kenny Rogers
- 1. "Laura (What's He Got That I Ain't Got)" Released: 1976; 2. "Lucille" Released: January 24, 1977

Professional ratings
Review scores
Source	Rating
AllMusic	4/5 stars
Record Mirror	2/5 stars

Kenny Rogers is the second studio album by American singer Kenny Rogers from United Artists Records, released in 1977. The album marked his first major solo success following the minor success of Love Lifted Me in 1976.

The album produced two singles. The first single, 1976's "Laura (What He's Got That I Ain't Got?)", peaked at #19. This song was originally a #1 country hit for Leon Ashley in 1967. In 1977, Kenny gained stardom with the single "Lucille", which climbed to the top of the country charts (both in the U.S. and Canada) and placing him squarely on the U.S. Hot 100 in the #5 position. It also blew open his solo career in the UK, reaching #1 there. Another track from the album is "I Wasn't Man Enough" which makes appearances on some of Rogers's greatest hits compilations in years to come.

This was the first of twelve No. 1 albums for Rogers on the Country chart. It ranked as high as #30 overall and was certified Platinum in the U.S. (also reaching Gold in Canada).

== Track listing ==
No.	Title	Writer(s)	Length
1.	"Laura (What's He Got That I Ain't Got)"	Leon Ashley, Margie Singleton	2:52
2.	"I Wasn't Man Enough"	Larry Butler, Roger Bowling	3:30
3.	"Mother Country Music"	Joe Nixon	2:49
4.	"Why Don't We Go Somewhere and Love"	Kenny O'Dell, Larry Henley	3:31
5.	"Green Green Grass of Home"	Curly Putman	3:35
6.	"'Til I Get It Right"	Larry Henley, Red Lane	3:05
7.	"Lucille"	Bowling, Hal Bynum	3:40
8.	"The Son of Hickory Holler's Tramp"	Dallas Frazier	3:12
9.	"Lay Down Beside Me"	Don Williams	3:55
10.	"Puttin' In Overtime at Home"	Ben Peters	3:00
11.	"While I Play the Fiddle"	Ray Willis, Ronnie Sessions	2:38

== Personnel ==
- Kenny Rogers – lead vocals
- Bobby Wood, Charles "Chuck" Cochran, George Richey, Hargus "Pig" Robbins, Larry Butler – keyboards
- Shane Keister – Moog synthesizer
- Billy Sanford, Dale Sellers, David Kirby, Fred Carter Jr., Jerry Shook, Jimmy Capps, Johnny Christopher, Pete Wade, Ray Edenton, Reggie Young, Steve Gibson – guitars
- Pete Drake – steel guitar
- Joe Osborn – bass guitar
- Tommy Allsup – six-string bass guitar
- Bob Moore – upright bass
- Buddy Harman, Jerry Carrigan, Kenny Malone – drums, percussion
- Tommy Williams – violin
- Brenton Banks, Byron Bach, Carl Gorodetzky, Gary Vanosdale, George Binkley, Lennie Haight, Marvin Chantry, Pam Sixfin, Roy Christensen, Sheldon Kurland, Stephanie Woolf, Steven Smith – strings
- Bill Justis – string arrangements
- Bergen White, Buzz Cason, Don Gant, Johnny MacRae, The Jordanaires, Larry Keith, Steve Pippin – backing vocals

== Production ==
- Producer – Larry Butler
- Engineers – Harold Lee and Billy Sherrill
- Recorded at American Studios and Jack Clement Recording Studios (Nashville, TN).
- Mastered by Bob Sowell at Master Control (Nashville, TN).
- Art Direction – Ria Lewerke
- Photography – David Brandenberg
- Typography – Michael Manoogian

== Charts ==
=== Weekly charts ===
Chart (1977)	Peak position
Australian Albums (Kent Music Report)	61
Canada Top Albums/CDs (RPM)	17
New Zealand Albums (RMNZ)	5
UK Albums (Official Charts)	14
US Billboard 200	30
US Top Country Albums (Billboard)	1

=== Year-end charts ===
Chart (1977)	Position
Canada Top Albums/CDs (RPM)	98
US Top Country Albums (Billboard)	4

== Certifications ==
Region	Certification	Certified units/sales
Canada (Music Canada)	Platinum	100,000^{^}
United States (RIAA)	Platinum	1,000,000
^{^} Shipments figures based on certification alone.
