= Kenny Rogers and the First Edition =

American band

- Promotional photo of the First Edition in early 1968

Background information
- Origin: California
- Genres: Country; country rock; sunshine pop; pop rock
- Years active: 1967–1976; 2010; 2014–2015
- Labels: Reprise; Jolly Rogers
- Past members: Kenny Rogers; Mickey Jones; Terry Williams; Mike Settle; Thelma Camacho; Mary Arnold; Kin Vassy; Jimmy Hassell; John Hobbs; Gene Lorenzo

Kenny Rogers and the First Edition, until 1970 billed as the First Edition, were an American band. The band's style was difficult to singularly classify, as it incorporated elements of country, rock and psychedelic pop. Its stalwart members were Kenny Rogers (lead vocals and bass guitar), Mickey Jones (drums and percussion) and Terry Williams (guitar and vocals). The band formed in 1967, with folk musician Mike Settle (guitar and backing vocals) and the operatically trained Thelma Camacho (lead vocals) completing the lineup.

As the counterculture of the 1960s was developing, the First Edition signed with Reprise Records in 1967 and had their first big hit in early 1968 with the psychedelic single "Just Dropped In (To See What Condition My Condition Was In)" (US No. 5). After other chart hits, "But You Know I Love You" (US No. 19) and "Tell It All Brother" (US No. 17), the group, newly billed as "Kenny Rogers and the First Edition", once again hit the top ten, this time in 1969 with the topical "Ruby, Don't Take Your Love to Town" (US No. 6, UK No.2).

For the next six years, the First Edition enjoyed worldwide success. By the mid-1970s, frontman Kenny Rogers had embarked on a solo music career, becoming one of the top-selling country artists of all time.

== Early days ==
Kenny Rogers and the First Edition were mostly made up of former members of the New Christy Minstrels who felt creatively stifled. The exception was Mickey Jones, who had been part of Bob Dylan's backing group on his first electric world tour. In 1967, with the help of Terry Williams's mother, who worked for producer and executive Jimmy Bowen, they signed with Reprise and recorded their first single together, "I Found a Reason", which had minor sales. Settle had first come up with the idea of forming the band as his work took on the characteristics of rock. Over the previous seven years, Settle had been writing decidedly more folk-oriented songs, most notably the oft-covered "Sing Hallelujah".

It was their follow-up (sung by Rogers), the psychedelic single "Just Dropped In (To See What Condition My Condition Was In)", that first got notice. The single, with an arrangement by their producer, Mike Post, had Glen Campbell playing the backward guitar intro and Mike Deasy providing various psychedelic sounds. It became a hit early in 1968, climbing to No. 5 on the Billboard Hot 100. Williams played the solo that later led Jimi Hendrix to tell Rogers that it was his favorite record. The group's next three single releases failed commercially, as did their second album. The 1968 release "But You Know I Love You" (composed by Settle) possessed a distinctive brass-tinged country-folk sound, broadening their fan base. In the group's rendition on The Smothers Brothers Comedy Hour that aired on December 8, 1968, the audience was unwittingly fooled into applauding too soon, right after the false ending but well before the real ending. The record peaked at No. 19 on the Hot 100 just under a year after "Just Dropped In" was at its Billboard summit.

According to Jones's book That Would Be Me, Camacho was fired from the group in late 1968 (soon after the release of "But You Know I Love You" and the aforementioned Smothers Brothers television appearance, but before the record would chart on the Hot 100), after missing too many gigs and rehearsals. For her part, Camacho did not see it the same way. She has stated that while she always loved being with them in the studio, the road was too hard on her from a health and personal standpoint. All agreed that the situation could not continue, and she was replaced by her roommate, Mary Arnold, an Iowa-born singer who beat out newcomer Karen Carpenter for the job. Camacho appears on the first three LPs plus half of the fourth album. Arnold made her debut on "Reuben James".

By the end of the decade Rogers had long brown hair, an earring, and pink sunglasses. Known affectionately in retrospect as "Hippie Kenny". Rogers had a notably smoother vocal style at the time. During mid-1969 the band scored another Top Ten hit with Mel Tillis's "Ruby, Don't Take Your Love to Town". Jones's drumming was part of the hook. At Rogers's shows the song was often clapped along to, or joked around with, but it was meant seriously at the time. Telling the graphic story of a crippled veteran was admirably daring at the height of America's involvement with the war in Vietnam. The song lyrics were originally meant to address the Korean War, albeit in such a vague way that it could have referred to Korea, Vietnam, or even the Japanese attack on Pearl Harbor. The song was picked up by some disc jockeys, and there was suddenly great demand to release the final track recorded for, and included on, the First Edition '69 album. In order to release "Ruby" at the same time as the "But You Know I Love You" soundalike "Once Again She's All Alone", the group renamed themselves "Kenny Rogers and the First Edition". When "Ruby" became the hit, the name stuck. Williams later said that this made him feel like one of Gladys Knight's Pips. This, their third major hit single, like the previous two featured Rogers on lead, along with the band name change, these factors cemented Rogers's fate as a global household name.

== Prime period ==
Kenny Rogers and the First Edition had five hits. A man Rogers at first took to be a rude fan first pitched "Reuben James" to Rogers at a golf match. The man, who turned out to be a song pitcher for American songwriter Alex Harvey, followed him around the greens singing the song until Rogers listened. Rogers loved the song's look at a black man raising a white boy and agreed to record it. "Reuben James" came out at the end of 1969, by which time Mike Settle had been gone for several months. During his absence, he was replaced by Kin Vassy. The group continued to record country, rock, and folk by fairly equal measures, blurring the lines among the genres.

The First Edition reached what was arguably the peak of their fame with "Something's Burning", a No. 11 hit in early 1970. A blatantly sexual song, it was slightly hindered chart-wise by the controversy surrounding it. Regardless, Rogers's soft voice on verses and rock shouting on the chorus earned the group much acclaim. "Burning" opened with a sample of an actual heartbeat played backward to replicate the song's rhythmic beat.

Meanwhile, Williams had begun to record some solo singles. Williams's "I'm Gonna Sing You A Sad Song Susie" was part of the First Edition's next LP Tell It All Brother. The title track (also written by Harvey), which dealt with love and brotherhood, was a national top 20 hit and topped WRKO's August 13, 1970, top 30 survey for one week. Released a month or so after the Kent State shootings, the song drew a standing ovation the night it debuted live.

In addition to the band's continuing frequent appearances on television, songs by Kenny Rogers and the First Edition were featured in two 1970 films. First up was the never released on record "If Nobody Loved" for the camp political comedy Flap. A few months later they recorded "Someone Who Cares" and "A Poem I Wrote For Your Hair" to appear in the soundtrack for the romantic film Fools starring Jason Robards Jr., and Katharine Ross. The Fools soundtrack was released in 1971.

At the end of 1970, the First Edition had their seventh Top 40 hit with the Vassy-penned "Heed the Call". Another song about the need for brotherhood, it was seen as an uptempo counterpart to the balladry of "Tell It All Brother." The next single, "Someone Who Cares", was taken from the Fools movie soundtrack. Though scoring high on the easy listening charts, "Someone Who Cares" failed to reach the pop top fifty. This ushered in a period during which the First Edition attempted to retool its image. Keyboard player John Hobbs was briefly in the lineup, but, though he played on future recordings, was not in the group long enough to appear on any album covers or publicity photos. His brief tenure was captured in the PBS television special Tell It All. The special provided an unusually in-depth look at the group, all of whom were at ease speaking in front of the camera. In mid-1971 the First Edition released a gospel single called "Take My Hand", which barely scraped into the bottom of the charts.

== TV and later releases ==
After the success of a pilot shot in late 1970, the fall of 1971 saw Kenny Rogers and the First Edition become hosts of their own television series Rollin' on the River. Later shortened to Rollin', this was a variety show that was taped in Canada (taking advantage of recently imposed Canadian content requirements) which geared itself toward rock, blues, and folk performers and groups. Unlike the more Las Vegas-styled The Sonny & Cher Comedy Hour, Rollin' was focused on harder-edged guests like Ike and Tina Turner, veterans like Bo Diddley, veteran Canadian based artists such as Ronnie Hawkins, and up and coming performers such as Jim Croce. The show also gave the First Edition a chance to do the comedy Rogers and Williams had long made a part of their act. Though it got good ratings, Rollin' did have one ill side effect: the First Edition were now seen as television personalities instead of recording stars. Williams's signature song, "What Am I Gonna Do", was to become the group's next single in late 1971. It was the first First Edition 45 not to chart since 1968.

Recorded over six months in 1971, and released in March 1972, The Ballad of Calico was written by future star Michael Martin Murphey and the First Edition's musical director and arranger Larry Cansler. Cansler replaced Hobbs on stage during this period, but despite his large creative role here, and on Rollin' on the River, he was not promoted on either as a member of the group. The album was a country rock opera about a late 19th-century mining town, but unlike most like-minded projects of the era, all of the songs were based on fact. The sleeve and booklet of this two-LP set had genuine and period-styled photos depicting the era, with all of the lyrics presented in hand-written script. The music was critically well received, with all of the group (outside of Jones) taking at least one lead. The song chosen for a single was "School Teacher," an acoustic rhythm and blues song with a lead by Vassy. "The Ballad Of Calico" has since picked up a large cult following, but back in 1972 it was all but ignored. According to Jones's book That Would Be Me, Vassy was fired several months after "Calico's" release following a drunken backstage confrontation with Williams.

By early 1972, Gene Lorenzo replaced Larry Cansler on stage and was made a full First Edition member. Jimmy Hassell joined the group about six months later to replace Vassy. Lorenzo was a keyboard and piano virtuoso. Hassell was a hard rock singer similar to Vassy, and physically resembled a friend of Williams's, actor Gary Busey. Both fit in well, without marring the public impression of the original members. Around the same time, Rogers formed his own label, Jolly Rogers (distributed by MGM. Rogers retained the name when he started his own publishing company as a solo artist) and the group left Reprise.

Their first Jolly Rogers release was a late 1972 country LP called Backroads. The third single from the album, a version of Merle Haggard's "Today I Started Loving You Again" reached the lower regions of the country charts in mid-1973. Then came a soundtrack from Rollin'. The album consisted mainly of cover songs, of which Rogers's remake of "The Long and Winding Road" and Lorenzo and Williams's reworking of Bach's "Joy" were most notable. The album did not do well, and the TV show was soon canceled. The group increasingly played on the county fair circuit.

It was decided that a new image far away from their TV persona was required. Monumental tried to give them just this. Combining a wide variety of styles, it ranged from a Rogers-written rocker about prostitute "Morgana Jones" (rerecorded by Rogers for his album The Gambler in 1978) to the nostalgic "42nd Street." The latter compared the New York of 1973 to the Broadway of the 1930s. "The Hoodooin' of Miss Fannie Deberry" (also re-recorded by Rogers for "The Gambler") and "The Ritual", was the LP's centerpiece. Monumental was one of their biggest sales failures in the United States, but in New Zealand it went gold. Following on the local success of Rollin' and the understated ballad "Lady, Play Your Symphony," "Lena Lookie" went to number six, and the group embarked on three New Zealand tours over the next two years. A documentary of their first trip, in late 1973, was aired as a 1975 TV special, Rollin' Through New Zealand.

As their domestic popularity continued to decline, Williams wanted to focus on the hard rockers that had done so well for them overseas. Rogers disagreed, wanting a more conservative agenda. Rogers admitted in his book Making It with Music, that he perhaps should not have complained about MGM's poor distribution on a radio show. Despite their mounting problems, New Zealand continued to consider the First Edition as superstars. Their next album was titled I'm Not Making My Music for Money especially for their New Zealand fans. An LP of this title was to have come out in the US but MGM rejected it. The US LP was basically going to be the same but with two new cuts replacing the two songs reused from "Monumental." Despite the retreads, the album did show continued development. A mix of new songs and remakes (possibly done because some songs were not available in New Zealand), "Love Woman" was now a hard rock jam featuring Hassell on lead. This arrangement was borrowed from the band's stage performances of Bill Haley's "Rockin' Through the Rye". The ballads "Dirty Work" and "Daddy Was a Traveling Man" were a return to the more adult style of Williams's early work. "Making Music for Money" (another song remade for "The Gambler") is a song about art vs. commerce that Jimmy Buffett later covered. It charted well, but again only in New Zealand.

== The split ==
In late 1974, they filmed a television movie called The Dream Makers. It was a drama about the music business and they played the group Catweazel. It was a small role with only Rogers and Jones speaking any major lines. Despite the film giving them a chance to perform recent songs, the exposure did not halt their decline. Rogers had become short on money by 1974, and was in debt when he decided to hawk guitar lesson records on a commercial.

Wanting to give a solo career a shot, Williams left in the late spring of 1975. Rogers was upset but agreed to it, succeeding in getting Vassy to come back so they could fill their pending engagements. Though he was hired to stay permanently, the reunion with Vassy did not go well and he ended up playing only one night. Jones was the first to decide to leave in order to pursue his other dream, which was acting. Rogers began recording as a solo act that fall. The First Edition played their last scheduled shows in the fall of 1975 at Harrah's in Reno. Without Jones, there were a few First Edition gigs in early 1976, done as a favor to Rogers who had not yet formed his solo band. Rogers later said that writing the song "Sweet Music Man" made him cut his hair and let it go gray, plus get rid of the earring. Mary Arnold often sang "Sweet Music Man" on the First Edition's post-Williams gigs and Rogers also tried the lead out a few times. This was to become one of Rogers's most covered compositions, and he himself had a No. 9 country hit with it in late 1977.

== After the split ==
Vassy and Williams fronted a new First Edition in 1993–1994. They continued on a few months after Vassy's death, but they disbanded several months later. It was an attempt at relaunching the group as a contemporary country band who also played their hits. Williams's younger brother Ress played the drums.

In 1980, a compilation of some of the First Edition's greatest hits and album cuts, titled "Shine On", was issued in the United Kingdom. It sold fairly well but was overshadowed by The Kenny Rogers Singles Album, a Kenny Rogers solo greatest hits collection that, in addition to his solo hits, featured reworkings of the group's best known songs.

Currently there are many compilations of their work in print on various labels, some miscredited to Rogers alone with picture not of the period.

"Live Vegas '72" is the first new First Edition music to be released since 1974. The recording was a Vassy-era performance of an unknown date.

The band scored a total of 11 hit singles and eight hit albums on the Billboard charts.

On April 10, 2010, Rogers, Settle, Jones, Williams, Arnold, and Lorenzo reunited as part of the Kenny Rogers: The First 50 Years TV special. This was filmed at the Foxwoods Resort Casino in Connecticut. They were joined by Wynonna Judd on a rendition of "Just Dropped In".

The First Edition semi-reunited with Rogers several times in 2014 and 2015 when he was elected to the Country Music Hall Of Fame. These were brief press conferences and performances only.

== Discography ==
=== Albums ===
| Year | Album | Chart positions | | Certifications |
| Year | Album | US | CAN | Certifications |
|---|---|---|---|---|
| 1967 | The First Edition | 118 | — | |
| 1968 | The First Edition's 2nd | — | — | |
| 1969 | The First Edition '69 | 164 | — | |
| 1969 | Ruby, Don't Take Your Love To Town | 48 | 52 | |
| 1970 | Something's Burning | 26 | 47 | |
| 1970 | Tell It All Brother | 61 | 42 | |
| 1971 | Fools (soundtrack) | — | — | |
| 1971 | Greatest Hits | 57 | 33 | RIAA: Platinum |
| 1971 | Transition | 155 | — | |
| 1972 | The Ballad of Calico | 118 | — | |
| 1972 | Backroads | — | — | |
| 1973 | Rollin' | — | — | |
| 1973 | Monumental | — | — | |
| 1974 | I'm Not Making Music for Money (New Zealand only) | — | — | |
| 2015 | Live Vegas '72 (500 vinyl only) | — | — | |
"—" denotes releases that did not chart or were not released in that territory.

=== Singles ===
| Year | Single | Chart positions | | | | | | | | | Certifications | Album |
| Year | Single | US Cou. | US | US A/C | CAN Cou. | CAN | CAN A/C | NZ | UK | AUS | Certifications | Album |
|---|---|---|---|---|---|---|---|---|---|---|---|---|
| 1967 | "I Found a Reason" | — | — | — | — | — | — | — | — | — | | The First Edition |
| 1967 | "Just Dropped In (To See What Condition My Condition Was In)" | — | 5 | — | — | 3 | — | — | — | — | | The First Edition |
| 1968 | "Only Me" | — | — | — | — | — | — | — | — | — | | The First Edition's 2nd |
| 1968 | "Charlie the Fer De Lance" | — | — | — | — | — | — | — | — | — | | The First Edition's 2nd |
| 1968 | "Are My Thoughts with You?" | — | — | — | — | — | — | — | — | — | | The First Edition's 2nd |
| 1968 | "But You Know I Love You" | — | 19 | 18 | — | 11 | 9 | — | — | — | | The First Edition '69 |
| 1969 | "Once Again, She's All Alone" | — | — | — | — | 86 | — | — | — | — | | Ruby, Don't Take Your Love to Town |
| 1969 | "Ruby, Don't Take Your Love to Town" | 39 | 6 | 6 | 2 | 4 | 1 | 6 | 2 | 9 | BPI: Silver | Ruby, Don't Take Your Love to Town |
| 1969 | "Reuben James" | 46 | 26 | 29 | 12 | 9 | 39 | 9 | — | 10 | | Ruby, Don't Take Your Love to Town |
| 1970 | "Something's Burning" | — | 11 | — | — | 6 | — | 14 | 8 | 13 | | Something's Burning |
| 1970 | "Tell It All Brother" | — | 17 | 8 | — | 10 | — | — | — | 58 | | Tell It All Brother |
| 1970 | "Heed the Call" | — | 33 | 20 | — | 6 | — | — | — | 68 | | Tell It All Brother |
| 1971 | "Someone Who Cares" | — | 51 | 4 | — | 54 | — | — | — | — | | Fools (soundtrack) |
| 1971 | "Take My Hand" | — | 91 | — | — | — | — | — | — | — | | Transition |
| 1971 | "What Am I Gonna Do" | — | — | — | — | — | — | — | — | — | | Transition |
| 1972 | "School Teacher" | — | 91 | — | — | — | — | — | — | — | | Ballad of Calico |
| 1972 | "Lady Play Your Symphony" | — | — | — | — | — | — | 5 | — | — | | Backroads |
| 1973 | "(Do You Remember The) First Time" | — | — | — | — | — | — | — | — | — | | Backroads |
| 1973 | "Today I Started Loving You Again" | 69 | — | — | — | — | — | — | — | — | | Backroads |
| 1973 | "Lena Lookie" | — | — | — | — | — | — | 6 | — | — | | Monumental |
| 1973 | "Something About Your Song" | — | — | — | — | — | — | — | — | — | | Monumental |
| 1974 | "Makin' Music for Money" | — | — | — | — | — | — | 11 | — | — | | I'm Not Making My Music For Money |
"—" denotes releases that did not chart or were not released in that territory.

=== Available on DVD ===
- 2005: Kenny Rogers: Going Home, Live at the House of Blues UK DVD compatible with US format contains a 1994 Disney Channel documentary. Includes a five-minute First Edition segment with rare footage.
- 2005: Remember the 70's 60-minute compilation of Rollin' hosted by Mickey Jones. Two First Edition performances are included as well as their intros for other artists.
- 2006: Kenny Rogers – The Journey with the First Edition Dottie West, Willie Nelson, and Dolly Parton
- 2007: Flashbacks: Pop Parade (includes selections from the View Video Rollin' releases)
- 2007: Flashbacks: Easy Lovin' (includes selections from the View Video Rollin' releases)
- 2007: Kenny Rogers: Rollin' Volume 1 with the First Edition, Ike Turner, Tina Turner, Gladys Knight & the Pips
- 2007: Kenny Rogers: Rollin' Volume 2 with the First Edition, Jim Croce, Bo Diddley, and Ronnie Hawkins

Note: all View Video releases were originally issued on VHS in the early nineties.

Numerous releases with miscellaneous Rollin' footage have come out in Europe and Australia. They are of dubious legality and were all quickly pulled from the market.

== Documentaries ==
- "Tell It All"; airdate: syndicated in fall of 1972. A PBS special filmed in early 1971 during a date in South Carolina. Goes backstage, shows rehearsals, and has in depth interviews with all of the group. Some of this was reused in "Kenny Rogers–The Journey". The rest is yet to be released on home video.
- "Rollin' Through New Zealand"; airdate: syndicated in early 1975. The First Edition star in this look at their visits and success in New Zealand. No official home video released, but producer Tony Williams put it online.
- "Kenny Rogers: A Gambler's Tale"; A&E biography 1999. Rogers and Mike Settle are interviewed for this 60-minute documentary. Was available on VHS.
- "The Life and Times of Kenny Rogers"; CMT 2002. In-depth look at Rogers includes interviews with Rogers, Mickey Jones, and Terry Williams
- "Kenny Rogers–The Journey"; DVD 2006. A performance based documentary, that devotes about a quarter of its two-hour playing time to the First Edition. Includes vintage and new interviews with Rogers, as well as a new one by Jones.
