= Alex Harvey (country musician) =

American musician (1941–2020)

- Born: Thomas Alexander Harvey; March 10, 1941; Haywood County, Tennessee, U.S.
- Died: April 4, 2020 (aged 79)
- Genres: Americana
- Occupation(s): Singer, songwriter, author, actor, radio host
- Labels: Capitol, United Artists, Buddah, Kama Sutra

Thomas Alexander Harvey (March 10, 1941 – April 4, 2020) was an American singer, songwriter, author, actor, and radio host.

== History ==
Alex Harvey was born in rural western Tennessee near Brownsville. In 1964, Harvey graduated from Murray State University in Kentucky with a master's degree in Music and Education, and he also studied acting in Los Angeles.

Alex Harvey performed and recorded as a musician throughout the 1970s and 1980s. Harvey's songs have been recorded by many other significant artists such as Alan Jackson, Cymarron, Three Dog Night, Billy Ray Cyrus, Jimmy Buffett, Anne Murray, Eydie Gormé, Henry Mancini, Peggy Lee, and Sammy Davis Jr. Kenny Rogers alone has recorded eighteen Alex Harvey songs.

Two of Alex Harvey's greatest hits were "Reuben James" (co-written with Barry Etris), recorded by Kenny Rogers, and "Delta Dawn" (co-written with Larry Collins), recorded by Tanya Tucker, Helen Reddy, and Bette Midler. In 1973, Alex Harvey's "Delta Dawn" was nominated for a Grammy in the category of Best Country Song, however, the Grammy was awarded to Kenny O'Dell for writing Charlie Rich's "Behind Closed Doors." "To Make My Life Beautiful" charted in the Netherlands in 1972.

He died on April 4, 2020 at the age of 79 during the first weeks of the COVID-19 pandemic.

== Discography ==
Per the Library of Congress National Union Catalog.

- Alex Harvey (1971)
- Souvenirs (1972)
- True Love (1973)
- Preshus Child (1976)
- Purple Crush (1977)
- No Place But Texas (1986)
- Black and Red (1995)
- Eden (1997)
- Arms of An Angel (2001)
- Luminary (2002)
- Peace (2003)
- The Songwriter (2004)
- Galilee (2005)
- Texas 101 (2015)
- Heart of The Art In Song (2018)
