= Mike Settle =

American singer-songwriter (born 1941)

- Born: March 20, 1941 (age 84); Tulsa, Oklahoma, U.S.
- Occupation(s): Songwriter, journalist, broadcaster, singer

Michael Ward Settle (born March 20, 1941) is an American songwriter, journalist, broadcaster, and singer.

Settle began his musical career as a solo singer and a member of The New Christy Minstrels. His debut solo album Folk Sing Hallelujah (1961) as Mike Settle and the Settlers, received good reviews and the title track "Sing Hallelujah" was covered on singles by several artists in Europe, and a hit song for Judy Collins (1967). His song "Settle Down (Goin' Down That Highway)" was recorded by Peter, Paul and Mary on their 1963 album, Moving and was its second single.

Settle is best known as a member of Kenny Rogers and The First Edition between 1967 and 1970. While he was with the group he composed a number of songs including "But You Know I Love You" (a No. 19 pop hit in 1969), as well as "It's Gonna Be Better", "The Last Few Threads Of Love" and "Goodtime Liberator", among many others. He was later a member of the group Running Bear and Goldstein which recorded the original song "Rings", popularized by Cymarron (1971) and Lobo (1974). He also contributed three songs to the soundtrack of the 1971 cult classic movie Vanishing Point.

In 1971, Settle sang lead on a song which was distributed as a cardboard cut-out record (version #2) attached to the back of hundreds of thousands Post Sugar Crisp cereal boxes: "You Are The One" by the Sugar Bears, a studio project involving Settle, producer Jimmy Bowen, Kim Carnes, Baker Knight, and others. An album, Presenting the Sugar Bears, and three singles were released on Big Tree Records, with "You Are The One" eventually peaking at No. 51 on the Billboard pop chart in April 1972.

Settle was credited over the years variously as a producer, arranger, vocalist, and musician on albums by Kim Carnes, John Stewart, Glenn Yarbrough, and the Kingston Trio.

== Discography ==
- Folk Sing Hallelujah (1961) (as Mike Settle and the Settlers, Folk Sing FLP 10001)
- Pastures Of Plenty (1963) (Folk Sing FLS-31002)
- The Mike Settle Shindig (1965) (as The Mike Settle Shindig, Reprise RS-6149)
- Mike Settle (1971) (UNI 73123)
- Seven by Mike Settle/Eight by Dick Weissman (197?) (The Richmond Organization 12-01, publisher's promo album)

== External resources ==
- Mike Settle at AllMusic.com
- Mike Settle discography at Discogs
- Discography at Prague Frank's Country Music Discographies
- Label scans at www.45cat.com
- Mike Settle at IMDb
