= Kenny Rogers discography =

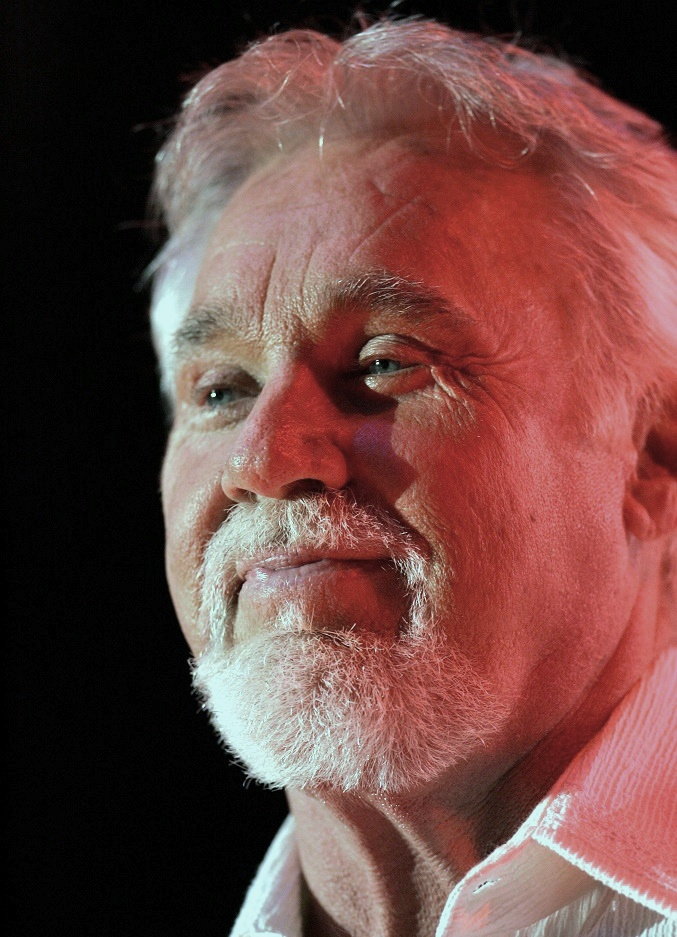
- Studio albums: 39
- Compilation albums: 43
- Singles: 80
- Music videos: 27
- No. 1 singles (overall): 30
- No. 1 singles (US): 24

The discography of American singer Kenny Rogers (1938–2020), consists of 39 studio albums and 80 singles, 24 of which have reached Number One on the country chart. His longest-lasting Number Ones on that chart are "The Gambler" and "Coward of the County", at three weeks each. Two of his Number One country hits, "Lady" and "Islands in the Stream", a duet with Dolly Parton, also reached Number One on the Billboard Hot 100; "Lady" spent six weeks at the top, making it his longest running Number One single on any Billboard chart. More than just a US phenomenon, he found an audience around the world with two of his biggest songs, "Lucille" and "Coward of the County", both reaching Number One on the general sales chart in the UK. His albums The Gambler and Kenny each topped the country chart for at least 20 weeks, while his Greatest Hits was the only album by a solo country performer to top the Billboard 200 during the 1980s, reaching the summit in late 1980.

== Studio albums ==
=== 1970s ===
Title	Details	Peak chart positions							Certifications (sales thresholds)
Title	Details	US Country	US	AUS	CAN Country	CAN	UK	NZ	Certifications (sales thresholds)
Love Lifted Me	Released: May 31, 1976; Label: United Artists	28	—	—	—	—	—	—	
Kenny Rogers	Released: October 18, 1976; Label: United Artists	1	30	61	—	17	14	5	RIAA: Platinum; MC: Gold
Daytime Friends	Released: July 25, 1977; Label: United Artists	2	39	—	—	41	—	—	RIAA: Platinum; MC: Gold
Every Time Two Fools Collide (with Dottie West)	Released: March 20, 1978; Label: United Artists	1	186	—	—	95	—	—	RIAA: Gold
Love or Something Like It	Released: July 3, 1978; Label: United Artists	1	53	—	2	47	—	—	RIAA: Gold; MC: Gold
The Gambler	Released: November 20, 1978; Label: United Artists	1	12	21	1	6	—	—	RIAA: 5× Platinum; MC: 4× Platinum
Classics (with Dottie West)	Released: March 19, 1979; Label: United Artists	3	82	—	—	60	—	—	RIAA: Platinum
Kenny	Released: September 10, 1979; Label: United Artists	1	5	15	1	1	7	15	RIAA: 3× Platinum; ARIA: Platinum; MC: 4× Platinum
"—" denotes releases that did not chart

=== 1980s ===
Title	Details	Peak chart positions							Certifications (sales thresholds)
Title	Details	US Country	US	AUS	CAN Country	CAN	UK	NZ	Certifications (sales thresholds)
Gideon	Released: March 24, 1980; Label: United Artists	1	12	31	1	5	—	48	RIAA: Platinum; MC: 2× Platinum
Share Your Love	Released: June 15, 1981; Label: Liberty	1	6	44	—	11	—	—	RIAA: Platinum; MC: 2× Platinum
Christmas	Released: October 26, 1981; Label: Liberty	10	34	—	—	—	—	—	RIAA: 2× Platinum; MC: Platinum
Love Will Turn You Around	Released: June 28, 1982; Label: Liberty	5	34	84	—	23	—	—	RIAA: Platinum; MC: Platinum
We've Got Tonight	Released: February 11, 1983; Label: Liberty	3	18	49	—	19	—	—	RIAA: Platinum; MC: Platinum
Eyes That See in the Dark	Released: August 22, 1983; Label: RCA	1	6	6	—	5	53	2	RIAA: 2× Platinum; MC: 3× Platinum
What About Me?	Released: August 27, 1984; Label: RCA	9	31	30	—	26	97	23	RIAA: Platinum; MC: Platinum
Once Upon a Christmas (with Dolly Parton)	Released: November 5, 1984; Label: RCA	12	31	—	—	31	—	—	RIAA: 2× Platinum; MC: 5× Platinum
The Heart of the Matter	Released: September 16, 1985; Label: RCA	1	51	69	—	57	—	—	RIAA: Gold; MC: Gold
They Don't Make Them Like They Used To	Released: November 3, 1986; Label: RCA	16	137	60	—	81	—	20	
I Prefer the Moonlight	Released: August 3, 1987; Label: RCA	18	163	—	—	—	—	—	
Something Inside So Strong	Released: May 2, 1989; Label: Reprise	10	141	133	13	92	—	—	RIAA: Gold
Christmas in America	Released: August 15, 1989; Label: Reprise	45	119	—	—	—	—	—	RIAA: Gold
"—" denotes releases that did not chart

=== 1990s ===
Title	Details	Peak chart positions				Certifications (sales thresholds)
Title	Details	US Country	US	AUS	CAN Country	Certifications (sales thresholds)
Love Is Strange	Released: September 11, 1990; Label: Reprise	21	—	155	—	
Back Home Again	Released: November 26, 1991; Label: Reprise	42	—	—	32	
If Only My Heart Had a Voice	Released: April 13, 1993; Label: Giant	—	—	—	—	
Timepiece (with David Foster)	Released: October 4, 1994; Label: 143/Atlantic	—	—	165	—	
Vote for Love	Released: January 2, 1996; Label: QVC	—	—	—	—	
The Gift	Released: August 20, 1996; Label: Magnatone	10	63	—	—	RIAA: Gold
Across My Heart	Released: July 15, 1997; Label: Magnatone	26	193	89	—	
Christmas from the Heart	Released: October 6, 1998; Label: Dreamcatcher	—	164	—	—	
She Rides Wild Horses	Released: May 11, 1999; Label: Dreamcatcher	6	60	—	8	RIAA: Platinum
"—" denotes releases that did not chart

=== 2000s–2020s ===
Title	Details	Peak chart positions				
Title	Details	US Country	US	US Christ	AUS	UK
There You Go Again	Released: October 3, 2000; Label: Dreamcatcher	17	121	—	—	—
Back to the Well	Released: September 23, 2003; Label: Dreamcatcher	52	—	—	179	100
Water & Bridges	Released: March 21, 2006; Label: Capitol Nashville	5	14	—	—	—
The Love of God	Released: March 7, 2011; Label: Cracker Barrel	7	27	2	—	—
You Can't Make Old Friends	Released: October 8, 2013; Label: Warner Bros. Nashville	9	43	—	—	—
Once Again It's Christmas	Released: September 25, 2015; Label: Warner Bros.	17	197	—	—	—
Life Is Like a Song	Released: June 2, 2023; Label: UMe	—	—	—	—	—
"—" denotes releases that did not chart

== Live albums ==
Title	Details	Peak chart positions
Title	Details	US Country
Christmas Live!	Released: September 25, 2012; Label: Gaither Music Group	68
All In for the Gambler 2022	Recording of the farewell concert	

== Compilations ==
=== 1970s ===
Title	Details	Peak chart positions					Certifications (sales thresholds)
Title	Details	US Country	US	AUS	CAN	UK	Certifications (sales thresholds)
Ten Years of Gold	Released: January 1978; Label: United Artists	1	33	68	23	—	RIAA: 4× Platinum; MC: Platinum
The Kenny Rogers Singles Album The Best of Kenny Rogers	Released: 1979; Label: United Artists	—	—	4	—	12	ARIA: Platinum
"—" denotes releases that did not chart

=== 1980s ===
Title	Details	Peak chart positions						Certifications (sales thresholds)
Title	Details	US Country	US	AUS	CAN Country	CAN	UK	Certifications (sales thresholds)
Greatest Hits / Lady (UK version)	Released: September 23, 1980; Label: Liberty	1	1	—	2	3	40	RIAA: Diamond (12× Platinum); MC: Diamond
The Best of Kenny Rogers Vol. 2	Released: 1980 (Australia); Label: Liberty	—	—	10	—	—	—	ARIA: Platinum
20 Greatest Hits	Released: 1983; Label: Liberty	16	22	2	—	29	—	RIAA: 4× Platinum; MC: 2× Platinum
HBO Presents: Kenny Rogers Greatest Hits	Released: 1983; Label: HBO	—	—	—	—	—	—	
Duets	Released: 1984; Label: Liberty	43	85	11	—	64	—	RIAA: Platinum; MC: Gold
The Kenny Rogers Story^{A}	Released: 1985; Label: Liberty	—	—	—	—	—	4	
Love Is What We Make It	Released: 1985; Label: Liberty	17	145	—	—	—	—	RIAA: Gold
His Greatest Hits and Finest Performances	Released: 1985; Label: Reader's Digest	—	—	—	—	—	—	
Short Stories	Released: November 15, 1985; Label: EMI America	—	—	—	—	—	—	
25 Greatest Hits	Released: 1987; Label: EMI America	—	—	—	—	—	—	
Greatest Hits	Released: 1988; Label: RCA	66	—	—	—	—	—	RIAA: Gold
Lucille and Other Classics	Released: 1989; Label: EMI Special Products	—	—	—	—	—	—	
"—" denotes releases that did not chart; ^{A} denotes European release only.

=== 1990s ===
Title	Details	Peak chart positions					Certifications (sales thresholds)
Title	Details	US Country	US	AUS	CAN Country	UK	Certifications (sales thresholds)
20 Great Years	Released: 1990; Label: Reprise	—	—	—	—	—	RIAA: Platinum
Greatest Country Hits	Released: 1990; Label: Curb	—	—	—	—	—	
Kenny Rogers & Dolly Parton (with Dolly Parton)	Released: August 1990; Label:	—	—	80	—	—	
The Very Best of Kenny Rogers	Released: 1990; Label: Reprise	—	—	116	—	—	
The Best of Kenny Rogers	Released: 1992; Label: CEMA	—	—	—	—	—	
Daytime Friends – The Very Best of Kenny Rogers	Released: September 13, 1993; Label: EMI Classics	25	190	—	—	16	ARIA: Gold
Every Time Two Fools Collide – The Best of Kenny Rogers and Dottie West	Released: 1993; Label: EMI/Capitol	—	—	—	—	—	
Endless Love	Released: August 1996; Label:	—	—	17	—	—	
A Decade of Hits	Released: March 25, 1997; Label: Warner Bros.	—	—	—	—	—	
Love Songs	Released: November 1997; Label: Virgin	—	—	—	—	27	
The Ultimate Collection	Released: May 1998; Label:	—	—	85	—	—	
With Love	Released: December 1, 1998; Label: Madacy Entertainment	—	119	—	—	—	IFPI NOR: Platinum
A&E Biography	Released: January 26, 1999; Label: Capitol	69	—	—	3	—	
Through the Years: A Retrospective	Released: January 26, 1999; Label: Capitol; 4-CD box set	—	—	—	—	—	
All the Hits & All New Love Songs	Released: May 1999; Label: EMI; 2-CD set	—	—	10	—	6	
After Dark	Released: 1999; Label: Sony, Dreamcatcher	—	—	77	—	—	
"—" denotes releases that did not chart

=== 2000s ===
Title	Details	Peak chart positions				Certifications (sales thresholds)
Title	Details	US Country	US	AUS	UK	Certifications (sales thresholds)
Kenny Rogers Collection	Released: 2000; Label: Madacy Entertainment	—	—	—	—	
Best Inspirational Songs	Released: May 15, 2001; Label: Curb	—	—	—	—	
Songs of Love	Released: 2001; Label: onQ	74	—	—	—	
Kenny Rogers	Released: June 26, 2001; Label: Laserlight	72	—	—	—	
Live by Request	Released: October 23, 2001; Label: Dreamcatcher	68	—	—	—	
Love Songs	Released: 2002; Label: onQ	63	—	—	—	
The Definitive Collection	Released: March 7, 2003; Label: EMI	—	—	—	—	
Kenny Rogers Love Songs	Released: April 6, 2004; Label: Madacy Entertainment	53	—	—	—	
42 Ultimate Hits	Released: June 1, 2004; Label: Capitol Nashville	6	39	—	—	RIAA: Gold
Christmas with Kenny	Released: September 14, 2004; Label: Rio Creek	74	—	—	—	
Golden Legends: Kenny Rogers	Released: 2005; Label: Madacy Entertainment	57	—	—	—	
21 Number Ones	Released: January 24, 2006; Label: Capitol Nashville	6	24	38	—	RIAA: Gold; ARIA: Platinum
Kenny Rogers	Released: July 25, 2006; Label: Madacy Entertainment	38	—	—	—	
Christmas Collection	Released: August 15, 2006; Label: EMI	57	—	—	—	
A Love Song Collection	Released: January 15, 2008; Label: Capitol Nashville	53	—	—	47	
50 Years	Released: August 26, 2008; Label: Cracker Barrel	—	—	—	—	
The Best Of	3-CD set; Released: March 2009; Label: EMI Gold	—	—	50	—	
The First 50 Years	Released: October 20, 2009; Label: Time–Life	—	—	—	—	
"—" denotes releases that did not chart

=== 2010s ===
Title	Details	Peak chart positions				Sales
Title	Details	US Country	US	US Christ	CAN	Sales
10 Great Songs	Released: January 12, 2010; Label: Capitol Nashville	58	—	—	—	
Kenny Rogers	Released: September 28, 2010; Label: Sonoma Entertainment	61	—	—	—	
The Best of Kenny Rogers	Released: September 28, 2010; Label: Sonoma Entertainment	40	—	—	—	
Amazing Grace	Released: October 9, 2012; Label: Gaither Music Group	32	—	15	—	
10 Great Songs: 20th Century Masters: The Millennium Collection	Released: April 1, 2014; Label: Universal Music Group	43	—	—	—	
The Best of Kenny Rogers: Through the Years	Released: September 21, 2018; Label: Capitol Nashville	1	9	—	12	US: 10,000
"—" denotes releases that did not chart

== Singles ==
=== 1950s–1970s ===
Year	Single	US charts			CAN charts			International charts				Certifications	Album
Year	Single	Hot 100	Adult	Country	Singles	Adult	Country	AUS	NED	NZ	UK	Certifications	Album
1958	"That Crazy Feeling"	—	—	—	—	—	—	—	—	—	—		—N/a
1958	"For You Alone"	—	—	—	—	—	—	—	—	—	—		—N/a
1958	"Jole Blon"	—	—	—	—	—	—	—	—	—	—		—N/a
1966	"Here's That Rainy Day"	—	—	—	—	—	—	—	—	—	—		—N/a
1975	"Love Lifted Me"	97	—	19	—	—	25	99	—	—	—		Love Lifted Me
1976	"While the Feeling's Good"	—	—	46	—	—	—	—	—	—	—		Love Lifted Me
1976	"Laura (What's He Got That I Ain't Got)"	—	—	19	—	—	39	—	—	—	—		Kenny Rogers
1977	"Lucille"	5	10	1	1	1	1	7	17	2	1	RIAA: Gold; BPI: Silver; RMNZ: Gold	Kenny Rogers
1977	"Daytime Friends"	28	13	1	21	1	1	69	—	16	39		Daytime Friends
1977	"Sweet Music Man"	44	29	9	45	1	1	89	—	—	—		Daytime Friends
1978	"Love or Something Like It"	32	12	1	36	3	1	—	—	—	—		Love or Something Like It
1978	"The Gambler"	16	3	1	8	6	2	25	—	29	22	BPI: 2× Platinum; RMNZ: 7× Platinum	The Gambler
1979	"She Believes in Me"	5	1	1	8	1	1	34	39	—	42	RIAA: Gold	The Gambler
1979	"You Decorated My Life"	7	2	1	12	1	1	61	—	36	—		Kenny
1979	"Coward of the County"	3	5	1	1	1	1	6	8	3	1	RIAA: Gold; BPI: Gold; RMNZ: Platinum	Kenny
"—" denotes releases that did not chart

=== 1980s ===
Year	Single	US charts			CAN charts			International charts				Certifications	Album
Year	Single	Hot 100	Adult	Country	Singles	Adult	Country	AUS	NED	NZ	UK	Certifications	Album
1980	"Don't Fall in Love with a Dreamer" (with Kim Carnes)	4	2	3	3	1	1	38	—	31	—		Gideon
1980	"Love the World Away"	14	8	4	25	—	1	—	—	—	—		Urban Cowboy (soundtrack)
1980	"Lady"	1	1	1	2	6	2	16	24	6	12	RIAA: Gold; BPI: Silver	Greatest Hits / Lady
1981	"I Don't Need You"	3	1	1	16	2	1	64	—	38	—		Share Your Love
1981	"Share Your Love with Me"	14	1	5	—	5	2	—	—	—	—		Share Your Love
1981	"Blaze of Glory"	66	25	9	—	—	4	91	—	—	—		Share Your Love
1982	"Through the Years"	13	1	5	—	—	5	92	—	—	—		Share Your Love
1982	"Love Will Turn You Around"	13	1	1	12	1	1	96	—	—	—		Love Will Turn You Around
1982	"A Love Song"	47	10	3	—	7	1	—	—	—	—		Love Will Turn You Around
1983	"We've Got Tonight" (with Sheena Easton)	6	2	1	4	1	1	11	24	13	28	RMNZ: Gold	We've Got Tonight
1983	"All My Life"	37	2	13	—	—	3	—	—	—	—		We've Got Tonight
1983	"Scarlet Fever"	94	—	5	—	—	4	—	—	—	—		We've Got Tonight
1983	"Islands in the Stream" (with Dolly Parton)	1	1	1	1	1	1	1	5	2	7	RIAA: 3× Platinum; ARIA: Platinum; BPI: 3× Platinum; RMNZ: 7× Platinum	Eyes That See in the Dark
1984	"This Woman"	23	2	—	47	1	—	86	—	49	—		Eyes That See in the Dark
1984	"Buried Treasure"	—	—	3	—	—	2	—	—	—	—		Eyes That See in the Dark
1984	"Eyes That See in the Dark"	79	4	30	—	—	—	—	42	—	61		Eyes That See in the Dark
1984	"Evening Star"	—	—	11	—	—	14	—	—	—	—		Eyes That See in the Dark
1984	"What About Me?" (with Kim Carnes and James Ingram)	15	1	70	18	1	25	49	—	25	92		What About Me?
1984	"Crazy"	79	5	1	—	1	1	56	—	—	—		What About Me?
1985	"Morning Desire"	72	8	1	—	3	1	—	—	—	—		The Heart of the Matter
1986	"Tomb of the Unknown Love"	—	—	1	—	—	1	—	—	—	—		The Heart of the Matter
1986	"The Pride Is Back" (with Nickie Ryder)	—	30	46	—	—	35	—	—	—	—		—N/a
1986	"They Don't Make Them Like They Used To"	—	10	53	—	—	23	—	—	—	—		They Don't Make Them Like They Used To
1987	"Twenty Years Ago"	—	15	2	—	6	2	—	45	—	—		They Don't Make Them Like They Used To
1987	"Make No Mistake, She's Mine" (with Ronnie Milsap)	—	42	1	—	—	1	—	—	—	—		I Prefer the Moonlight
1987	"I Prefer the Moonlight"	—	—	2	—	—	2	—	—	—	—		I Prefer the Moonlight
1988	"The Factory"	—	—	6	—	—	3	—	—	—	—		I Prefer the Moonlight
1988	"When You Put Your Heart in It"	—	17	26	68	—	16	—	—	—	—		Something Inside So Strong
1989	"Planet Texas"	—	—	30	—	—	11	129	—	—	—		Something Inside So Strong
1989	"(Something Inside) So Strong"	—	26	—	—	—	—	—	—	—	—		Something Inside So Strong
1989	"The Vows Go Unbroken (Always True to You)"	—	—	8	—	—	26	—	—	—	—		Something Inside So Strong
"—" denotes releases that did not chart

=== 1990s ===
Year	Single	Chart positions				Album
Year	Single	US	US Adult	US Country	CAN Country	Album
1990	"Maybe" (with Holly Dunn)	—	—	25	17	Something Inside So Strong
1990	"Love Is Strange" (with Dolly Parton)	—	—	21	14	Love Is Strange
1991	"Lay My Body Down"	—	—	69	—	Love Is Strange
1991	"Walk Away"	—	43	—	—	Love Is Strange
1991	"What I Did for Love"	—	—	—	81	Love Is Strange
1991	"If You Want to Find Love"	—	—	11	12	Back Home Again
1992	"Someone Must Feel Like a Fool Tonight"	—	—	—	—	Back Home Again
1992	"I'll Be There for You"	—	42	—	—	Back Home Again
1993	"Missing You"	—	—	—	—	If Only My Heart Had a Voice
1993	"Ol' Red"	—	—	—	—	If Only My Heart Had a Voice
1997	"Sing Me Your Love Song"	—	—	—	—	Across My Heart
1999	"The Greatest"	—	—	26	18	She Rides Wild Horses
1999	"Slow Dance More"	—	—	67	—	She Rides Wild Horses
1999	"Buy Me a Rose" (with Alison Krauss and Billy Dean)	40	—	1	9	She Rides Wild Horses
"—" denotes releases that did not chart

=== 2000–2020 ===
Title	Year	Chart positions		Album
Title	Year	US	US Country	Album
"He Will, She Knows" (Note: "He Will, She Knows" peaked at number 49 on the RPM Country Tracks chart in Canada.)	2000	—	32	There You Go Again
"There You Go Again"	2001	—	26	There You Go Again
"Beautiful (All That You Could Be)"	2001	—	47	There You Go Again
"Homeland"	2001	—	39	There You Go Again
"Harder Cards"	2002	—	47	Back to the Well
"I'm Missing You"	2003	—	49	Back to the Well
"Love Like This" (featuring Alison Krauss)	2003	—	—	Back to the Well
"Handprints on the Wall"	2003	—	40	Back to the Well
"My World Is Over" (with Whitney Duncan)	2004	—	60	42 Ultimate Hits
"I Can't Unlove You"	2005	93	17	Water & Bridges
"The Last Ten Years (Superman)"	2006	—		Water & Bridges
"Calling Me" (featuring Don Henley)	2007	—	53	Water & Bridges
"Tell Me That You Love Me" (with Dolly Parton)	2009	—	—	The First 50 Years
"You Can't Make Old Friends" (duet with Dolly Parton)	2013	—	— (Note: "You Can't Make Old Friends" did not chart on Hot Country Songs, but peaked at number 57 on Country Airplay.)	You Can't Make Old Friends
"Goodbye"	2020	—	—	The First 50 Years
"—" denotes releases that did not chart

== Other singles ==
=== Charted B-sides ===
Year	Single	US charts		CAN charts			Original A-side
Year	Single	Adult	Country	Singles	Adult	Country	Original A-side
1984	"Midsummer Nights"	—	flip	—	24	41	"Evening Star"
1990	"If I Knew Then What I Know Now" (with Gladys Knight)	10	—	—	33	—	"Maybe"
1990	"Crazy in Love"	9	—	77	9	—	"Lay My Body Down"
"—" denotes releases that did not chart

=== Collaborations ===
Year	Single	US charts			CAN charts		International charts		Album
Year	Single	Hot 100	Adult	Country	Adult	Country	NED	NZ	Album
1978	"Every Time Two Fools Collide" (with Dottie West)	101	44	1	12	1	—	—	Every Time Two Fools Collide
1978	"Anyone Who Isn't Me Tonight" (with Dottie West)	—	—	2	—	10	—	—	Every Time Two Fools Collide
1979	"All I Ever Need Is You" (with Dottie West)	102	38	1	—	2	—	37	Classics
1979	"'Til I Can Make It on My Own" (with Dottie West)	—	—	3	—	1	—	—	Classics
1984	"Christmas Without You" (with Dolly Parton)	—	—	—	—	—	28	—	Once Upon a Christmas
1984	"The Greatest Gift of All" (with Dolly Parton)	81	40	53	—	—	—	—	Once Upon a Christmas
1994	"You Are So Beautiful" (with David Foster)	—	—	—	—	—	—	—	Timepiece
"—" denotes releases that did not chart

=== Guest singles ===
Year	Single	Artist	Peak chart positions							Album
Year	Single	Artist	US Country	US	US AC	AUS	CAN Country	CAN	CAN Adult	Album
1981	"What Are We Doin' in Love"	Dottie West	1	14	7	—	3	—	9	Wild West
1985	"We Are the World"	USA for Africa	76	1	—	1	—	1	1	We Are the World
1985	"Real Love"	Dolly Parton	1	91	13	45	1	—	19	Real Love
1989	"If I Ever Fall in Love Again"	Anne Murray	26	—	—	—	9	—	6	Greatest Hits Volume II
1991	"Voices That Care"	Various artists	—	11	6	—	—	—	—	—N/a
2001	"America the Beautiful"	Various artists	58	—	—	—	—	—	—	—N/a
"—" denotes releases that did not chart

=== Promotional singles ===
Year	Single	Peak positions			Album
Year	Single	US AC	US Country	CAN Country	Album
1981	"Kentucky Home Made Christmas"	—	—	—	Christmas
1983	"You Were a Good Friend"	—	20	27	20 Greatest Hits
1984	"Together Again" (with Dottie West)	—	19	29	Duets
1985	"Love Is What We Make It"	35	37	—	Love Is What We Make It
1985	"Twentieth Century Fool"	—	57	—	Love Is What We Make It
1986	"Goodbye Marie"	—	47	—	Short Stories
1988	"I Don't Call Him Daddy"	—	86	—	I Prefer the Moonlight
1997	"Mary, Did You Know?" (with Wynonna Judd)	—	55	—	The Gift
2015	"Here It Is Christmas / Baby, It's Cold Outside" (with Jennifer Nettles)	18	—	—	Once Again It's Christmas
"—" denotes releases that did not chart

== Music videos ==
Year	Title	Director
1978	"The Gambler"	
1983	"We've Got Tonight" (with Sheena Easton)	
1983	"This Woman"	Jay Dubin
1984	"A Christmas to Remember" (with Dolly Parton)	Kenny Ortega
1984	"Christmas Without You" (with Dolly Parton)	Kenny Ortega
1985	"Crazy" (Live)	Jeff Margolis
1985	"Morning Desire"	David Hogan
1987	"Twenty Years Ago"	David Hogan
1988	"When You Put Your Heart in It"	Charley Randazzo
1989	"Planet Texas"	Julien Temple
1989	"The Vows Go Unbroken (Always True to You)"	Mac Bennett
1990	"Love is Strange" (with Dolly Parton)	Gerry Wenner
1990	"Lay My Body Down"	
1991	"Voices That Care"	David S. Jackson
1993	"Wanderin' Man"	
1996	"Mary, Did You Know" (with Wynonna Judd)	Kelly Junkerman
1999	"The Greatest"	Shaun Silva
1999	"Slow Dance More"	Shaun Silva
2000	"Buy Me a Rose"	Dave Cass, Sr.
2000	"He Will, She Knows"	William Pay
2001	"There You Go Again"	Shaun Silva
2001	"America the Beautiful"	Marc Ball
2001	"Homeland"	
2004	"My World Is Over" (with Whitney Duncan)	Shaun Silva
2006	"I Can't Unlove You"	Peter Zavadil
2006	"The Last Ten Years (Superman)"	Peter Zavadil
2013	"You Can't Make Old Friends" (with Dolly Parton)	Trey Fanjoy

== See also ==
- Kenny Rogers and The First Edition, for a discography as a member of Kenny Rogers and The First Edition.
