= 1989 in country music =

This is a list of notable events in country music that took place in the year 1989.

== Events ==
- May 9 – Rising country star Keith Whitley is found dead at his home, a victim of alcohol poisoning. News of his death sent shockwaves through the industry, given that he had been hailed as a future superstar who helped bring neotraditionalism to the forefront during the 1980s. His widow, Lorrie Morgan, would become a major superstar after his death.
- October 28- Bill Monroe celebrates his 50th Grand Ole opry anniversary

=== No dates ===
- 1989 was one of two years during the 1980s which sprouted the most prolific class of newcomers in country music history (1986 being the other), a trend that had not been seen since the mid-1950s (when artists such as Elvis Presley, George Jones and Johnny Cash first rose to fame). Clint Black was at the head of the class early on, given that he had two of the year's most memorable singles – "A Better Man" and "Killin' Time" – and one of the most critically acclaimed albums of the year (Killin' Time), and was already selling out shows nationwide. Garth Brooks, however, proved to be the 1989 newcomer that stood head and shoulders above everyone else, eventually selling millions of albums, taking worldwide tours and creating some of the most influential music of the 1990s and beyond. Another newcomer, Alan Jackson, had a minor hit with his first release in the autumn of that year with "Blue Blooded Woman;" future singles – all featuring the neotraditional style, would do considerably better, to say the least. Travis Tritt contributed with his brand of rock-influenced country, while Lorrie Morgan (daughter of Grand Ole Opry legend George Morgan) became a star in her own right following the alcohol-poisoning death of her husband, Keith Whitley.

Other top newcomers of the year were Suzy Bogguss, and Lionel Cartwright.

== Top hits of the year ==
=== Singles released by American artists ===
US	CAN	Single	Artist
18	14	5:01 Blues	Merle Haggard
1	1	Above and Beyond	Rodney Crowell
1	1	Ace in the Hole	George Strait
1	1	After All This Time	Rodney Crowell
5	10	All the Fun	Paul Overstreet
5	2	All the Reasons Why	Highway 101
4	32	An American Family	The Oak Ridge Boys
14	29	And So It Goes	John Denver/The Nitty Gritty Dirt Band
4	5	Any Way the Wind Blows	Southern Pacific
1	6	Are You Ever Gonna Love Me	Holly Dunn
1	1	Baby's Gotten Good at Goodbye	George Strait
20	24	Back in the Fire	Gene Watson
1	1	Bayou Boys	Eddy Raven
4	10	A Better Love Next Time	Merle Haggard
1	1	A Better Man	Clint Black
7	10	Beyond Those Years	The Oak Ridge Boys
3	5	Big Dreams in a Small Town	Restless Heart
5	8	Big Love	The Bellamy Brothers
1	1	Big Wheels in the Moonlight	Dan Seals
4	7	Blue Side of Town	Patty Loveless
13	21	Borderline	The Shooters
15	42	Breaking New Ground	Wild Rose
10	10	Bridges and Walls	The Oak Ridge Boys
3	5	Burnin' a Hole in My Heart	Skip Ewing
1	4	Burnin' Old Memories	Kathy Mattea
4	5	Call on Me	Tanya Tucker
1	1	Cathy's Clown	Reba McEntire
1	1	Change of Heart	The Judds
1	1	The Church on Cumberland Road	Shenandoah
15	24	The Coast of Colorado	Skip Ewing
7	5	Come as You Were	T. Graham Brown
1	1	Come from the Heart	Kathy Mattea
9	22	Country Club	Travis Tritt
14	17	Cross My Broken Heart	Suzy Bogguss
9	12	Dear Me	Lorrie Morgan
1	1	Deeper Than the Holler	Randy Travis
5	5	Don't Toss Us Away	Patty Loveless
5	6	Don't Waste It on the Blues	Gene Watson
9	15	Don't You	The Forester Sisters
1	2	Don't You Ever Get Tired (Of Hurting Me)	Ronnie Milsap
6	7	Down That Road Tonight	Nitty Gritty Dirt Band
14	14	Early in the Morning and Late at Night	Hank Williams Jr.
5	5	Fair Shake	Foster & Lloyd
6	5	Finders Are Keepers	Hank Williams Jr.
1	1	From a Jack to a King	Ricky Van Shelton
3	2	From the Word Go	Michael Martin Murphey
3	7	Give Me His Last Chance	Lionel Cartwright
10	11	The Gospel According to Luke	Skip Ewing
13	25	The Heart	Lacy J. Dalton
8	3	Heartbreak Hill	Emmylou Harris
16	16	Heaven Only Knows	Emmylou Harris
11	11	Hello Trouble	The Desert Rose Band
2	1	Hey Bobby	K. T. Oslin
1	1	High Cotton	Alabama
2	1	Highway Robbery	Tanya Tucker
1	1	Hold Me	K. T. Oslin
6	4	Hold On (A Little Longer)	Steve Wariner
4	1	Hole in My Pocket	Ricky Van Shelton
5	3	Honey I Dare You	Southern Pacific
6	5	Honky Tonk Heart	Highway 101
19	28	House on Old Lonesome Road	Conway Twitty
4	12	Houston Solution	Ronnie Milsap
19	44	How Do	Mary Chapin Carpenter
1	1	I Don't Want to Spoil the Party	Rosanne Cash
9	12	I Feel Fine	Sweethearts of the Rodeo
1	3	I Got Dreams	Steve Wariner
5	5	I Got You	Dwight Yoakam
16	37	I Just Called to Say Goodbye Again	Larry Boone
21	12	I Know What I've Got	J.C. Crowley
1	1	I Sang Dixie	Dwight Yoakam
1	1	I Still Believe in You	The Desert Rose Band
4	4	I Wish I Was Still in Your Dreams	Conway Twitty
1	1	I Wonder Do You Think of Me	Keith Whitley
16	19	I'll Be Lovin' You	Lee Greenwood
5	5	(I'm A) One Woman Man	George Jones
1	1	I'm No Stranger to the Rain	Keith Whitley
1	1	I'm Still Crazy	Vern Gosdin
4	11	I've Been Loved by the Best	Don Williams
17	21	If I Ever Go Crazy	The Shooters
1	1	If I Had You	Alabama
1	2	If Tomorrow Never Comes	Garth Brooks
1	1	In a Letter to You	Eddy Raven
1	1	Is It Still Over?	Randy Travis
11	13	(It's Always Gonna Be) Someday	Holly Dunn
1	1	It's Just a Matter of Time	Randy Travis
1	1	Killin' Time	Clint Black
5	3	Let It Be You	Ricky Skaggs
1	1	Let Me Tell You About Love	The Judds
12	24	Let's Get Started If We're Gonna Break My Heart	The Statler Brothers
4	9	Life as We Knew It	Kathy Mattea
14	21	Like Father Like Son	Lionel Cartwright
1	1	Living Proof	Ricky Van Shelton
6	5	The Lonely Side of Love	Patty Loveless
5	3	Long Shot	Baillie & the Boys
4	3	Love Has No Right	Billy Joe Royal
1	2	Love Out Loud	Earl Thomas Conley
7	20	Love Will	The Forester Sisters
1	1	Lovin' Only Me	Ricky Skaggs
6	13	More Than a Name on a Wall	The Statler Brothers
8	9	Much Too Young (To Feel This Damn Old)	Garth Brooks
19	15	My Train of Thought	Barbara Mandrell
9	21	Never Givin' Up on Love	Michael Martin Murphey
8	6	Never Had It So Good	Mary Chapin Carpenter
1	1	New Fool at an Old Game	Reba McEntire
1	1	Nothing I Can Do About It Now	Willie Nelson
5	2	Old Coyote Town	Don Williams
4	3	One Good Well	Don Williams
2	3	Out of Your Shoes	Lorrie Morgan
13	8	Paint the Town and Hang the Moon Tonight	J. C. Crowley
30	11	Planet Texas	Kenny Rogers
17	12	Promises	Randy Travis
5	3	The Race Is On	Sawyer Brown
4	1	Say What's in Your Heart	Restless Heart
7	4	Setting Me Up	Highway 101
8	5	She Deserves You	Baillie & the Boys
3	4	She Don't Love Nobody	The Desert Rose Band
23	10	She Reminded Me of You	Mickey Gilley
1	1	She's Crazy for Leavin'	Rodney Crowell
6	24	She's Gone, Gone, Gone	Glen Campbell
2	4	She's Got a Single Thing in Mind	Conway Twitty
19	—	She's There	Daniele Alexander
8	11	Sincerely	The Forester Sisters
1	1	Song of the South	Alabama
9	41	Sowin' Love	Paul Overstreet
1	1	Sunday in the South	Shenandoah
2	2	Tell It Like It Is	Billy Joe Royal
4	8	There Goes My Heart Again	Holly Dunn
7	9	There's a Tear in My Beer	Hank Williams Jr. and Hank Williams
5	4	They Rage On	Dan Seals
5	2	This Woman	K. T. Oslin
4	5	'Til Love Comes Again	Reba McEntire
4	7	'Til You Cry	Eddy Raven
1	1	Timber, I'm Falling in Love	Patty Loveless
20	34	Trainwreck of Emotion	Lorrie Morgan
1	1	Two Dozen Roses	Shenandoah
9	5	Up and Gone	Jennifer McCarter & The McCarters
8	26	The Vows Go Unbroken (Always True to You)	Kenny Rogers
1	1	What I'd Say	Earl Thomas Conley
1	2	What's Going On in Your World	George Strait
1	1	Where Did I Go Wrong	Steve Wariner
2	1	Who You Gonna Blame It on This Time	Vern Gosdin
1	1	Why'd You Come in Here Lookin' Like That	Dolly Parton
19	36	Wine Me Up	Larry Boone
4	4	(Wish I Had A) Heart of Stone	Baillie & the Boys
1	1	A Woman in Love	Ronnie Milsap
1	1	Yellow Roses	Dolly Parton
19	—	You Ain't Down Home	Jann Browne
6	11	You Ain't Goin' Nowhere	Chris Hillman & Roger McGuinn
7	3	You Got It	Roy Orbison
14	15	You Still Do	T. G. Sheppard
10	14	You'll Never Be Sorry	The Bellamy Brothers
1	1	Young Love (Strong Love)	The Judds

=== Singles released by Canadian artists ===
US	CAN	Single	Artist
—	10	As Long as We Both Shall Love	Carroll Baker
—	8	Blue Jeans Boy	J. K. Gulley
—	15	C-Luv Radio	Mike Terry
—	7	Cowboy in Your Heart	Gary Fjellgaard
—	12	The Cowboy Thing To Do	Bootleg
—	7	Do Right by Me	Michelle Wright
—	10	Donna Lee	Greg Paul
—	20	Don't You Cry For Me	The Ellis Family Band
—	19	Fiddle Texas Style	Cindi Cain
22	1	Full Moon Full of Love	k.d. lang
—	9	Goldmine	George Fox
—	20	How Long	Blue Rodeo
—	9	I Didn't Know You	Audie Henry
—	10	I Think That I'll Be Needing You	Cindi Cain
—	7	I Wish I Were Only Lonely	Michelle Wright
28	9	If I Ever Fall in Love Again	Anne Murray with Kenny Rogers
—	13	In My Dreams	Laura Vinson
—	17	Just a Place Where Mem'ries Live	Cindi Cain
—	8	Let's Build A Life Together	Family Brown
—	16	Long Distance	George Fox
—	12	Love With a Capital "L"	Murray McLauchlan
—	19	The Lucky Ones	Willie P. Bennett
—	10	The Moon Is Out to Get Me	Gary Fjellgaard with Linda Kidder
—	16	Old Broken Heart	Greg Paul
—	7	Rock Me Gently	Michelle Wright
—	10	Someday I'm Gonna Ride in a Cadillac	Matt Minglewood
—	9	The Tip of My Fingers	Anita Perras
—	15	Train of Life	Great Western Orchestra

== Top new album releases ==
US	Album	Artist	Record label
12	Absolute Torch and Twang	k.d. lang and the Reclines	Sire
11	Alone	Vern Gosdin	Columbia
24	American Dreams	The Oak Ridge Boys	MCA
1	Beyond the Blue Neon	George Strait	MCA
15	Bluebird	Emmylou Harris	Warner Bros.
2	Garth Brooks	Garth Brooks	Capitol
20	Greatest Hits	Tanya Tucker	Capitol
22	Greatest Hits 3	The Oak Ridge Boys	MCA
1	Greatest Hits III	Hank Williams, Jr.	Curb/Warner Bros.
19	Hillbilly Rock	Marty Stuart	MCA
8	Hits 1979–1989	Rosanne Cash	Columbia
2	A Horse Called Music	Willie Nelson	Columbia
2	I Wonder Do You Think of Me	Keith Whitley	RCA
3	Just Lookin' for a Hit	Dwight Yoakam	Reprise
18	Kentucky Thunder	Ricky Skaggs	Epic
15	Keys to the Highway	Rodney Crowell	Columbia
1	Killin' Time	Clint Black	RCA
6	Leave the Light On	Lorrie Morgan	RCA
10	Lyle Lovett and His Large Band	Lyle Lovett	Curb/MCA
17	Mystery Girl	Roy Orbison	Virgin
1	No Holdin' Back	Randy Travis	Warner Bros.
13	An Old Time Christmas	Randy Travis	Warner Bros.
13	One Woman Man	George Jones	Epic
22	Paint the Town	Highway 101	Warner Bros.
2	Pickin' on Nashville	The Kentucky Headhunters	Mercury
2	Reba Live	Reba McEntire	MCA
2	River of Time	The Judds	Curb/RCA
6	The Road Not Taken	Shenandoah	Columbia
2	Simple Man	The Charlie Daniels Band	Epic
10	Something Inside So Strong	Kenny Rogers	Reprise
1	Southern Star	Alabama	RCA
13	Sowin' Love	Paul Overstreet	RCA
20	Stranger Things Have Happened	Ronnie Milsap	RCA
1	Sweet Sixteen	Reba McEntire	MCA
15	Tell It Like It Is	Billy Joe Royal	Atlantic
2	When I Call Your Name	Vince Gill	MCA
3	White Limozeen	Dolly Parton	Columbia
5	Will the Circle Be Unbroken: Volume Two	Nitty Gritty Dirt Band	MCA
6	Willow in the Wind	Kathy Mattea	Mercury

=== Other top albums ===
US	Album	Artist	Record label
28	5:01 Blues	Merle Haggard	Epic
70	20 Gold Hits	Patsy Cline	MCA
42	Back in the Fire	Gene Watson	Warner Bros.
51	Beside Myself	Ray Stevens	MCA
30	The Blue Rose of Texas	Holly Dunn	Warner Bros.
29	The Boys Are Back	Sawyer Brown	Curb
45	Christmas in America	Kenny Rogers	Reprise
56	Coming Home	Wayne Newton	Curb
60	Fellow Travelers	John Conlee	16th Avenue
59	First Move	Daniele Alexander	Mercury
44	Faster & Llouder	Foster & Lloyd	RCA
52	Greatest Hits	The Forester Sisters	Warner Bros.
32	Greatest Hits Volume II	Anne Murray	Capitol
50	Greatest Hits Volume III	The Bellamy Brothers	Curb/MCA
39	House on Old Lonesome Road	Conway Twitty	MCA
55	I Am Just a Rebel	Billy Hill	Reprise
32	I Got Dreams	Steve Wariner	MCA
66	If Only For One Night	Lee Greenwood	MCA
64	Labor of Love	Janie Frickie	Columbia
33	Land of Enchantment	Michael Martin Murphey	Warner Bros.
44	Lionel Cartwright	Lionel Cartwright	MCA
48	Many Mansions	Moe Bandy	Curb
51	Moody Woman	Charley Pride	16th Avenue
38	More Great Dirt	Nitty Gritty Dirt Band	Warner Bros.
48	New Classic Waylon	Waylon Jennings	MCA
71	Next of Kin (Soundtrack)	Various Artists	Columbia
42	Next to You	Tammy Wynette	Epic
54	One Good Well	Don Williams	RCA
45	Pink Cadillac (Soundtrack)	Various Artists	Warner Bros.
49	Pure N Simple	Larry Gatlin and the Gatlin Brothers	Curb/Universal
61	Radio Romance	Canyon	16th Avenue
32	Ricky Van Shelton Sings Christmas	Ricky Van Shelton	Columbia
65	The Rodney Crowell Collection	Rodney Crowell	Warner Bros.
40	Solid as a Rock	The Shooters	Epic
41	Somewhere Between	Suzy Bogguss	Capitol
28	State of the Heart	Mary Chapin Carpenter	Columbia
40	Statler Brothers Live – Sold Out	The Statler Brothers	Mercury
68	Steppin' Stone	Marie Osmond	Capitol/Curb
40	Stones	Gary Morris	Capitol/MCA
42	Storms	Nanci Griffith	MCA
61	Sunrise	Shelby Lynne	Epic
31	Survivor	Lacy J. Dalton	Capitol/MCA
31	Temporary Sanity	Eddy Raven	Capitol
30	Turn the Tide	Baillie & the Boys	RCA
44	The Will to Love	Skip Ewing	MCA

== On television ==
=== Regular series ===
- Hee Haw (1969–1993, syndicated)

== Births ==
- January 30 - Devin Dawson, country singer-songwriter known for his 2018 hit "All on Me".
- March 10 – Rachel Reinert, member of Gloriana.
- March 20 – Lindsay Ell, Canadian country singer of the 2010s.
- August 28 – Cassadee Pope, lead singer of pop rock band Hey Monday, turned country singer; winner of the third season of The Voice
- December 13 – Taylor Swift, teen star who quickly enjoyed major crossover success by the end of the 2000s decade.

== Deaths ==
- February 4 – Kenneth C. "Jethro" Burns, 68, of the Homer and Jethro comedy duo.
- March 8 – Stuart Hamblen, 80, one of radio's first country music superstars, whose later works reflected his religious convictions.
- May 9 – Keith Whitley, 33, honky tonk-styled singer who rose to fame in the mid-1980s (alcohol poisoning)
- August 25 – Al Cherney, 56, Albertan fiddler
- September 23 – Bradley Kincaid, 94, Singer and Guitarist who started his career in 1927 in Chicago over WLS Radio, performing the traditional mountain ballads he had learned during his boyhood in Kentucky, he soon became the genre's first Multimedia superstar. He collected, recorded, and published many of the old Folk ballads, thereby preserving them for posterity. (Automobile Accident).

== Hall of Fame inductees ==
=== Country Music Hall of Fame inductees ===
- Jack Stapp (1912–1980)
- Cliffie Stone (1917–1998)
- Hank Thompson (1925–2007)

=== Canadian Country Music Hall of Fame inductees ===
- Charlie Chamberlain
- Al Cherney (posthumous)
- King Ganam
- Dallas Harms
- Earl Heywood
- Marg Osburne
- Ian Tyson
- Mercey Brothers
- Maurice Bolyer
- Don Grashey
- Maurice Bolyer

== Major awards ==
=== Grammy Awards ===
- Best Female Country Vocal Performance – Absolute Torch and Twang, k.d. lang
- Best Male Country Vocal Performance – Lyle Lovett and His Large Band, Lyle Lovett
- Best Country Performance by a Duo or Group with Vocal – Will the Circle Be Unbroken: Volume Two, Nitty Gritty Dirt Band
- Best Country Collaboration with Vocals – "There's a Tear in My Beer", Hank Williams and Hank Williams, Jr.
- Best Country Instrumental Performance – "Amazing Grace", Randy Scruggs
- Best Country Song – "After All This Time", Rodney Crowell
- Best Bluegrass Recording – "The Valley Road", Nitty Gritty Dirt Band and Bruce Hornsby

=== Juno Awards ===
- Country Male Vocalist of the Year – George Fox
- Country Female Vocalist of the Year – k.d. lang
- Country Group or Duo of the Year – Family Brown

=== Academy of Country Music ===
- Entertainer of the Year – George Strait
- Song of the Year – "Where've You Been", Jon Vezner and Don Henry (Performer: Kathy Mattea)
- Single of the Year – "A Better Man", Clint Black
- Album of the Year – Killin' Time, Clint Black
- Top Male Vocalist – Clint Black
- Top Female Vocalist – Kathy Mattea
- Top Vocal Duo – The Judds
- Top Vocal Group – Restless Heart
- Top New Male Vocalist – Clint Black
- Top New Female Vocalist – Mary Chapin Carpenter
- Top New Vocal Duo or Group – The Kentucky Headhunters
- Video of the Year – "There's a Tear in My Beer", Hank Williams, Jr. and Hank Williams (Director: Ethan Russell)

=== ARIA Awards ===
(presented in Sydney on March 6, 1989)

- Best Country Album – Boomerang Café (John Williamson)

=== Canadian Country Music Association ===
- Entertainer Artist of the Year – k.d. lang
- Male Artist of the Year – Gary Fjellgaard
- Female Artist of the Year – k.d. lang
- Group of the Year – Family Brown
- SOCAN Song of the Year – "Town of Tears", Barry Brown, Randall Prescott, Bruce Campbell (Performer: Family Brown)
- Single of the Year – "Town of Tears", Family Brown
- Album of the Year – Shadowland, k.d. lang
- Top Selling Album – Old 8×10, Randy Travis
- Vista Rising Star Award – George Fox
- Duo of the Year – Gary Fjellgaard and Linda Kidder

=== Country Music Association ===
- Entertainer of the Year – George Strait
- Song of the Year – "Chiseled in Stone", Max D. Barnes and Vern Gosdin (Performer: Vern Gosdin)
- Single of the Year – "I'm No Stranger to the Rain", Keith Whitley
- Album of the Year – Will the Circle Be Unbroken: Volume Two, Nitty Gritty Dirt Band
- Male Vocalist of the Year – Ricky Van Shelton
- Female Vocalist of the Year – Kathy Mattea
- Vocal Duo of the Year – The Judds
- Vocal Group of the Year – Highway 101
- Horizon Award – Clint Black
- Music Video of the Year – "There's a Tear in My Beer", Hank Williams, Jr. and Hank Williams (Director: Ethan Russell)
- Vocal Event of the Year – Hank Williams, Jr. and Hank Williams
- Musician of the Year – Johnny Gimble

=== Hollywood Walk of Fame ===
Stars who were honored in 1989

Jerry Lee Lewis

== Other links ==
- Country Music Association
- Inductees of the Country Music Hall of Fame
