= The Kenny Rogers Story =

Compilation album by Kenny Rogers
- Released: 1985
- Recorded: 1976–83
- Genre: Country
- Label: Liberty Records

Kenny Rogers chronology
Duets (1984)	The Kenny Rogers Story (1985)	The Heart of the Matter (1985)

The Kenny Rogers Story is a compilation album by country singer Kenny Rogers.

== Overview ==
As one of the many collections issued by Rogers, The Kenny Rogers Story: 20 Golden Hits was issued in the UK in 1985. It was never released in the US, and collects most of his UK Top 40 pop hits as well as various other singles that, while they never made it to high positions in the mainstream charts there, were popular among fans of both country and easy listening/middle of the road genres. It is similar to the 1983 issued 20 Greatest Hits from the US.

For this album, Rogers sang solo several songs from his days with The First Edition in the 1960s and early 1970s, including the No. 1 hit "Ruby, Don't Take Your Love to Town" and the top ten success "Something's Burning", as well as "Reuben James" (while this was not a pop hit in Britain, it was nevertheless well known, receiving regular airplay). Elsewhere the album includes tracks from his solo days with United Artists Records and Liberty Records. (See below for song list). Some fans have been bemused as to why his 1983 hit single with Dolly Parton, "Islands in the Stream", is "missing" on this collection. However, this track was recorded with RCA Nashville after Kenny left Liberty.

In addition to being issued on the popular formats of vinyl, cassette and compact disc, The Kenny Rogers Story was also issued on the short lived Digital Compact Cassette. The album was eventually deleted in the mid-1990s following the release of the similar themed collection Daytime Friends - The Very Best of Kenny Rogers.

=== Chart performance ===
The Kenny Rogers Story was a huge success reaching No. 1 in the UK country albums chart and No. 4 on the pop chart . It remained one of the top selling country collections for over four years, out-selling all his previous albums, and was the biggest selling country album of 1985 in the UK. In 1989, it still ranked No. 2 on the UK chart.

=== Album art ===
In what seems a tradition with Rogers' UK releases, where artwork is oft-duplicated, this album matches the 1985 album Love Is What We Make It.

== Track listing ==
No.	Title	Notes	Length
1.	"Lucille"	#1 UK, originally issued on the 1977 album Kenny Rogers	3:37
2.	"Lady"	#12 UK, originally issued on the 1980 album Greatest Hits; in the UK, titled Lady	3:54
3.	"The Long Arm of the Law"	Originally issued on the 1980 album Greatest Hits (in the UK, titled Lady	4:20
4.	"You Decorated My Life"	Originally issued on the 1979 album Kenny	3:40
5.	"Sweet Music Man"	Originally issued on the 1977 album Daytime Friends	4:21
6.	"Ruby, Don't Take Your Love to Town"	A 1977 re-recording of a First Edition hit from 1969	2:52
7.	"Love or Something Like It"	Originally issued on the 1978 album Love Or Something Like It	2:54
8.	"Through the Years"	Originally issued on the 1981 album Share Your Love	4:46
9.	"You Are So Beautiful"	Originally issued on the 1983 album We've Got Tonight	2:54
10.	"Don't Fall in Love with a Dreamer" (with Kim Carnes)	Originally issued on the 1980 album Gideon	3:41
11.	"The Gambler"	Originally issued on the 1978 album The Gambler	3:32
12.	"Daytime Friends"	#39 UK, originally issued on the 1977 album Daytime Friends	3:14
13.	"We've Got Tonight" (with Sheena Easton)	#28 UK, originally issued on the 1983 album We've Got Tonight	3:53
14.	"Love Lifted Me"	Originally issued on the 1976 album Love Lifted Me	3:47
15.	"Coward of the County"	#1 UK, originally issued on the 1979 album Kenny	4:20
16.	"Reuben James"	A 1977 re-recording of a First Edition single	2:41
17.	"Desperado"	Originally issued on the 1977 album Daytime Friends	3:47
18.	"She Believes In Me"	#42 UK, originally issued on the 1978 album The Gambler	4:13
19.	"Something's Burning"	A 1977 re-recording of a 1970 First Edition hit	4:20
20.	"Blaze of Glory"	Originally issued on the 1981 album Share Your Love	2:38
