= Duets (Kenny Rogers album) =

Compilation album by Kenny Rogers
- Released: December 1984
- Recorded: 1984
- Genre: Country
- Length: 31:23
- Label: Liberty
- Producer: Larry Butler

Kenny Rogers chronology
Once Upon a Christmas (1984)	Duets (1984)	The Kenny Rogers Story (1985)

Professional ratings
Review scores
Source	Rating
Allmusic	link

Duets is a compilation album by Kenny Rogers released in 1984 by Liberty Records, issued after Rogers left the label and signed to RCA Records.

The song "Together Again", a duet with Dottie West was released as a single from this album and reached No. 19 on the US country chart and No. 29 in Canada. It first appeared on their 1979 collaborative album Classics.

The album was eventually certified platinum and gold in the US and Canada, respectively. It reached No. 43 on the US country charts and No. 85 on the pop charts in 1984. It was one of three Kenny Rogers albums to chart that year, the others being new releases on RCA.

== Overview ==
Duets opens with "We've Got Tonight", a hit 1983 single with Sheena Easton. Side two begins with another classic duet, "Don't Fall in Love with a Dreamer" with Kim Carnes from the 1980 album Gideon. All of the remaining eight songs on the album are with Dottie West and come from his two collaboration albums with West, including the 1978 hit "Every Time Two Fools Collide" from the 1978 album of the same name. However, their duet "What Are We Doin' in Love" (a No. 1 country and top 40 pop hit) from 1981 was omitted here.

Also included on this album is Sonny and Cher's "All I Ever Need Is You". Rogers' producer Larry Butler co-wrote "(Hey Won't You Play) Another Somebody Done Somebody Wrong Song" with Chips Moman. "'Til I Can Make It On My Own" and "That's the Way It Could Have Been" are two Tammy Wynette numbers.

== Track listing ==
All tracks with Dottie West, unless otherwise indicated.

Side one
No.	Title	Writer(s)	Original album	Length
1.	"We've Got Tonight" (with Sheena Easton)	Bob Seger	We've Got Tonight (1983)	3:52
2.	"Every Time Two Fools Collide"	John Dyes, Jeffrey M. Tweel	Every Time Two Fools Collide (1978)	3:01
3.	"(Hey Won't You Play) Another Somebody Done Somebody Wrong Song"	Larry Butler, Chips Moman	Classics (1979)	3:11
4.	"'Til I Can Make It on My Own"	George Richey, Billy Sherrill, Tammy Wynette	Classics (1979)	3:20
5.	"All I Ever Need Is You"	Jimmy Holiday, Eddie Reeves	Classics (1979)	3:09

Side two
No.	Title	Writer(s)	Original album	Length
1.	"Don't Fall in Love with a Dreamer" (with Kim Carnes)	Kim Carnes, Dave Ellingson	Gideon (1980)	3:41
2.	"Baby I'm-A Want You"	David Gates	Every Time Two Fools Collide (1978)	2:47
3.	"Together Again"	Buck Owens	Classics (1979)	2:56
4.	"Anyone Who Isn't Me Tonight"	Julie Didler, Casey Kelly	Every Time Two Fools Collide (1978)	2:22
5.	"That's the Way It Could Have Been"	Tammy Wynette	Every Time Two Fools Collide (1978)	3:04

== Chart performance ==
Chart (1984)	Peak position
U.S. Billboard Top Country Albums	43
U.S. Billboard 200	85
Australian (Kent Music Report) Albums	11
Canadian RPM Top Albums	64

== Certifications ==
Region	Certification	Certified units/sales
Poland (ZPAV)	Gold	30,000
