= Scarlet fever (disambiguation) =

Scarlet fever is a relatively common disease.

Scarlet Fever may also refer to:

- Scarlet Fever (band)
- "Scarlet Fever" (song)
