= Kenny Rogers (disambiguation) =

Kenny Rogers (1938–2020) was an American singer and songwriter.

Kenny Rogers may also refer to:

== Related to Kenny Rogers ==
- Kenny Rogers (album), his 1977 studio album
- Kenny Rogers discography
- Kenny Rogers Roasters, the restaurant chain he co-founded

== Other uses ==
- Kenny Rogers (baseball) (born 1964), American baseball player
- Kenny Rogers and The First Edition, an American country rock band
- Kenny Rogers as The Gambler, a 1980 TV film
