= We've Got Tonight (disambiguation) =

"We've Got Tonight" is a song by Bob Seger.

We've Got Tonight may also refer to:

- We've Got Tonight (Kenny Rogers album), 1983
- We've Got Tonight (Elkie Brooks album)
