= Greatest Hits (1988 Kenny Rogers album) =

Greatest hits album by Kenny Rogers
- Released: 1988
- Recorded: 1983–87
- Genre: Country
- Length: 39:05
- Label: RCA Victor

Kenny Rogers chronology
I Prefer the Moonlight (1987)	Greatest Hits (1988)	Something Inside So Strong (1989)

Professional ratings
Review scores
Source	Rating
Allmusic	3/5 stars

Greatest Hits is a 1988 compilation album by Kenny Rogers.

All of the tracks on the album were selected from his various recordings for RCA Nashville between 1983 and 1987. There is one track that was not originally a single called "She's Ready for Someone to Love Her", which makes fully half of this greatest hits track list identical to the most recent 1987 album I Prefer the Moonlight.

One single that is notably missing is "Tomb of the Unknown Love" from 1985's The Heart of the Matter. The song was a #1 single in both the US and Canada. Also missing is Rogers' 1986 single "The Pride is Back" which made #30 on the US Billboard AC chart, it had not yet been released on any album. "I Don't Call Him Daddy" was released as a single in support of this album, but with little promotion it peaked at #86 on the country chart.

== Track listing ==
No.	Title	Writer(s)	Original album	Length
1.	"Islands in the Stream" (with Dolly Parton)	Barry Gibb, Robin Gibb, Maurice Gibb	Eyes That See in the Dark (1983)	4:08
2.	"Crazy"	Richard Marx, Kenny Rogers	What About Me? (1984)	3:40
3.	"Buried Treasure"	B. Gibb, R. Gibb, M. Gibb	Eyes That See in the Dark (1983)	4:08
4.	"Twenty Years Ago"	Wood Newton, Michael Noble, Michael Spriggs, Dan Tyler	They Don't Make Them Like They Used To (1986)	3:44
5.	"I Don't Call Him Daddy"	Reed Nielsen	I Prefer the Moonlight (1987)	4:06
6.	"I Prefer the Moonlight"	Gary Chapman, Mark Wright	I Prefer the Moonlight (1987)	5:07
7.	"The Factory"	Bud McGuire	I Prefer the Moonlight (1987)	3:18
8.	"She's Ready for Someone to Love Her"	Charlie Black, Jerry Gillespie, Tommy Rocco	I Prefer the Moonlight (1987)	2:52
9.	"Make No Mistake, She's Mine" (with Ronnie Milsap)	Kim Carnes	I Prefer the Moonlight (1987)	3:54
10.	"Morning Desire"	Dave Loggins	The Heart of the Matter (1985)	4:08

== Chart performance ==
Chart performance for Greatest Hits
Chart (1988)	Peak position
US Top Country Albums (Billboard)	66

== Certifications ==
Region	Certification	Certified units/sales
United States (RIAA)	Gold	500,000^{^}
^{^} Shipments figures based on certification alone.
