= He Talks to Me =

Single by Lorrie Morgan

from the album Leave the Light On
- B-side: "If I Didn't Love You"
- Released: April 1990
- Genre: Country
- Length: 3:27
- Label: RCA Nashville
- Songwriters: Mike Reid; Rory Bourke
- Producer: Barry Beckett

Lorrie Morgan singles chronology
"Five Minutes" (1990)	"He Talks to Me" (1990)	"'Til a Tear Becomes a Rose" (1990)

"He Talks to Me" is a song written by Mike Reid and Rory Bourke, and recorded by American country music artist Lorrie Morgan. It was released in April 1990 as the fifth single from her album Leave the Light On. The song reached #4 on the Billboard Hot Country Singles & Tracks chart in August 1990.

The song had previously been recorded by RCA country act, Sylvia, but was not released at the time. The track was released digitally as part of Sylvia's 'Lost Album' Knockin' Around in June of 2024.

== Chart performance ==
Chart (1990)	Peak position
Canada Country Singles (RPM)	7
US Hot Country Songs (Billboard)	4

=== Year-end charts ===
Chart (1990)	Position
Canada Country Tracks (RPM)	94
US Country Songs (Billboard)	64
