= As I Am (Anne Murray album) =

Studio album by Anne Murray
- Released: 1988
- Studios: Nightingale Studio and GroundStar Studios (Nashville, Tennessee, USA); Morningstar Sound Studio (Hendersonville, Tennessee, USA); The Hop (Los Angeles, California, USA); Eastern Sound and Manta Sound (Toronto, Ontario, Canada)
- Genre: Country
- Length: 39:07
- Label: Capitol
- Producer: Kyle Lehning

Anne Murray chronology
Harmony (1987)	As I Am (1988)	Greatest Hits Volume II (1989)

As I Am is the twenty-fourth studio album by Canadian country pop artist Anne Murray. It was released by Capitol Records in 1988. The album peaked at number 29 on the Billboard Top Country Albums chart.

The album received a mixed review in People, which said that "This album, thank goodness, has no hint of the Disco Annie mode that has crept into some later Murray albums" but added that it was "listless".

== Track listing ==
No.	Title	Writer(s)	Length
1.	"Flying on Your Own"	Rita MacNeil	4:27
2.	"If I Don't Fall Tonight"	Rick Bowles, Will Robinson, Michael Bonagura	3:18
3.	"You Make Me Curious"	Shirley Eikhard	4:18
4.	"As I Am"	Randy Goodrum	3:10
5.	"I'm Losing Your Love"	Kye Fleming, Vince Gill, Hank DeVito	4:35
6.	"I'll Be Your Eyes"	Paul Janz, Pamela Phillips-Oland	3:42
7.	"Slow All Night"	Karla Bonoff	4:20
8.	"Who But You"	Charlie Black, Rory Bourke, K. T. Oslin	3:29
9.	"Take It from My Heart"	Austin Roberts, Black, Jill Colucci	3:49
10.	"Slow Passin' Time"	Black, Bourke, Tommy Rocco	3:59

== Personnel ==
- Anne Murray – lead vocals, backing vocals (1, 3, 5–10)
- Shane Keister – keyboards (1, 2, 4, 6, 8, 10), sequencing (6)
- Mike Lawler – keyboards (1, 2)
- Doug Riley – acoustic piano (2, 4, 5, 8, 9), keyboards (7)
- David Humphreys – Fairlight programming (2, 3, 5, 6, 9)
- Robbie Buchanan – synthesizers (3), arrangements (3)
- Dennis Burnside – keyboards (5, 7, 8)
- Steve Sexton – keyboards (5, 7, 9)
- Mark Casstevens – acoustic guitar (1, 2, 4, 6, 8, 10)
- Steve Gibson – electric guitar (1–6, 8, 10), acoustic guitar (2, 10)
- Greg Jennings – electric guitar solo (1, 6), guitar solo (2)
- Larry Byrom – acoustic guitar (2, 4, 8)
- Bob Mann – electric guitar (5, 9), acoustic guitar (7)
- Mike "Pepe" Francis – electric guitar (5, 7), acoustic guitar (9)
- Doyle Grisham – steel guitar (10)
- Mike Brignardello – bass (1, 2, 4, 6, 8, 10)
- David Hungate – bass (3)
- Tom Szczesniak – bass (5, 7, 9)
- Paul Leim – drums (1, 2, 4, 6, 8, 10)
- Barry Keane – drums (5, 7, 9)
- Terry McMillan – percussion (1, 3, 8, 10)
- Jim Horn – saxophone (3, 5, 7, 9)
- Rick Wilkins – string arrangements and conductor
- Bruce Murray – backing vocals (1, 5–7)
- Debbie Schaal – backing vocals (1, 3, 5–10)
- Kathie Baillie – backing vocals (2)
- Michael Bonagura – backing vocals (2)
- Alan LeBoeuf – backing vocals (2)
- Shirley Eikhard – backing vocals (3, 9)
- Denny Henson – backing vocals (5)
- Walter Igelheart – backing vocals (5)
- Dennis Locorriere – backing vocals (5)

== Production ==
- Balmur Limited – executive producers
- Kyle Lehning – producer, mixing, additional overdubs, engineer (3)
- Joe Bogan – engineer (1, 2, 4, 6, 8, 10)
- Ken Friesen – engineer (5, 7, 9), vocal engineer, string engineer
- Scott Campbell – string engineer
- Kirt Odle – assistant engineer (1, 2, 4, 6, 8, 10), additional overdubs
- Gary Paczosa – assistant engineer (1, 2, 4, 6, 8, 10)
- Joe Mancuso – assistant engineer (5, 7, 9), assistant vocal engineer
- John Condon – additional overdub assistant
- John Frickle – mix assistant
- Keith Odle – mix assistant
- Doug Sax – mastering at The Mastering Lab (Hollywood, California, USA)
- Paul Cade – art direction, design
- Nigel Dickson – photography
- Leonard T. Rambeau – management

== Charts ==
=== Weekly charts ===
Chart (1988)	Peak position
Australian Albums (ARIA)	151
Canadian Albums (RPM)	80
Canadian Country Albums (RPM)	18
US Top Country Albums (Billboard)	29

=== Year-end charts ===
Chart (1989)	Position
US Top Country Albums (Billboard)	63
