= Phil Brooks =

Phil Brooks may refer to:

== Sports ==
- Phillip Brooks (American football) (born 1999), American football player
- Phil Brooks (American football) (born 1937), American football coach
- Phil Brooks (footballer) (1901–1963), Australian rules footballer
- Phil Brooks or CM Punk (born 1978), American professional wrestler and mixed martial artist

== Others ==
- Philip C. Brooks (1906–1977), American archivist
- Philip John Brooks, British folk and rock musician

== See also ==
- Phillips Brooks (1835–1893), Bishop of Massachusetts in the Episcopal Church during the early 1890s
