= Five Minutes (Lorrie Morgan song) =

Single by Lorrie Morgan

from the album Leave the Light On
- B-side: "I'll Take the Memories"
- Released: December 1989
- Recorded: 1988
- Genre: Country
- Length: 3:36
- Label: RCA Nashville
- Songwriter: Beth Nielsen Chapman
- Producer: Barry Beckett

Lorrie Morgan singles chronology
| "Out of Your Shoes" (1989) | "Five Minutes" (1989) | "He Talks to Me" (1990) |

"Five Minutes" is a country music song written by Beth Nielsen Chapman. It was recorded by Lorrie Morgan for her debut album Leave the Light On, and released as the album's fourth single. In April 1990, the song became Morgan's first number one hit on the Billboard Hot Country Singles & Tracks chart.

It was also recorded by Pam Tillis in the late 1980s during her tenure on Warner Bros. Records, but was not issued on an album until the 1994 Pam Tillis Collection.

== Content ==
The song features a female protagonist telling her lover that he has "five minutes" to come up with a solution to their failing relationship. Country Universe writer Kevin John Coyne rated the song "B+", as he thought it showed Morgan's growth as a vocalist since her first album.

== Chart performance ==
| Chart (1990) | Peak position |
|---|---|
| Canada Country Singles (RPM) | 9 |
| US Hot Country Songs (Billboard) | 1 |

=== Year-end charts ===
| Chart (1990) | Position |
|---|---|
| US Country Songs (Billboard) | 14 |
