= Out of Your Shoes =

Single by Lorrie Morgan

from the album Leave the Light On
- B-side: "One More Last Time"
- Released: July 1989
- Genre: Country
- Length: 3:15
- Label: RCA Nashville
- Songwriters: Jill Wood; Sharon Spivey; Patti Ryan
- Producer: Barry Beckett

Lorrie Morgan singles chronology
"Dear Me" (1989)	"Out of Your Shoes" (1989)	"Five Minutes" (1990)

"Out of Your Shoes" is a song written by Patti Ryan, Jill Wood and Sharon Spivey, and recorded by American country music artist Lorrie Morgan. It was released in July 1989 as the third single from her album Leave the Light On. The song reached #2 on the Billboard Hot Country Singles chart in December 1989. It also reached the number one position of the country music charts at Radio & Records.

== Chart performance ==
Chart (1989–1990)	Peak position
Canada Country Singles (RPM)	3
US Hot Country Songs (Billboard)	2

=== Year-end charts ===
Chart (1990)	Position
Canada Country Tracks (RPM)	86
US Country Songs (Billboard)	36
