= The Factory (song) =

Single by Kenny Rogers

from the album I Prefer the Moonlight
- B-side: "One More Day"
- Released: January 1988
- Genre: Country
- Length: 3:18
- Label: RCA Nashville
- Songwriter: Bud McGuire
- Producer: Larry Butler

Kenny Rogers singles chronology
| "I Prefer the Moonlight" (1987) | "The Factory" (1988) | "When You Put Your Heart in It" (1988) |

"The Factory" is a song written by Bud McGuire, and recorded by American country music artist Kenny Rogers. It was released in January 1988 as the third single from the album I Prefer the Moonlight and reached at number 6 on the Billboard Hot Country Singles & Tracks chart.

== Content ==
The song is about the life, dreams, hopes and struggles of McGuire's father, Harvey. Bud McGuire is the brother of Mike McGuire, founding member and drummer of the country music group Shenandoah.

== Charts ==
=== Weekly charts ===
| Chart (1988) | Peak position |
|---|---|
| US Hot Country Songs (Billboard) | 6 |
| Canadian RPM Country Tracks | 3 |

=== Year-end charts ===
| Chart (1988) | Position |
|---|---|
| US Hot Country Songs (Billboard) | 100 |
