= Daytime Friends – The Very Best of Kenny Rogers =

Daytime Friends - The Very Best of Kenny Rogers

Greatest hits album by Kenny Rogers
- Released: 1993
- Genre: Country
- Length: 73:01
- Label: EMI Classics

Daytime Friends – The Very Best of Kenny Rogers is a 1993 compilation album by country superstar Kenny Rogers.

== Overview ==
This album has remained in print longer than Rogers other collections The Kenny Rogers Singles Album and The Kenny Rogers Story, the latter of which has the same quantity of tracks, but differs somewhat in track listing. The album peaked at #5 on the UK sales charts upon re-entry in 2005.

Professional ratings
Review scores
Source	Rating
AllMusic	link
Music Week	4/5 stars

== Track listing ==
No.	Title	Writer(s)	Length
1.	"The Gambler"	Don Schiltz	3:30
2.	"Daytime Friends"	Ben Peters	3:09
3.	"Lucille"	Roger Bowling/Hal Bynum	3:34
4.	"Ruby Don't Take Your Love to Town"	Mel Tillis	2:50
5.	"Don't Fall in Love with a Dreamer" (with Kim Carnes)	Carnes/Dave Ellingson	3:39
6.	"Coward of the County"	Bowling/Billy Edd Wheeler	4:18
7.	"You Decorated My Life"	Debbie Hupp/Bob Morrison	3:37
8.	"Reuben James"	Barry Etris/Alex Harvey	2:39
9.	"She Believes in Me"	Steve Gibb	4:11
10.	"Long Arm of the Law"	Bowling/Wheeler	4:19
11.	"'Til I Can Make It on My Own" (with Dottie West)	George Richey/Billy Sherrill/Tammy Wynette	3:19
12.	"The Son of Hickory Holler's Tramp"	Dallas Frazier	3:04
13.	"Sweet Music Man"	Rogers	4:16
14.	"Green Green Grass of Home"	Curly Putman	3:34
15.	"We've Got Tonight" (with Sheena Easton)	Bob Seger	3:52
16.	"Something's Burning"	Mac Davis	4:18
17.	"Desperado"	Glenn Frey/Don Henley	3:45
18.	"Lady"	Lionel Richie	3:51
19.	"Abraham, Martin and John"	Dick Holler	4:16
20.	"Every Time Two Fools Collide" (with Dottie West)	John Dyes/Jeffrey M. Tweel	3:00

== Certifications ==
Region	Certification	Certified units/sales
Australia (ARIA)	Gold	35,000^{^}
Spain (Promusicae)	Gold	50,000^{^}
^{^} Shipments figures based on certification alone.
