= Maybe (Kenny Rogers and Holly Dunn song) =

Single by Kenny Rogers with Holly Dunn

from the album Something Inside So Strong
- B-side: "If I Knew Then What I Know Now"
- Released: February 17, 1990
- Genre: Country
- Length: 3:29
- Label: Reprise
- Songwriters: Bill Rice, Sharon Vaughn
- Producer: Jim Ed Norman

Kenny Rogers singles chronology
"If I Ever Fall in Love Again" (1989)	"Maybe" (1990)	"Love Is Strange" (1990)

Holly Dunn singles chronology
"There Goes My Heart Again" (1989)	"Maybe" (1990)	"My Anniversary for Being a Fool" (1990)

"Maybe" is a song written by Bill Rice and Sharon Vaughn, and by American country music artists Kenny Rogers and Holly Dunn. It was released in February 1990 as the fourth single from Rogers' album Something Inside So Strong. The song reached #25 on the Billboard Hot Country Singles & Tracks chart.

== Chart performance ==
Chart (1990)	Peak position
Canada Country Singles (RPM)	17
US Hot Country Songs (Billboard)	25
