= Leave the Light On (Lorrie Morgan album) =

Studio album by Lorrie Morgan
- Released: May 11, 1989
- Recorded: 1988
- Studio: Castle Recording Studios, Franklin, TN, Audio Media Recorders, Digital Studios, and Omnisound Studios, Nashville, TN
- Genre: Country
- Label: RCA Nashville
- Producer: Barry Beckett

Lorrie Morgan chronology
Leave the Light On (1989)	Something in Red (1991)

Singles from Leave the Light On
- 1. "Trainwreck of Emotion" Released: December 10, 1988; 2. "Dear Me" Released: February 1989; 3. "Out of Your Shoes" Released: July 1989; 4. "Five Minutes" Released: December 1989; 5. "He Talks to Me" Released: April 1990

Professional ratings
Review scores
Source	Rating
AllMusic	4.5/5 stars
Chicago Tribune	3.5/4 stars
Robert Christgau	B
Hi-Fi News & Record Review	A:1

Leave the Light On is the debut studio album by American country music singer Lorrie Morgan. Its singles were "Trainwreck of Emotion" at No. 20, "Dear Me" at No. 9, "Out of Your Shoes" at No. 2, "Five Minutes" at No. 1, and "He Talks to Me" at No. 4. On the original vinyl LP, there were only nine tracks, but the CD version adds two more, including a cover of the Beatles' 1965 single "Eight Days a Week."

== Track listing ==
No.	Title	Writer(s)	Length
1.	"Trainwreck of Emotion"	Jon Vezner, Alan Rhody	3:07
2.	"Out of Your Shoes"	Jill Wood, Sharon Spivey, Patti Ryan	3:15
3.	"I'll Take the Memories"	Charlie Craig, Keith Stegall	3:54
4.	"Far Side of the Bed"	Susie McCoy	3:57
5.	"Dear Me"	Carson Whitsett, Scott Mateer	3:44
6.	"Five Minutes"	Beth Nielsen Chapman	3:32
7.	"He Talks to Me"	Mike Reid, Rory Bourke	3:27
8.	"It's Too Late (To Love Me Now)"	Bourke, Gene Dobbins, Johnny Wilson	3:40
9.	"Gonna Leave the Light On"	Will Robinson, Don Pfrimmer	3:02
10.	"Eight Days a Week"	Paul McCartney, John Lennon	2:33
11.	"If I Didn't Love You"	Rafe Van Hoy, Deborah Allen	3:21

== Personnel ==
Adapted from liner notes.

- Eddie Bayers - drums
- Barry Beckett - keyboards
- Steve Gibson - electric guitar
- Lloyd Green - steel guitar
- Randy Hayes - background vocals
- Mitch Humphries - keyboards
- Doug Jernigan - steel guitar
- Mike Lawler - keyboards
- Carl Marsh - special fairlight series III programming
- Lorrie Morgan - lead vocals
- Mark O'Connor - fiddle
- Dave Pomeroy - bass guitar
- Don Potter - acoustic guitar
- Bruce Rutherford - background vocals
- Reggie Young - electric guitar

== Charts ==
=== Weekly charts ===
Chart (1989–1990)	Peak position
Canadian Country Albums (RPM)	29
US Billboard 200	117
US Top Country Albums (Billboard)	6

=== Year-end charts ===
Chart (1989)	Position
US Top Country Albums (Billboard)	65
Chart (1990)	Position
US Top Country Albums (Billboard)	5
Chart (1991)	Position
US Top Country Albums (Billboard)	35

== Certifications ==
Region	Certification	Certified units/sales
United States (RIAA)	Platinum	1,000,000^{^}
^{^} Shipments figures based on certification alone.
