= Trainwreck of Emotion =

Single by Lorrie Morgan

from the album Leave the Light On
- B-side: "One More Last Time"
- Released: December 10, 1988
- Genre: Country
- Length: 3:08
- Label: RCA Nashville
- Songwriter(s): Alan Rhody; Jon Vezner
- Producer(s): Barry Beckett

Lorrie Morgan singles chronology
| "Don't Go Changing" (1984) | "Trainwreck of Emotion" (1988) | "Dear Me" (1989) |

"Trainwreck of Emotion" is a song written by Jon Vezner and Alan Rhody, and recorded by American country music artist Lorrie Morgan. It was released in December 1988 as the first single from the album Leave the Light On. The song reached #20 on the Billboard Hot Country Singles & Tracks chart.

== Chart performance ==
| Chart (1988–1989) | Peak position |
|---|---|
| US Hot Country Songs (Billboard) | 20 |
