= Philip John Brooks =

British singer

Philip John Brooks, who also performs as Philip Brooks, is an English folk and rock musician. He grew up in Fleetwood, Lancashire, England, but now lives in the United States. He sings, plays guitar, and writes folk music in both American and British styles. He has produced four solo albums, Fishermen of Fleetwood about his experiences growing up in a fishing town, A Different Place, A Different Time and Canyon Road about the Southwestern United States and its colorful history and current events, and Dancing Through Time. He currently plays in his home state of Georgia and regularly tours the southwest, particularly New Mexico, Colorado, and Texas.

== Discography ==
- Dancing Through Time (recorded in Nashville)
- Canyon Road (recorded in Nashville)
- One track on the compilation The Revolution Collection: Songs of New Mexico
- A Different Place, A Different Time (recorded in Nashville)
- The Fishermen of Fleetwood (recorded in Georgia)
- Jimmy Rose & The Country Pie Featuring Phil Brooks (recorded in London)
- The Detroits 'Tis us ourselves (recorded in London)
