= Every Time Two Fools Collide – The Best of Kenny Rogers and Dottie West =

Every Time Two Fools Collide - The Best of Kenny Rogers and Dottie West

Compilation album by Kenny Rogers
- Released: 1993
- Recorded: 1978–81
- Genre: Country
- Length: 31:51
- Label: EMI/Capitol

Professional ratings
Review scores
Source	Rating
AllMusic	link

Every Time Two Fools Collide – The Best of Kenny Rogers and Dottie West is a 1993 compilation album by country singers Kenny Rogers and Dottie West.

== Overview ==
The album collects a selection of songs recorded by Rogers and West in the 1970s and 1980s. It features selections from the two studio albums the duo made, as well as the 1981 single "What Are We Doin' in Love?", one of their three US number one chart singles.

== Track listing ==
1. "Every Time Two Fools Collide" (John Dyes/Jeffrey M. Tweel) (3:02)
2. "You Needed Me" (Randy Goodrum) (3:11)
3. "All I Ever Need Is You" (Jimmy Holiday/Eddie Reeves) (3:09)
4. "What Are We Doin' in Love?" (Goodrum) (3:03)
5. "(Hey Won't You Play) Another Somebody Done Somebody Wrong Song" (Larry Butler/Chips Moman) (3:11)
6. "Let It Be Me" (Gilbert Bécaud/Mann Curtis/Pierre Delanoé) (3:27)
7. "Anyone Who Isn't Me Tonight" (Julie Didler/Casey Kelly) (2:23)
8. "'Til I Can Make It on My Own" (George Richey/Billy Sherrill/Tammy Wynette) (3:20)
9. "Together Again" (Buck Owens) (2:57)
10. "You've Lost That Lovin' Feelin'" (Barry Mann/Phil Spector/Cynthia Weil) (4:08)
