= If You Want to Find Love =

Single by Kenny Rogers

from the album Back Home Again
- B-side: "Sunshine"
- Released: November 30, 1991
- Genre: Country
- Length: 3:08
- Label: Reprise
- Songwriters: Kenny Rogers, Skip Ewing, Max D. Barnes
- Producers: Jim Ed Norman, Eric Prestidge

Kenny Rogers singles chronology
"What I Did for Love" (1991)	"If You Want to Find Love" (1991)	"Someone Must Feel Like a Fool Tonight" (1992)

"If You Want to Find Love" is a song co-written and recorded by American country music artist Kenny Rogers. It was released in November 1991 as the first single from the album Back Home Again. The song reached #11 on the Billboard Hot Country Singles & Tracks chart. Rogers wrote the song with Skip Ewing and Max D. Barnes.

The song features backing vocals from Linda Davis and the Branson Brothers.

== Chart performance ==
Chart (1991–1992)	Peak position
Canada Country Singles (RPM)	12
US Hot Country Songs (Billboard)	11
