= Crazy (Kenny Rogers song) =

1984 single by Kenny Rogers

Single by Kenny Rogers

from the album What About Me?
- B-side: "The Stranger"
- Released: December 17, 1984
- Recorded: 1984
- Genre: Country pop
- Length: 3:43
- Label: RCA
- Songwriters: Richard Marx; Kenny Rogers
- Producers: David Foster; Kenny Rogers

Kenny Rogers singles chronology
"What About Me?" (1984)	"Crazy" (1984)	"Love Is What We Make it" (1985)

"Crazy" is a song by American singer Kenny Rogers, co-written with Richard Marx from his 1984 album What About Me?. It was released in December 1984 as the album's second single, following the title track.

The song was Rogers' eleventh Country chart-topping single as a solo artist. The single spent a total of thirteen weeks in the Country chart's Top 40. It also peaked at number five on the Billboard's Adult Contemporary chart.

== Charts ==
=== Weekly charts ===
Chart (1984–1985)	Peak position
Australian (Kent Music Report)	56
US Billboard Hot 100	79
US Adult Contemporary (Billboard)	5
US Hot Country Songs (Billboard)	1
Canadian RPM Country Tracks	1
Canadian RPM Adult Contemporary Tracks	1

=== Year-end charts ===
Chart (1985)	Position
US Adult Contemporary (Billboard)	31
US Hot Country Songs (Billboard)	41
