= I Prefer the Moonlight =

I Prefer The Moonlight

Studio album by Kenny Rogers
- Released: 1987
- Recorded: 1987
- Studio: Eleven Eleven Studio, Masterfonics, MasterMix, GroundStar Laboratories and Sixteenth Avenue Sound (Nashville, Tennessee); Creative Recording (Berry Hill, Tennessee); Lion Share Studios and Hitsville U.S.A. (Los Angeles, California); The Grey Room and Conway Studios (Hollywood, California)
- Genre: Country
- Length: 37:15
- Label: RCA Victor
- Producer: Brown Bannister; Larry Butler; Rob Galbraith; Richard Landis; Kyle Lehning; Brent Maher

Kenny Rogers chronology
| They Don't Make Them Like They Used To (1986) | I Prefer The Moonlight (1987) | Greatest Hits (1988) |

Professional ratings
Review scores
| Source | Rating |
|---|---|
| Allmusic | link |

I Prefer the Moonlight is the twentieth studio album by American country music singer Kenny Rogers, released in 1987. The album was Rogers' final studio album for RCA Records. It peaked at number 18 on the US country charts and number 163 in the Billboard 200. It contained three top five singles: the title track, the Grammy-winning duet with Ronnie Milsap, "Make No Mistake, She's Mine" and "The Factory".

== Singles ==
The initial single was the Ronnie Milsap duet "Make No Mistake, She's Mine", which brought Rogers and Milsap to the top of the charts in both the US and Canada. The title cut was released next, and reached #2, a feat equaled to the north as well. "The Factory" was the third single, and reached #6 in the US and #3 in Canada. A final venture was made with "I Don't Call Him Daddy", a lesser hit, peaking at #86. (The release of "I Don't Call Him Daddy" was to support the 1988 RCA "Greatest Hits" release, and received little promotion as Rogers was leaving the label.)

== Track listing ==
| No. | Title | Writer(s) | Length |
|---|---|---|---|
| 1. | "I Prefer the Moonlight" | Gary Chapman, Mark Wright | 5:10 |
| 2. | "Now and Forever" | Wayne Kirkpatrick, Keith Thomas | 4:09 |
| 3. | "We're Doin' Alright" | Reed Nielsen | 4:00 |
| 4. | "Make No Mistake, She's Mine (With Ronnie Milsap)" | Kim Carnes | 3:57 |
| 5. | "One More Day" | John Barlow Jarvis, Nielsen | 2:57 |
| 6. | "She's Ready for Someone to Love Her" | Charlie Black, Jerry Gillespie, Tommy Rocco | 2:51 |
| 7. | "I Don't Call Him Daddy" | Nielsen | 4:08 |
| 8. | "The Factory" | Bud McGuire | 3:26 |
| 9. | "We Fell in Love Anyway" | Naomi Martin, Mike Reid | 3:21 |
| 10. | "You Can't Say You Don't Love Me Anymore" | Jarvis, Bill Lamb | 3:15 |

== Personnel ==
- Kenny Rogers – vocals
- Shane Keister – keyboards (1), additional keyboards (2), synthesizers (4)
- Robbie Buchanan – additional keyboards (2)
- Keith Thomas – keyboards (2)
- Philip Aaberg – acoustic piano (3, 5, 7)
- John Barlow Jarvis – acoustic piano (3, 5, 7, 9, 10)
- Jim Lang – organ (3, 5, 7)
- Alan Pasqua – synthesizers (3, 5, 7)
- Clayton Ivey – acoustic piano (4)
- Ronnie Milsap – electric piano (4), vocals (4)
- Bobby Ogdin – keyboards (6, 8–10), acoustic piano (9, 10)
- Gary Chapman – acoustic guitar (1), backing vocals (1)
- Dann Huff – additional guitars (1), guitars (2, 3, 5, 7)
- Jerry McPherson – slide guitar (1), guitars (2)
- Dean Parks – guitars (3, 5, 7)
- Fred Tackett – guitars (3, 5, 7)
- Bruce Dees – electric guitar (4)
- Jimmy Capps – acoustic guitar (6, 8)
- Pete Wade – acoustic guitar (6, 8)
- Billy Sanford – electric lead guitar (6, 8)
- Don Potter – acoustic guitar (9, 10), backing vocals (10)
- Larry Byrom – electric guitar (9, 10)
- Mark O'Connor – mandolin (1), fiddle (1)
- Mike Brignardello – bass (1, 2)
- Neil Stubenhaus – bass (3, 5, 7)
- David Hungate – bass (4)
- Bob Wray – bass (6, 8)
- Jack Williams – bass (9, 10)
- Paul Leim – drums (1, 2)
- John Robinson – drums (3, 5, 7)
- Larrie Londin – drums (4)
- James Stroud – drums (6, 8), percussion (6)
- Eddie Bayers – drums (9, 10)
- Lenny Castro – percussion (1, 2)
- Richard Landis – percussion (3, 5, 7)
- Charlie Calello – arrangements (3, 5, 7)
- David T. Clydesdale – string arrangements (4)
- Shelby Singleton – string arrangements (6)
- Archie Jordan – string arrangements (9, 10)
- Carl Gorodetzky – concertmaster (4, 6, 8–10)
- The Nashville String Machine – strings (4, 6, 8–10)
- Kim Carnes – vocals (1)
- Chris Harris – backing vocals (1)
- Wayne Kirkpatrick – backing vocals (1, 2)
- Diana DeWitt – backing vocals (2)
- Chris Eaton – backing vocals (2)
- Tommy Funderburk – backing vocals (3, 5, 7)
- Jim Haas – backing vocals (3, 5, 7)
- Jon Joyce – backing vocals (3, 5, 7)
- Clif Magness – backing vocals (3, 5, 7)
- George Merill – backing vocals (3, 5, 7)
- Wendy Suits-Johnson – backing vocals (6, 8)
- Diane Vanette – backing vocals (6, 8)
- Bergen White – backing vocals (6, 8)
- Dennis Wilson – backing vocals (6, 8)
- Juice Newton – harmony vocals (9)

== Production ==
- Brown Bannister – producer (1, 2)
- Richard Landis – producer (3, 5, 7)
- Rob Galbraith – producer (4)
- Kyle Lehning – producer (4)
- Larry Butler – producer (6, 8)
- Brent Maher – producer (9, 10)
- Kimberley Smith – production coordinator (1, 2)
- Mary Hamilton – art direction
- John Coulter – design
- Kelly Junkermann – photography
- Vance Lorenzine – set designer
- Rose Librizzi – stylist
- Ken Kragen – management

Technical credits

- Glenn Meadows – mastering (1, 2, 9, 10) at Masterfonics (Nashville, Tennessee)
- Wally Traugott – mastering (3, 5, 7) at Capitol Studios (Hollywood, California)
- Doug Sax – mastering (4) at The Mastering Lab (Hollywood, California)
- Denny Purcell – mastering (6, 8) at Georgetown Masters (Nashville, Tennessee)
- Jeff Balding – engineer (1, 2), mixing (1, 2)
- Mick Guzauski – track recording (3, 5, 7)
- Jim Dineen – overdub recording (3, 5, 7)
- Rick Ruggeri – horn and string recording (3, 5, 7)
- Ed Thacker – mixing (3, 5, 7)
- Ben Harris – engineer (4)
- Kyle Lehning – engineer (4)
- Harold Lee – engineer (6, 8)
- Billy Sherrill – engineer (6, 8)
- Richard Landis – engineer (9)
- Brent Maher – engineer (9, 10), mixing (9, 10)
- Jean Kinney – basic track recording assistant (1, 2)
- Dave Parker – basic track recording assistant (1, 2)
- Michael Koreiba – mix assistant (1, 2), overdub assistant (1, 2)
- Laura Livingston – overdub assistant (1, 2)
- Keith Odle – overdub assistant (1, 2)
- Bill Whittington – overdub assistant (1, 2)
- Richard McKernan – tracking assistant (3, 5, 7)
- Michael Dotson – horn and string recording assistant (3, 5, 7)
- James Johnson – horn and string recording assistant (3, 5, 7)
- Randy Gardner – assistant engineer (4)
- Jim McKell – assistant engineer (9, 10)

== Charts ==
| Chart (1987) | Peak position |
|---|---|
| U.S. Billboard Top Country Albums | 18 |
| U.S. Billboard 200 | 163 |
