= I Prefer the Moonlight (song) =

1987 single by Kenny Rogers

Single by Kenny Rogers

from the album I Prefer the Moonlight
- B-side: "We're Doin' Alright"
- Released: September 1987
- Genre: Country
- Length: 5:02
- Label: RCA Nashville
- Songwriter(s): Gary Chapman, Mark Wright
- Producer(s): Brown Bannister

Kenny Rogers singles chronology
"Make No Mistake, She's Mine" (1987)	"I Prefer the Moonlight" (1987)	"The Factory" (1988)

"I Prefer the Moonlight" is a song written by Gary Chapman and Mark Wright, and recorded by American country music artist Kenny Rogers as the title track of his 1987 album of the same name. The song featured Kim Carnes as a guest vocalist. It was released in September 1987 as the second single from the album and reached number 2 on the Billboard Hot Country Singles & Tracks chart.

== Chart performance ==
Chart (1987)	Peak position
US Hot Country Songs (Billboard)	2
Canadian RPM Country Tracks	2
