= All My Life (Kenny Rogers song) =

1983 single by Kenny Rogers

Single by Kenny Rogers

from the album We've Got Tonight
- B-side: "Farther I Go"
- Released: April 1983
- Genre: Country
- Length: 3:55
- Label: Liberty
- Songwriter(s): Dave Robbins, Jeff Silbar, Van Stephenson
- Producer(s): David Foster, Kenny Rogers

Kenny Rogers singles chronology
"We've Got Tonight" (1983)	"All My Life" (1983)	"Scarlet Fever" (1983)

"All My Life" is a song written by Dave Robbins, Jeff Silbar, and Van Stephenson, and recorded by American country music artist Kenny Rogers. It was released in April 1983 as the second single from his Platinum selling album We've Got Tonight. The song reached number 37 on the Billboard Hot 100 chart in mid-1983.

It also reached number 13 on the country chart and climbed to #2 on the A/C charts.

== Chart performance ==
Chart (1983)	Peak position
Canadian RPM Country Tracks	3
US Adult Contemporary (Billboard)	2
US Hot Country Songs (Billboard)	13
US Billboard Hot 100	37
