= Dear Me (Lorrie Morgan song) =

Single by Lorrie Morgan

from the album Leave the Light On
- B-side: "Eight Days a Week"
- Released: February 1989
- Genre: Country
- Length: 3:44
- Label: RCA Nashville
- Songwriters: Carson Whitsett; Scott Mateer
- Producer: Barry Beckett

Lorrie Morgan singles chronology
"Trainwreck of Emotion" (1988)	"Dear Me" (1989)	"Out of Your Shoes" (1989)

"Dear Me" is a song written by Carson Whitsett and Scott Mateer, and recorded by American country music artist Lorrie Morgan. It was released in February 1989 as the second single from her album Leave the Light On. The song reached #9 on the Billboard Hot Country Singles chart in July 1989.

== Chart performance ==
Chart (1989)	Peak position
Canada Country Singles (RPM)	12
US Hot Country Songs (Billboard)	9

=== Year-end charts ===
Chart (1989)	Position
US Country Songs (Billboard)	82
