= Christmas in America =

Christmas In America

Studio album by Kenny Rogers
- Released: 1989
- Recorded: 1989
- Studios: Digital Recorders and The Loft (Nashville, Tennessee)
- Genre: Christmas
- Length: 31:25
- Label: Reprise
- Producers: Jim Ed Norman; Eric Prestidge

Kenny Rogers chronology
Something Inside So Strong (1989)	Christmas In America (1989)	Love Is Strange (1990)

Rogers' Christmas chronology
Once Upon a Christmas (1984)	Christmas In America (1989)	The Gift (1996)

Professional ratings
Review scores
Source	Rating
Allmusic	link

Christmas In America is the twenty-second studio album and the third Christmas album by Kenny Rogers. It was released in 1989 by Reprise Records.

== Track listing ==
No.	Title	Writer(s)	Length
1.	"Christmas in America"	Dolly Parton	3:02
2.	"Winter Wonderland"	Felix Bernard; Richard Bernhard Smith	2:10
3.	"I'll Be Home for Christmas"	Kim Gannon; Walter Kent; Buck Ram	3:04
4.	"Silver Bells"	Ray Evans; Jay Livingston	3:56
5.	"Have Yourself a Merry Little Christmas"	Hugh Martin; Ralph Blane	3:27
6.	"Christmas in America" (reprise)	Parton	1:02
7.	"Joy to the World"	Isaac Watts; Lowell Mason	1:56
8.	"Away in a Manger"	Traditional	1:22
9.	"O Little Town of Bethlehem"	Phillip Brooks; Lewis Redner	2:41
10.	"God Rest Ye Merry Gentlemen"	Traditional	1:25
11.	"The First Noel"	William B. Sandys	2:42
12.	"Christmas in America" (segue)	Parton	0:21
13.	"What Child Is This?"	William Chatterton Dix; Traditional	1:50
14.	"Silent Night"	Franz Xaver Gruber; Joseph Mohr	2:27
Total length:			31:25

== Personnel ==
- Kenny Rogers – vocals
- Matt Rollings – acoustic piano
- Mike Lawler – synthesizers
- Larry Byrom – acoustic guitar
- Mark Casstevens – acoustic guitar
- Steve Gibson – electric guitars
- Michael Rhodes – bass
- Paul Leim – drums
- Farrell Morris – percussion
- Jim Horn – saxophones, flute
- Cindy Reynolds Wyatt – harp
- Bergen White – orchestral arrangements and conductor, arrangements (7–14), backing vocals
- Carl Gorodetzky – conductor, concertmaster
- The Nashville String Machine – orchestra
- Jim Ferguson – backing vocals
- Sherilyn Huffman – backing vocals
- Louis Nunley – backing vocals
- Lisa Silver – backing vocals
- Diane Vanette – backing vocals
- Dennis Wilson – backing vocals

== Production ==
- Jim Ed Norman – producer
- Eric Prestidge – producer, engineer, mixing, mastering
- Daniel Johnston – assistant engineer
- John Kunz – assistant engineer
- James Valentini – assistant engineer
- Glenn Meadows – mastering
- Masterfonics (Nashville, Tennessee) – mastering location
- Danny Kee – production assistant
- Laura LiPuma – art direction
- Virginia Team – art direction, design
- Beth Middleworth – design
- Larry Dixon – album photography
- Kelly Junkermann – photography of Kenny Rogers
- Ken Kragen – management

== Chart performance ==
Chart (1989)	Peak position
U.S. Billboard Top Country Albums	45
U.S. Billboard 200	119
U.S. Billboard Top Holiday Albums	12
