= Back Home Again (Kenny Rogers album) =

Studio album by Kenny Rogers
- Released: November 16, 1991
- Recorded: 1991
- Studio: The Soundshop and The Loft (Nashville, Tennessee); The Castle (Franklin, Tennessee); Conway Studios (Hollywood, California)
- Genre: Country
- Length: 32:38
- Label: Reprise
- Producer: Jim Ed Norman; Eric Prestidge

Kenny Rogers chronology
Love Is Strange (1990)	Back Home Again (1991)	If Only My Heart Had A Voice (1993)

Singles from Back Home Again
- 1. "If You Want to Find Love" Released: November 30, 1991

Professional ratings
Review scores
Source	Rating
AllMusic	3/5 stars

Back Home Again is the twenty-fourth studio album by American country music artist Kenny Rogers released on November 16, 1991. It was Rogers' last album to be released through Reprise Records. The album was Rogers' second album not to attain any certifications from the RIAA and only reached number 42 on the U.S. Country charts.

== Track listing ==
No.	Title	Writer(s)	Length
1.	"If You Want to Find Love"	Max D. Barnes, Skip Ewing, Kenny Rogers	3:08
2.	"Bed of Roses"	Rex Benson, Steve Gillette	3:40
3.	"Someone Must Feel Like a Fool Tonight"	Mike Dekle, Byron Hill	3:31
4.	"Two Good Reasons"	J.D. Miller, J.P. Pennington	2:52
5.	"Some Prisons Don't Have Walls"	Dekle, Hill	3:13
6.	"They Just Don't Make 'Em Like You Anymore"	Jimmy Webb	3:48
7.	"When You Were Loving Me"	Billy Kirsch, Zack Turner	2:54
8.	"Sunshine"	Mickey Newbury	3:07
9.	"I'll Be There for You"	Steve Glassmeyer, Gene Golden, Wood Newton	2:49
10.	"How Do I Break It to My Heart"	Chapin Hartford, Wendell Mobley, Trisha Yearwood	3:36

== Personnel ==
Compiled from liner notes.

Musicians

- Kenny Rogers – lead vocals
- Mike Lawler – synthesizers
- Phil Naish – keyboards, synthesizers, synth string arrangements
- Bobby Ogdin – acoustic piano, keyboards
- Hargus "Pig" Robbins – acoustic piano
- Steve Gibson – electric guitars, acoustic guitar, mandolin, mandola
- John Hug – acoustic guitar
- Biff Watson – acoustic guitar
- Hoot Hester – mandolin, mandola, fiddle
- Dan Dugmore – steel guitar
- Sonny Garrish – steel guitar
- Jay Dee Maness – steel guitar
- Michael Rhodes – bass
- Eddie Bayers – drums
- Paul Leim – drums
- Billy Thomas – drums
- Terry McMillan – harmonica, percussion
- Farrell Morris – marimbas
- Eric Prestidge – synth string arrangements
- Bergen White – string arrangements and conductor
- Carl Gorodetzky – string contractor and concertmaster
- The Nashville String Machine – strings
- Steve Glassmeyer – backing vocals
- Gene Golden – backing vocals
- Chris Harris – backing vocals
- Mark Heimermann – backing vocals
- Gary Janney – backing vocals, harmony vocals
- Dennis Locorriere – harmony vocals

Guest vocalists

- The Branson Brothers (tracks 1, 4)
- Linda Davis (tracks 1, 2, 5)
- Larry Stewart of Restless Heart (track 6)
- Rudy and Steve Gatlin of Larry Gatlin and the Gatlin Brothers (track 8)
- Terry McBride and Billy Thomas of McBride & the Ride (track 10)

== Production ==
- Jim Ed Norman – producer
- Eric Prestidge – producer, recording, mixing
- Robert Tassi – assistant engineer, production coordinator
- Mark Capps – recording assistant
- Mark Dewey – recording assistant
- John Dickson – recording assistant
- Mark Coddington – additional recording assistant
- Mark Nevers – additional recording assistant
- Brett Swain – mix assistant
- Don Cobb – digital multitrack editing
- Bernie Grundman – mastering at Bernie Grundman Mastering (Hollywood, California)
- Danny Kee – production coordinator
- Laura LiPuma Nash – art direction
- Beth Middleworth – design
- Peter LiPuma Nash – photography
- Ken Kragen – management

== Chart performance ==
Chart (1991)	Peak position
U.S. Billboard Top Country Albums	42
Canadian RPM Country Albums	32

== Singles ==
The first single released from this album was "If You Want To Find Love", which reached #11 in the U.S. and #12 in Canada. Two other singles, "Someone Must Feel Like A Fool Tonight" and "I'll Be There For You", did not chart.
