= When You Put Your Heart in It =

Single by Kenny Rogers

from the album Something Inside So Strong
- B-side: "When You Put Your Heart In It (Instrumental)"
- Released: August 13, 1988
- Genre: Country pop, adult contemporary
- Length: 3:41
- Label: Reprise
- Songwriters: Jimmy Dunne, Austin Roberts
- Producer: Jim Ed Norman

Kenny Rogers singles chronology
"The Factory" (1988)	"When You Put Your Heart in It" (1988)	"I Don't Call Him Daddy" (1988)

"When You Put Your Heart in It" is a song recorded by American country music artist Kenny Rogers. It was released in August 1988 as the first single from the album Something Inside So Strong. The song reached #26 on the Billboard Hot Country Singles & Tracks chart. The song was written by Jimmy Dunne and Austin Roberts.

== Usage in sports ==
The song was used during the final montages of the official Major League Baseball video of the 1991 World Series between the Minnesota Twins and the Atlanta Braves and in the closing montage of Hockey Night in Canada's coverage of the 1991 Stanley Cup Final between the Pittsburgh Penguins and the Minnesota North Stars.

== Chart performance ==
Chart (1988)	Peak position
US Hot Country Songs (Billboard)	26
US Adult Contemporary (Billboard)	17
Canadian RPM Country Tracks	16
