= If I Ever Fall in Love Again =

Single by Anne Murray and Kenny Rogers

from the album Greatest Hits Volume II and Something Inside So Strong
- B-side: "Just Another Woman in Love"
- Released: September 1989
- Genre: Country pop
- Length: 3:40
- Label: Capitol Nashville – 3602
- Songwriters: Steve Dorff; Gloria Sklerov
- Producers: Jim Ed Norman; Steve Dorff

Anne Murray singles chronology
"I'll Be Your Eyes" (1989)	"If I Ever Fall in Love Again" (1989)	"I'd Fall in Love Tonight" (1990)

Kenny Rogers singles chronology
"The Vows Go Unbroken (Always True to You)" (1989)	"If I Ever Fall in Love Again" (1989)	"Maybe" (1990)

"If I Ever Fall in Love Again" is a song written by Steve Dorff and Gloria Sklerov, and performed by Anne Murray and Kenny Rogers as a duet. The song reached number six on the Canadian Adult Contemporary chart and number nine on the Canadian Country chart when it was released in September 1989 as the first single from Murray's compilation album Greatest Hits Volume II and Roger's studio album Something Inside So Strong. The song was produced by Jim Ed Norman and Steve Dorff.

== Chart performance ==
Chart (1989)	Peak position
Canada Adult Contemporary (RPM)	6
Canada Country Singles (RPM)	9
US Hot Country Songs (Billboard)	28
