= The Vows Go Unbroken (Always True to You) =

Single by Kenny Rogers

from the album Something Inside So Strong
- B-side: "One Night"
- Released: August 26, 1989
- Genre: Country
- Length: 3:31
- Label: Reprise
- Songwriters: Gary Burr, Eric Kaz
- Producer: Jim Ed Norman

Kenny Rogers singles chronology
"(Something Inside) So Strong" (1989)	"The Vows Go Unbroken (Always True to You)" (1989)	"If I Ever Fall in Love Again" (1989)

"The Vows Go Unbroken (Always True to You)" is a song written by Gary Burr and Eric Kaz, and recorded by American country music artist Kenny Rogers. It was released in August 1989 as the third single from the album Something Inside So Strong.

The song reached number 8 on the Billboard Hot Country Singles & Tracks chart.

== Chart performance ==
Chart (1989)	Peak position
Canada Country Singles (RPM)	26
US Hot Country Songs (Billboard)	8
