= Something Inside So Strong =

Studio album by Kenny Rogers
- Released: 1989
- Recorded: 1988/1989
- Studio: Sixteenth Avenue Sound, Audio Media Recorders, Digital Recorders, The Loft and MasterMix (Nashville, Tennessee); Sound Cell Recording Studios (Huntsville, Alabama); Bill Schnee Studios (North Hollywood, California); Manta Sound (Toronto, Ontario, Canada)
- Genre: Country, country pop
- Length: 44:52
- Label: Reprise
- Producer: Jim Ed Norman; Steve Dorff

Kenny Rogers chronology
Greatest Hits (1988)	Something Inside So Strong (1989)	Christmas in America (1989)

Singles from Something Inside So Strong
- 1. "When You Put Your Heart in It" Released: August 13, 1988; 2. "Planet Texas" Released: May 27, 1989; 3. "The Vows Go Unbroken (Always True to You)" Released: August 26, 1989; 4. "If I Ever Fall in Love Again" Released: September 30, 1989; 5. "Maybe" Released: February 17, 1990

Something Inside So Strong is the twenty-first studio album by American country music singer Kenny Rogers, released in 1989. The album includes the singles "When You Put Your Heart in It", "Planet Texas", "The Vows Go Unbroken", "Something Inside So Strong", and "Maybe". Gladys Knight, Anne Murray, Holly Dunn, and Ronald Isley are featured as duet partners. Jim Ed Norman produced the album, with additional production from Steve Dorff on "If I Ever Fall in Love Again".

== Track listing ==
No.	Title	Writer(s)	Length
1.	"Planet Texas"	John Andrew Parks III	4:53
2.	"(Something Inside) So Strong"	Labi Siffre	5:00
3.	"If I Knew Then (What I Know Now)" (featuring Gladys Knight)	Richard Butler, Robert Byrne	3:54
4.	"One Night"	Mike Reid, Troy Seals	4:38
5.	"There Lies the Difference"	Pat Bunch, Steve Dorff	4:23
6.	"If I Ever Fall in Love Again" (featuring Anne Murray)	Dorff, Gloria Sklerov	3:36
7.	"When You Put Your Heart in It"	James Patrick Dunne, Austin Roberts	3:41
8.	"The Vows Go Unbroken (Always True to You)"	Gary Burr, Eric Kaz	3:31
9.	"Maybe" (featuring Holly Dunn)	Bill Rice, Sharon Vaughn	3:29
10.	"Love the Way You Do" (featuring Ronald Isley)	Kye Fleming, Richard Kerr	7:49

== Personnel ==
Musicians

- Kenny Rogers – vocals
- Matt Rollings – acoustic piano (1, 4–9)
- John Barlow Jarvis – acoustic piano (3)
- Jim Ed Norman – acoustic piano (10)
- David Innis – synthesizers (1, 4, 7, 10)
- Phil Naish – synthesizers (1–6, 9, 10)
- Dennis Burnside – synthesizers (2, 8)
- Mike Lawler – synthesizers (3, 4, 7–10)
- Shane Keister – synthesizers (4)
- Edgar Struble – synthesizers (5)
- Randy Kerber – synthesizers (6)
- Carl Marsh – synthesizers (7)
- Steve Gibson – guitars, acoustic guitar (8)
- Michael Landau – guitars (6)
- Dean Parks – guitars (6)
- Mark Casstevens – acoustic guitar (8, 10)
- David Hungate – bass (1, 4)
- Michael Rhodes – bass (2, 6–8)
- Willie Weeks – bass (3)
- Mike Brignardello – bass (5, 9)
- Paul Leim – drums
- Jim Horn – saxophone (4, 10)

Background vocalists

- Mark Kibble – backing vocals (1, 4)
- Claude V. McKnight III – backing vocals (1, 2, 4)
- John Andrew Parks III – backing vocals (1)
- David Thomas – backing vocals (1, 2)
- Mervyn Warren – backing vocals (1, 2)
- Alvin Chea – backing vocals (2)
- Vicki Hampton – backing vocals (2)
- First Church Inspirational Choir – choir (2)
- Cleveland and Antoinette Wilson – choir conductors (2)
- Chris Harris – backing vocals (3–5, 7, 9, 10)
- Mark Heimerman – backing vocals (3–5, 10)
- Gary Janney – backing vocals (4, 5, 7, 9, 10)
- Steven Glassmeyer – backing vocals (5)
- Eugene Golden – backing vocals (5)
- Edgar Struble – backing vocals (5)
- Joe Chemay – backing vocals (6)
- Tony Sciuto – backing vocals (6)
- Terry Williams – backing vocals (6)
- Ricky Skaggs – backing vocals (8)
- Sharon White – backing vocals (8)

Duet vocalists

- Gladys Knight – vocals (3)
- Anne Murray – vocals (6)
- Holly Dunn – vocals (9)
- Ronald Isley – featured vocals (10)

== Production ==
- Jim Ed Norman – producer
- Steve Dorff – producer (6)
- Danny Kee – production assistant
- Laura LiPuma – art direction, design
- Empire Studio – front cover photography
- Kelly Junkerman – back cover photography
- David Skernick – background photography
- Ken Kragen – management

Technical credits

- Masterfonics (Nashville, Tennessee) – mastering location
- Glenn Meadows – mastering
- Eric Prestidge – engineer, mastering
- Daniel Johnston – assistant engineer
- James Valentini – assistant engineer
- Joel Bouchillon – additional recording assistant
- Scott Campbell – additional recording assistant
- Robert Charles – additional recording assistant
- Ken Friesen – additional recording assistant
- Jeff Giedt – additional recording assistant
- Lee Groitsch – additional recording assistant
- Brian Hardin – additional recording assistant
- Craig Hansen – additional recording assistant
- John Hurley – additional recording assistant
- John David Parker – additional recording assistant
- Hershey Reeves – additional recording assistant
- Doug Smith – additional recording assistant
- Bart Stevens – additional recording assistant
- Keith Odle – digital editing at GroundStar Laboratories (Nashville, Tennessee)

== Charts ==
=== Weekly charts ===
Chart (1989)	Peak position
Australian Albums (ARIA)	133
Canadian Country Albums (RPM)	13
Canadian Albums (RPM)	92
US Billboard 200	141
US Top Country Albums (Billboard)	10

=== Year-end charts ===
Chart (1989)	Position
US Top Country Albums (Billboard)	35
Chart (1990)	Position
US Top Country Albums (Billboard)	43

== Certifications ==
Region	Certification	Certified units/sales
United States (RIAA)	Gold	500,000^{^}
^{^} Shipments figures based on certification alone.
