= Greatest Hits Volume II (Anne Murray album) =

Greatest hits album by Anne Murray
- Released: September 18, 1989
- Recorded: 1981–1989
- Genre: Country
- Length: 33:57
- Label: Capitol
- Producers: Jerry Crutchfield Steve Dorff David Foster Jim Ed Norman

Anne Murray chronology
As I Am (1988)	Greatest Hits Volume II (1989)	You Will (1990)

Greatest Hits Volume II is a greatest hits album by Anne Murray issued in 1989. It is a collection of ten singles released between 1981 and 1989. "If I Ever Fall in Love Again", "When I Fall", and "I'd Fall in Love Tonight" were newly recorded for this album.

== Track listing ==
1. "Time Don't Run Out on Me" (Carole King, Gerry Goffin) - 3:44
2. "Just Another Woman in Love" (Patti Ryan, Wanda Mallette) - 2:57
3. "Now and Forever (You and Me)" (David Foster, Randy Goodrum, Jim Vallance) - 4:15
4. "I'd Fall in Love Tonight" (Naomi Martin, Mike Reid) - 3:14 [new recording]
5. "If I Ever Fall in Love Again" (duet with Kenny Rogers) (Steve Dorff, Gloria Sklerov) - 3:38 [new recording]
6. "A Little Good News" (Tommy Rocco, Charlie Black, Rory Bourke) - 3:09
7. "When I Fall" (Paul Overstreet, George Andrews) - 3:20 [new recording]
8. "Another Sleepless Night" (Black, Bourke) - 3:07
9. "Blessed Are the Believers" (Black, Bourke, Sandy Pinkard) - 2:41
10. "Nobody Loves Me Like You Do" (duet with Dave Loggins) (James Dunne, Pamela Phillips) - 3:52

== Personnel ==
- Anne Murray – vocals
- Kenny Rogers – vocals (5)
- Dave Loggins – vocals (10)

Production

- Balmur Limited – executive producers
- Jim Ed Norman – producer (1, 2, 5, 6, 8–10)
- David Foster – producer (3)
- Jerry Crutchfield – producer (4, 7)
- Steve Dorff – producer (5)
- Tommy Steele – art direction
- Matthew Wiley – photography
- Fujita & Associates – design
- Sheila Yakimov – hair stylist
- George Abbott – make-up artist
- Lee Kinoshita-Bevington – wardrobe designer
- Leonard T. Rambeau for Balmur Limited – management

== Chart performance ==
Chart (1989)	Peak position
Canadian RPM Top Albums	52
U.S. Billboard Top Country Albums	32
