= What About Me? (Kenny Rogers song) =

Single by Kenny Rogers with Kim Carnes and James Ingram

from the album What About Me?
- B-side: "The Rest of Last Night"
- Released: 1984
- Genre: Easy listening
- Length: 4:20
- Label: RCA
- Songwriters: Kenny Rogers, David Foster, Richard Marx
- Producers: David Foster, Kenny Rogers

Kenny Rogers singles chronology
"Evening Star" (1984)	"What About Me?" (1984)	"The Greatest Gift of All" (1985)

Kim Carnes singles chronology
"I Pretend" (1984)	"What About Me?" (1984)	"Make No Mistake, He's Mine" (1984)

James Ingram singles chronology
"Yah Mo B There" (1984)	"What About Me?" (1984)	"It's Your Night" (1984)

"What About Me?" is a 1984 song written by Kenny Rogers, producer David Foster, and singer-songwriter Richard Marx. It was recorded by Rogers, Kim Carnes, and James Ingram as a trio song from Rogers' Platinum certified 1984 album of the same name.

It was the lead single from Rogers' million selling LP and reached number 15 on the Billboard Hot 100 chart (Rogers' last Pop Top 40 hit in the United States until 1999's "Buy Me a Rose)". It hit the top spot on the American and Canadian Adult Contemporary charts and was Marx's first number one hit as a songwriter.

== Background and writing ==
Rogers has described "What About Me?" as "like a three-way love song...Everybody involved said 'Hey, what about me?' I think it's a beautiful record." Originally the male and female parts not sung by Rogers were to be performed by Lionel Richie and Barbra Streisand, but after Richie backed out of the project, Streisand did as well. The second proposed trio of singers was Rogers, Olivia Newton-John, and Jeffrey Osborne, but Newton-John began working on a duet with Barry Gibb of the Bee Gees and decided not to do both projects simultaneously. Osborne had a conflicting schedule as well, so the line-up of Rogers, Carnes, and Ingram was ultimately the one that recorded the song. The song was recorded by Rogers, Olivia Newton-John and Ingram at Sunset Sound in the Summer of 1984 – Carnes came on later for unknown reasons

== Charts ==
Chart (1984)	Peak position
Australian (Kent Music Report)	49
U.S. Billboard Hot 100	15
U.S. Billboard Adult Contemporary	1
U.S. Billboard Hot Country Singles	70
Canadian RPM Top Singles	18
Canadian RPM Adult Contemporary Tracks	1
Canadian RPM Country Tracks	25

== See also ==
- List of Hot Adult Contemporary number ones of 1984
