= Share Your Love =

1981 studio album by Kenny Rogers

Studio album by Kenny Rogers
- Released: 24 June 1981
- Recorded: 1981
- Studios: Concorde Recording, Los Angeles, California; Devonshire, Los Angeles, California
- Genre: Country
- Length: 36:28
- Label: Liberty
- Producer: Lionel Richie

Kenny Rogers chronology
Greatest Hits (1980)	Share Your Love (1981)	Christmas (1981)

Professional ratings
Review scores
Source	Rating
AllMusic	2.5/5 stars

Share Your Love is a studio album by country singer Kenny Rogers, released in 1981. Produced by Lionel Richie, it is also Rogers' first with Liberty Records besides his Greatest Hits album. The album has sold nine million copies worldwide.

== Recording ==
Rogers recorded portions of the album at Concorde Recording Center, where he had recorded his single "Lady", and purchased the recording studio in May 1981, before the album was completed. He later re-named the studio Lion Share Studios.

== Overview ==
Four singles were released from this Share Your Love. "I Don't Need You" charted at number one on the US and Canadian country charts as well as reaching the top of the US Adult Contemporary charts, and number three on the US Hot 100. The title cut "Share Your Love With Me" reached number 14 on the Hot 100 and five in the US Country charts, though it did reach number two in Canada and led the US Adult Contemporary charts. Rogers then took a break to release a single from his first Christmas album. "Blaze of Glory", which featured Kin Vassy on backing vocals, was also released as a single. Although it was a lesser hit than the first two singles, it still made the top ten. The final single, "Through The Years", returned Rogers to the very top by putting him at number one the Adult Contemporary charts once again.

The album reached number one on the country charts and number six on the pop charts, reaching platinum and double-platinum status in the US and Canada, respectively.

== Track listing ==
No.	Title	Writer(s)	Length
1.	"Blaze of Glory"	Danny Morrison, Johnny Slate, Larry Keith	2:37
2.	"I Don't Need You"	Rick Christian	3:27
3.	"The Good Life"	Lionel Richie	2:47
4.	"Makes Me Wonder If I Ever Said Goodbye"	Mickey Newbury	2:29
5.	"Through the Years"	Steve Dorff, Marty Panzer	4:44
6.	"Share Your Love with Me"	Al "TNT" Braggs, Deadric Malone	3:19
7.	"So in Love with You"	Richie	4:17
8.	"Goin' Back to Alabama"	Richie	5:04
9.	"Without You in My Life"	Richie, Thomas McClary	5:04
10.	"Grey Beard"	Kenny Rogers, Gene Golden, Kirby Stone	2:36

== Personnel ==
Compiled from liner notes.

Musicians

- Kenny Rogers – lead vocals, rhythm track arrangements (4)
- Reginald "Sonny" Burke – keyboards
- Barnaby Finch – keyboards
- Glen Hardin – keyboards
- John Hobbs – keyboards
- Lincoln Mayorga – keyboards (5)
- Sylvester Rivers – keyboards
- James Burton – guitars
- Rickey Harper – guitars
- Paul Jackson Jr. – guitars
- Russ Powell - guitars
- Darrell Jones – guitars
- Thomas McClary – guitars
- Ray Parker Jr. – guitars
- Fred Tackett – guitars
- Billy Joe Walker Jr. – guitars
- Dennis Belfield – bass (2)
- Joe Chemay – bass (1, 3, 7)
- Nathan East – bass (5)
- Abraham Laboriel – bass (6, 8, 9)
- Jerry Scheff – bass (10)
- Freddie Washington – bass (4)
- Ed Greene – drums
- Paul Leim – drums
- Rick Shlosser – drums (5)
- Eddie "Bongo" Brown – percussion
- Ollie E. Brown – percussion
- Paulinho da Costa – percussion (10)
- David Boruff – saxophone solo (2)
- Gary Herbig – saxophone solo (6)
- Gene Page – string, horn and rhythm arrangements
- Edgar Struble – string arrangements (2, 4)
- Harry Bluestone – concertmaster

Backing vocalists

- Track 1: Kin Vassy, Terry Williams, Gene Marford
- Track 2: Terry Williams, Kin Vassy, Cindy Fee, Juanice Charmain
- Track 3: Deborah Thomas, Kin Vassy, Terry Williams, Cindy Fee
- Track 4: Kin Vassy, Terry Williams, Cindy Fee
- Track 5: none
- Track 6: Gladys Knight & the Pips (Gladys Knight, William Guest, Merald "Bubba" Knight, Edward Patten), Lionel Richie
- Track 7: Lionel Richie, Terry Williams, Cindy Fee
- Track 8: Lionel Richie, Michael Jackson
- Track 9: Kin Vassy, Terry Williams, Deborah Thomas, Brooks Hunnicut
- Track 10: Lionel Richie, Terry Williams, Dorothy Sugarloaf

Technical

- Reginald Dozier – recording and mixing engineer
- Larry Ferguson – second engineer
- Bernie Grundman – mastering at Capitol Studios (Hollywood, CA).
- Michael Mancini – second engineer
- Brenda Harvey-Richie – assistant production
- Lionel Richie – producer
- Kenny Rogers – mixing engineer

Additional credits

- Bill Burks – art direction, design
- Roy R. Guzman – design
- Ken Kragen – management
- Gary Register – photography

== Charts ==
=== Weekly charts ===
Chart (1981–82)	Peak position
Australian Albums (Kent Music Report)	44
Canada Top Albums/CDs (RPM)	11
Finnish Albums (The Official Finnish Charts)	21
Norwegian Albums (VG-lista)	13
Swedish Albums (Sverigetopplistan)	37
US Billboard 200	6
US Top Country Albums (Billboard)	1

=== Year-end charts ===
Chart (1981)	Position
Canada Top Albums/CDs (RPM)	58
US Billboard 200	98
Chart (1982)	Position
US Billboard 200	62

== Certifications ==
Region	Certification	Certified units/sales
Canada (Music Canada)	2× Platinum	200,000^{^}
United States (RIAA)	Platinum	1,000,000^{^}
^{^} Shipments figures based on certification alone.
