= Through the Years (Kenny Rogers song) =

1981 single by Kenny Rogers

Single by Kenny Rogers

from the album Share Your Love
- B-side: "So in Love with You"
- Released: December 14, 1981
- Genre: Country pop
- Length: 4:44 (album version); 4:22 (single version)
- Label: Liberty
- Songwriter(s): Steve Dorff, Marty Panzer
- Producer(s): Lionel Richie

Kenny Rogers singles chronology
"Blaze of Glory" (1981)	"Through the Years" (1981)	"Love Will Turn You Around" (1982)

"Through the Years" is a song written by Steve Dorff and Marty Panzer, and recorded by American country music artist Kenny Rogers. It was released in December 1981 as the fourth and final single from the album Share Your Love.

"Through the Years" reached number 13 on the Billboard Hot 100 chart in early 1982, remaining in the top 40 for eleven weeks and went to number one on the Adult Contemporary chart, becoming Rogers' fifth single to top this chart. The song peaked at number five on the Country chart. Rogers credited "Through the Years" as being one of his career songs, though it had relatively little success in North America. Rogers appeared and performed the song at the 1983 Grammy Awards and at an April 2001 halftime ceremony honoring Charles Barkley at a Philadelphia 76ers game.

On his 50th anniversary TV special, Rogers performed a version of the song with his two friends Lionel Richie and Dolly Parton which also included archive footage of him working with both on various projects through the years.

== Content ==
The song looks back at a relationship "through the years" and mentions the ups and downs, but the singer proclaims to his loved one: I'm so glad I stayed right here with you / Through the years.

== Chart performance ==
Chart (1981–1982)	Peak position
Australia (Kent Music Report)	92
Canada RPM Country Tracks	5
US Hot Country Songs (Billboard)	5
US Billboard Hot 100	13
US Adult Contemporary (Billboard)	1

Year-end chart (1982)	Rank
US Top Pop Singles (Billboard)	99

== See also ==
- List of Billboard Adult Contemporary number ones of 1982
