= What About Me? (Kenny Rogers album) =

Studio album by Kenny Rogers
- Released: September 1984
- Recorded: 1984
- Studios: Lion Share Studios (Los Angeles, California); Ocean Way Recording and Sunset Sound (Hollywood, California); The Lighthouse (Hermosa Beach, California)
- Genre: Country
- Length: 40:03
- Label: RCA Victor
- Producers: Kenny Rogers; David Foster

Kenny Rogers chronology
| Eyes That See in the Dark (1983) | What About Me? (1984) | Once Upon a Christmas (1984) |

Singles from What About Me
- 1. "What About Me" Released: 1984; 2. "Crazy" Released: December 17, 1984

Professional ratings
Review scores
| Source | Rating |
|---|---|
| Allmusic | 2/5 stars |

What About Me? is the sixteenth studio album by American singer Kenny Rogers, released by RCA Records in 1984. The album's title track, "What About Me?", is sung in trio with R&B singer James Ingram and Kim Carnes, which reached number one on the AC charts and was also a pop and country hit, giving co-writer Richard Marx his first number one hit as a writer. Marx's second number one hit as a writer was the song "Crazy", which was included on the album.

Elsewhere on the album is "Two Hearts, One Love" by Byron Hill, and "Pickin' Up Strangers," released on Johnny Lee's Lookin' for Love album, and "The Stranger" (a story song in the vein of Rogers' previous hits such as "The Gambler" and "Lucille"), "The Night Goes On" (a R&B influenced ballad).

This album continued Rogers' long Platinum streak, quickly selling over a million copies.

== Track listing ==
| No. | Title | Writer(s) | Length |
|---|---|---|---|
| 1. | "What About Me?" (with Kim Carnes and James Ingram) | Kenny Rogers, David Foster, Richard Marx | 4:23 |
| 2. | "The Night Goes On" | Paul Gordon, Tom Keane | 4:35 |
| 3. | "Dream Dancin'" | Laura Allan, Robbie Long | 4:25 |
| 4. | "Two Hearts One Love" | Mike Dekle, Byron Hill | 3:36 |
| 5. | "I Don't Want to Know Why" (with Cindy Fee) | Guy Thomas | 4:06 |
| 6. | "Didn't We?" | Graham Lyle, Troy Seals | 3:55 |
| 7. | "Somebody Took My Love" | Marx, David Pomeranz | 3:52 |
| 8. | "Crazy" | Rogers, Marx | 3:43 |
| 9. | "The Stranger" | Dolly Parton | 3:46 |
| 10. | "Heart to Heart" | Richard Feldman, Jimmy Scott | 3:42 |

== Personnel ==
- Kenny Rogers – lead vocals, backing vocals
- Erich Bulling – keyboards, synthesizer programming
- Jimmy Cox – keyboards
- David Foster – keyboards, arrangements
- John Hobbs – keyboards
- Tom Keane – keyboards
- Randy Kerber – keyboards
- Marcus Ryle – keyboards, synthesizer programming
- Dann Huff – guitars
- Paul Jackson Jr. – guitars
- Michael Landau – guitars
- Fred Tackett – guitars
- Kin Vassy – guitars, backing vocals
- Billy Joe Walker Jr. – guitars
- Dennis Belfield – bass
- Joe Chemay – bass
- Nathan East – bass
- Neil Stubenhaus – bass
- Ed Greene – drums
- John Robinson – drums
- Sheila E. – percussion
- Steve Forman – percussion
- Michael Temple – percussion
- Gary Herbig – saxophone
- Jeremy Lubbock – string arrangements and conductor (3, 5, 8)
- Kim Carnes – lead and backing vocals (1)
- James Ingram – lead and backing vocals (1)
- Kenny Cetera – backing vocals
- Cindy Fee – backing vocals, lead vocals (5)
- Portia Griffin – backing vocals
- Richard Marx – backing vocals
- Herb Pedersen – backing vocals
- Kenny Rogers II – backing vocals
- Terry Williams – backing vocals

== Production ==
- Kenny Rogers – producer (1, 3–6, 9, 10)
- David Foster – producer (1, 2, 7, 8)
- Humberto Gatica – engineer, mixing
- Steve Crimmel – additional engineer
- Reginald Dozier – additional engineer
- Mark Ettel – additional engineer
- Larry Ferguson – additional engineer
- Tom Fouce – additional engineer
- John Guess – additional engineer
- Paul Lani – additional engineer
- David Leonard – additional engineer
- Laura Livingston – additional engineer
- Stephen Shelton – additional engineer
- Wally Traugott – mastering at Capitol Mastering (Hollywood, California)
- Marge Meoli – A&R coordinator
- Debbie Caponetta – production assistant
- John Coulter – art direction
- Mario Casilli – photography
- Reid Miles – photography
- Ken Kragen – management

== Charts ==
=== Weekly charts ===
| Chart (1984–1985) | Peak position |
|---|---|
| Australian Albums (Kent Music Report) | 30 |
| Canada Top Albums/CDs (RPM) | 26 |
| UK Albums (Official Charts) | 97 |
| US Billboard 200 | 31 |
| US Top Country Albums (Billboard) | 9 |

=== Year-end charts ===
| Chart (1985) | Position |
|---|---|
| US Top Country Albums (Billboard) | 32 |

== Further utilization ==
The song "The Night Goes On" was used as a love theme for the Eden Capwell and Cruz Castillo characters on the Santa Barbara TV series.
