= Blaze of Glory (Kenny Rogers song) =

Single by Kenny Rogers

from the album Share Your Love
- B-side: "The Good Life"
- Released: November 9, 1981
- Genre: Country
- Length: 2:31
- Label: Liberty
- Songwriters: Danny Morrison, Johnny Slate, Larry Keith
- Producer: Lionel Richie

Kenny Rogers singles chronology
| "Share Your Love with Me" (1981) | "Blaze of Glory" (1981) | "Through the Years" (1981) |

"Blaze of Glory" is a song written by Danny Morrison, Johnny Slate, and Larry Keith, and recorded by American country music artist Kenny Rogers. It was released in November 1981 as the third single (following "I Don't Need You" and "Share Your Love With Me") from the album Share Your Love. The song reached number 66 on the Billboard Hot 100 chart in early 1982. The song peaked at number nine on the country chart.

== Background and writing ==
Razzy Bailey originally cut the song to be a single, and right up until the last minute, Kenny Rogers' organization said there were no plans to release his version first. Apparently someone heard Razzy's cut on the song and rushed back to the Liberty Records to tell them it might be a hit. Rogers' version hit the charts first and Bailey's remained an album cut from Feelin' Right.

== Chart performance ==
| Chart (1981–1982) | Peak position |
|---|---|
| Australian (Kent Music Report) | 91 |
| Canadian RPM Country Tracks | 4 |
| U.S. Billboard Adult Contemporary | 25 |
| US Hot Country Songs (Billboard) | 9 |
| US Billboard Hot 100 | 66 |
