= Scarlet Fever (song) =

1983 single by Kenny Rogers

Single by Kenny Rogers

from the album We've Got Tonight
- B-side: "What I Learned From Loving You"
- Released: June 1983
- Genre: Country
- Length: 3:56
- Label: Liberty
- Songwriter(s): Mike Dekle
- Producer(s): Kenny Rogers

Kenny Rogers singles chronology
| "All My Life" (1983) | "Scarlet Fever" (1983) | "Islands in the Stream" (1983) |

"Scarlet Fever" is a song written by Mike Dekle, and recorded by American country music artist Kenny Rogers. It was released in June 1983 as the third single from the album We've Got Tonight. The song reached number 94 on the Billboard Hot 100 chart in mid-1983. The song peaked at number 5 on the country chart.

== Content ==
The lyrics describe the singer's infatuation with a 16-year-old dancer named Scarlet, whom he watches perform at a nightclub. Knowing that Scarlet isn't interested in him, the singer never speaks to her but only fantasizes that she will fall in love with him. One night, he arrives at the club and is heartbroken to find that Scarlet has left. He is unable to forget her and calls himself a fool for still getting "Scarlet Fever".

== Chart performance ==
| Chart (1983) | Peak position |
|---|---|
| Canadian RPM Country Tracks | 4 |
| US Hot Country Songs (Billboard) | 5 |
| US Billboard Hot 100 | 94 |
