= Love Is What We Make It =

Studio album by Kenny Rogers
- Released: March 15, 1985
- Recorded: 1974–83
- Genre: Country
- Length: 35:26
- Label: Liberty
- Producer: Larry Butler; Kenny Rogers; Lionel Richie

Kenny Rogers chronology
The Heart of the Matter (1985)	Love Is What We Make It (1985)	Short Stories (1985)

Professional ratings
Review scores
Source	Rating
AllMusic	2/5 stars

Love Is What We Make It is the eighteenth studio album by Kenny Rogers released in 1985. It was Rogers' final studio album released on Liberty Records. It is a collection of songs Rogers recorded between 1974 and 1983 that were rejected from his previous studio albums. The album was issued while was he signed to RCA Records.

The title track is a Top 40 hit in the Country and Adult Contemporary charts. "A Stranger in My Place" is a 1974 re-recording of his single with The First Edition.

== Track listing ==
Side A
No.	Title	Writer(s)	Length
1.	"Love Is What We Make It"	Stegall, Murrah	3:29
2.	"Twentieth Century Fool"	Neary, Photoglo	3:42
3.	"Still Hold On"	Ellingson, Carnes, Waldman	4:09
4.	"Tie Me to Your Heart Again"	Henley, Pippin	3:13
5.	"Maybe in the End"	Golden	3:48

Side B
No.	Title	Writer(s)	Length
6.	"It Turns Me Inside Out"	Crutchfield	3:08
7.	"It Happens in the Best of Dreams"	Wallace, Bell, Skinner	3:23
8.	"A Stranger in My Place"	Rogers, Vassy	2:57
9.	"Starting Today, Starting Over"	Hurt, Slate, Keith	3:47
10.	"Born to Love Me"	Morrison	3:50

== Charts ==
Album

Chart (1985)	Peak position
U.S. Billboard 200	145
U.S. Billboard Top Country Albums	17

Singles

Year	Single	Chart	Position
1985	"Love Is What We Make It"	U.S. Billboard Hot Country Songs	37
1985	"Love Is What We Make It"	U.S. Billboard Adult Contemporary	35
1985	"Twentieth Century Fool"	U.S. Billboard Hot Country Songs	57
