= Planet Texas =

Single by Kenny Rogers

from the album Something Inside So Strong
- B-side: "When You Put Your Heart in It"
- Released: May 27, 1989
- Genre: Country
- Length: 4:53
- Label: Reprise
- Songwriter: John Andrew Parks III
- Producer: Jim Ed Norman

Kenny Rogers singles chronology
"I Don't Call Him Daddy" (1988)	"Planet Texas" (1989)	"(Something Inside) So Strong" (1989)

"Planet Texas" is a song written by John Andrew Parks III, and recorded by American country music artist Kenny Rogers. It was released in May 1989 as the second single from the album Something Inside So Strong. The song reached #30 on the Billboard Hot Country Singles & Tracks chart.

== Content ==
The song tells the story of the narrator's encounter with extraterrestrials who take him on a journey through outer space. Upon returning to Earth, he asks the alien visitors of their origin; they reply they are from a planet called Texas, "the biggest place in outer space" (a nod to Texas' "larger than life" notoriety). Rogers described the song as "the most unique song" he had done in many years.

Julien Temple directed the song's music video, which features a number of special effects and cost over $600,000 to make.

== Chart performance ==
Chart (1989)	Peak position
Canada Country Singles (RPM)	11
US Hot Country Songs (Billboard)	30
