= Don't Fall in Love with a Dreamer =

1980 single by Kenny Rogers

Single by Kenny Rogers with Kim Carnes

from the album Gideon
- B-side: "Gideon Tanner"
- Released: March 1980
- Genre: Country, soft rock
- Length: 3:39
- Label: United Artists
- Songwriters: Kim Carnes; David Ellingson
- Producers: Larry Butler; Kenny Rogers

Kenny Rogers singles chronology
"Coward of the County" (1979)	"Don't Fall in Love with a Dreamer" (1980)	"Love the World Away" (1980)

"Don't Fall in Love with a Dreamer" is a song recorded by American singers Kenny Rogers and Kim Carnes, the latter of whom wrote the song with her husband David Ellingson. It was released in March 1980 as the first single from Rogers' album Gideon. It was also recorded in Spanish as "No Te Enamores De Un Loco". The song was the only duet from the album Gideon.

== Background ==
While recording the song in Nashville, Kenny Rogers and Kim Carnes sang facing each other with live musicians while Carnes had to improvise by singing the melody in a different key than she had prepared.

Rogers and Carnes performed the track live at the Fox Theatre in Atlanta, and it featured on the CBS TV special Kenny Rogers' America, broadcast on November 20, 1980.

== Critical reception ==
Record World said that the singers "exude an awesome emotional intensity".

== Charts ==
Chart (1980)	Peak position
Australia (Kent Music Report)	38
Canadian RPM Country Tracks	1
Canadian RPM Top Singles	3
Canadian RPM Adult Contemporary Tracks	1
New Zealand (Recorded Music NZ)	31
US Billboard Hot 100	4
US Adult Contemporary (Billboard)	2
US Hot Country Songs (Billboard)	3

Year-end chart (1980)	Peak position
US Top Pop Singles (Billboard)	31
