= Gideon (album) =

Studio album by Kenny Rogers
- Released: March 24, 1980
- Recorded: 1979–1980
- Studios: Jack Clement Recording (Nashville, Tennessee)
- Genre: Country
- Length: 34:05
- Label: United Artists Group
- Producers: Larry Butler, Kenny Rogers

Kenny Rogers chronology
Kenny (1979)	Gideon (1980)	Greatest Hits (1980)

Professional ratings
Review scores
Source	Rating
AllMusic	3/5 stars

Gideon is the ninth studio album by American singer Kenny Rogers. It was released by United Artists Records in 1980. The album hit #1 on the Country albums chart and #12 on the main Billboard album chart. It includes the worldwide hit "Don't Fall in Love with a Dreamer" (a duet with Kim Carnes, who co-wrote the entire album with her husband Dave Ellingson). Gideon was certified platinum by the RIAA.

Gideon is a concept album about a Texas cowboy, and all the songs stick to this theme. The album is a look back at his life in retrospect. In the first song "Gideon Tanner", it is known that Gideon is dead. This and most of the other songs are sung from the point of view of the character himself.

Although the album's only single release was "Don't Fall in Love with a Dreamer", the song "Saying Goodbye" was issued on the B-side of Rogers' top five hit single "Love the World Away".

== Track listing ==
All tracks are written by Kim Carnes and David M. Ellingson.

No.	Title	Length
1.	"Goin' Home to the Rock" (intro)	0:40
2.	"Gideon Tanner"	2:34
3.	"No Good Texas Rounder"	4:11
4.	"Don't Fall in Love with a Dreamer" (duet with Kim Carnes)	3:39
5.	"The Buckeroos"	3:16
6.	"You Were a Good Friend"	3:53
7.	"Call Me Up (The Phone Is in the Cradle)"	3:17
8.	"These Chains"	3:22
9.	"Somebody Help Me"	2:51
10.	"One Place in the Night"	2:59
11.	"Sayin' Goodbye"	3:25
12.	"Goin' Home to the Rock" (reprise)	0:58

== Personnel ==
- Kenny Rogers – lead vocals
- Larry Butler – acoustic piano
- Bill Cuomo – acoustic piano
- Steve Glassmeyer – acoustic piano, backing vocals
- Eugene Golden – acoustic piano, backing vocals
- Edgar Struble – clavinet, synthesizers, backing vocals, horn arrangements (7)
- Randy Dorman – guitar
- Patrick Harper – guitar
- Billy Sanford – guitar, dobro
- Chuck Jacobs – bass guitar
- Bobby Daniels – drums, backing vocals
- Jerry Carrigan – percussion
- Bill Justis – string arrangements
- The Sheldon Kurland Strings – strings
- Lea Jane Berinati – backing vocals
- Kim Carnes – backing vocals, lead vocals (4)
- James Cason – backing vocals
- David Ellingson – backing vocals
- Wendy Suits – backing vocals
- Dennis Wilson – backing vocals

== Production ==
- Producers – Larry Butler and Kenny Rogers
- Engineer – Billy Sherrill
- Mixing – Bill Schnee
- Recorded at Jack Clement Recording Studios (Nashville, TN)
- Mastered by Doug Sax at the Mastering Lab (Los Angeles, CA)
- Art direction – Bill Burks
- Cover and poster photos – Ken Kragen
- Back cover photo – Reid Miles

== Charts ==
=== Weekly charts ===
Weekly chart performance for Gideon
Chart (1980)	Peak position
Australian Albums (Kent Music Report)	31
Canada Country Albums (RPM)	1
Canada Top Albums/CDs (RPM)	5
New Zealand Albums (RMNZ)	48
US Billboard 200	12
US Top Country Albums (Billboard)	1

=== Year-end charts ===
Year-end chart performance for Gideon
Chart (1980)	Position
Canada Top Albums/CDs (RPM)	22
US Billboard 200	71

== Certifications and sales ==
Region	Certification	Certified units/sales
Canada (Music Canada)	2× Platinum	200,000^{^}
Japan	—	40,000
United States (RIAA)	Platinum	1,000,000^{^}
^{^} Shipments figures based on certification alone.
