= We've Got Tonight (Kenny Rogers album) =

Studio album by Kenny Rogers
- Released: February 11, 1983
- Studios: Lion Share Studios and Hitsville U.S.A. (Los Angeles, California); Ocean Way Recording (Hollywood, California); Creative Workshop (Nashville, Tennessee)
- Genre: Country
- Length: 36:15
- Label: Liberty
- Producers: Kenny Rogers; David Foster; Brent Maher; Randy Goodrum; Lionel Richie; James Anthony Carmichael

Kenny Rogers chronology
Love Will Turn You Around (1982)	We've Got Tonight (1983)	Eyes That See in the Dark (1983)

Singles from We've Got Tonight
- 1. "We've Got Tonight" Released: January 24, 1983; 2. "All My Life" Released: April 1983; 3. "Scarlet Fever" Released: June 1983

We've Got Tonight is the fourteenth studio album by American singer Kenny Rogers, released in 1983. It is also his last with Liberty Records before signing with RCA Records.

== Overview ==
The title cut, a duet with Sheena Easton, was the debut single and became one of Rogers' signature hits, soaring to No. 1 on the Country chart and No. 2 at Adult Contemporary radio. It also went Top Ten on the Billboard and Cash Box Pop charts.

There were two other singles: "All My Life", which hit #2 Adult Contemporary and #13 on the Country chart. It also reached third place in Canada; "Scarlet Fever", his final single for EMI, was a #5 Country hit but ran out of steam at #94 Pop.

The title of the album comes from its signature track, written by Bob Seger and originating from his album, Stranger in Town. By comparison with Rogers' version, Seger's only reached No. 13 on the Hot 100, making Rogers' version a higher-seller (at the time), five years after it was written.

"You Are So Beautiful" was written by Billy Preston and Bruce Fisher and originally appears on the 1974 Preston album The Kids and Me.

Lionel Richie, who by now had been contributing a reasonable number of songs to Rogers, submitted the track "How Long" to this album.

The album hit #3 on the country chart and reached #18 on the main Billboard album chart. It attained Platinum status in both the United States and Canada.

Professional ratings
Review scores
Source	Rating
Allmusic	link

== Track listing ==
No.	Title	Writer(s)	Length
1.	"We've Got Tonight" (with Sheena Easton)	Bob Seger	3:49
2.	"Scarlet Fever"	Mike Dekle	4:18
3.	"Farther I Go"	David MacKechnie, Kin Vassy	3:27
4.	"No Dreams"	Randy Goodrum	3:25
5.	"Bad Enough"	Dave Robbins, Jeff Silbar, Van Stephenson	3:14
6.	"All My Life"	Robbins, Silbar, Stephenson	3:49
7.	"How Long"	Lionel Richie	3:51
8.	"Love, Love, Love"	Dick St. Nicklaus	3:28
9.	"What I Learned from Loving You"	James Hooker, Russell Smith	3:50
10.	"You Are So Beautiful"	Bruce Fisher, Billy Preston	2:50

== Personnel ==
Musicians

- Kenny Rogers – lead vocals
- David Foster – keyboards (1, 6)
- John Hobbs – keyboards (2, 5, 10)
- Randy Goodrum – keyboards (4)
- Shane Keister – keyboards (4)
- Robbie Buchanan – synthesizers (7, 9)
- Michael Lang – keyboards (7, 9)
- Clarence McDonald – keyboards (7, 9)
- Reginald "Sonny" Burke – keyboards (8)
- Marty Walsh – guitars (1)
- Tim May – guitars (2, 7, 9)
- Fred Tackett – guitars (2, 10)
- Kin Vassy – guitars (2, 3)
- Billy Joe Walker Jr. – guitars (3)
- Terry Williams – guitars (3)
- Richie Zito – guitars (3, 5)
- Jon Goin – guitars (4)
- Steve Lukather – guitars (6)
- Carlos Rios – guitars (7, 9)
- Paul Jackson Jr. – guitars (8, 9)
- David T. Walker – guitars (8)
- Nathan East – bass (1, 8)
- Joe Chemay – bass (2, 5–7, 9)
- Trey Thompson – bass (3)
- Jack Williams – bass (4)
- Emory Gordy Jr. – bass (10)
- Mike Baird – drums (1, 6)
- Paul Leim – drums (2, 5, 7, 9, 10), percussion (2)
- Ress Williams – drums (3)
- Kenny Malone – drums (4)
- Leon "Ndugu" Chancler – drums (8)
- Gary Herbig – oboe (10)
- Jeremy Lubbock – string arrangements and conductor (1, 6)
- Bergen White – string arrangements (4)
- Sheldon Kurland – strings (4)

Background and guest vocalists

- Sheena Easton – lead vocals (1)
- Joe Chemay – backing vocals (2, 3, 5, 6)
- Kin Vassy – backing vocals (2, 3, 5, 7, 8, 10)
- Terry Williams – backing vocals (2–8, 10)
- Randy Goodrum – backing vocals (4)
- Kenny Rogers – backing vocals (4, 5)
- Dorothy Newton – backing vocals (5)
- David Foster – backing vocals (6)
- Juanice Charmaine – backing vocals (7, 8)
- Lionel Richie – backing vocals (7)
- Cindy Fee – backing vocals (10)

== Production ==
- Kenny Rogers – producer (1–3, 5, 6, 8–10)
- David Foster – producer (1, 6)
- Randy Goodrum – producer (4)
- Brent Maher – producer (4)
- Lionel Richie – producer (7, 8)
- James Anthony Carmichael – producer (7, 9)
- Henry Marquez – art direction
- Roy R. Guzman – graphic coordinator, sleeve design
- Matthew Rolston – photography
- Neiman Marcus – wardrobe
- Ken Kragen – management

Technical credits

- Doug Sax – mastering at The Mastering Lab (Hollywood, California)
- Humberto Gatica – engineer (1, 6, 9), mixing (1)
- Al Schmitt – engineer (1, 6, 8–10), mixing (3)
- Reginald Dozier – engineer (2, 3, 5, 8, 10), mixing (5)
- Bob Bullock – mixing (2), engineer (9)
- Brent Maher – engineer (4)
- Calvin Harris – engineer (7, 9), mixing (7)
- Stephen Schmitt – second engineer (1, 4, 5, 10), engineer (3)
- Larry Ferguson – second engineer (2)

== Charts ==
=== Weekly charts ===
Chart (1983)	Peak position
Australian Albums (Kent Music Report)	49
Canada Top Albums/CDs (RPM)	19
Norwegian Albums (VG-lista)	13
US Billboard 200	18
US Top Country Albums (Billboard)	3

=== Year-end charts ===
Chart (1983)	Peak position
Canada Top Albums/CDs (RPM)	64
US Billboard 200	97
US Top Country Albums (Billboard)	27

== Certifications ==
Region	Certification	Certified units/sales
Canada (Music Canada)	Platinum	100,000^{^}
United States (RIAA)	Platinum	1,000,000^{^}
^{^} Shipments figures based on certification alone.
