= Larry Gatlin discography =

- Studio albums: 22
- Live albums: 2
- Compilation albums: 9
- Singles: 51
- No.1 Single: 5

This article presents the discography of American country music singer-songwriter Larry Gatlin.

== Studio albums ==
Title	Details	Peak chart positions
Title	Details	US Country
The Pilgrim	Release date: 1973; Label: Monument Records	33
Rain / Rainbow	Release date: 1974; Label: Monument Records	37
High Time	Release date: 1975; Label: Monument Records	14
Larry Gatlin with Family and Friends^{[A]}	Release date: 1976; Label: Monument Records	24
Love Is Just a Game	Release date: 1977; Label: Monument Records	7
Oh Brother	Release date: 1978; Label: Monument Records	7
In My Life	Release date: July 28, 1998; Label: Spring Hill Records	
"—" denotes releases that did not chart

=== Larry Gatlin and the Gatlin Brothers ===
==== 1970s–1980s ====
Title	Details	Peak chart positions		Certifications (sales thresholds)
Title	Details	US Country	CAN Country	Certifications (sales thresholds)
Straight Ahead	Release date: 1979; Label: Columbia Records	7	5	US: Platinum
Help Yourself	Release date: 1980; Label: Columbia Records	11	13	
Not Guilty	Release date: 1981; Label: Columbia Records	10	—	
Sure Feels Like Love	Release date: 1982; Label: Columbia Records	18	—	
Houston to Denver	Release date: 1984; Label: Columbia Records	9	7	
Smile	Release date: 1985; Label: Columbia Records	35	—	
Partners	Release date: 1986; Label: Columbia Records	13	—	
Alive & Well…Livin' in the Land of Dreams…	Release date: 1988; Label: Columbia Records	46	—	
Pure 'n Simple	Release date: 1989; Label: Universal	49	—	
"—" denotes releases that did not chart

==== 1990s–2010s ====
Title	Details
Cookin' Up a Storm	Release date: 1990; Label: Capitol Nashville
Greatest Hits Encore	Release date: 1991; Label: Capitol Nashville
Adios	Release date: 1992; Label: Liberty Records
Moments to Remember	Release date: 1993; Label: Branson Entertainment
Cool Water	Release date: 1994; Label: Intersound
Gospel	Release date: 1996; Label: Arrival
Sing Their Family Gospel Favorites	Release date: 2004; Label: Dualtone Records
Pilgrimage	Release date: September 15, 2009; Label: Curb Records
The Gospel According to Gatlin	Release date: November 6, 2015; Label: Curb Records

== Compilation albums ==
Title	Details	Peak chart positions		Certifications (sales thresholds)
Title	Details	US Country	CAN Country	Certifications (sales thresholds)
Larry Gatlin's Greatest Hits	Release date: 1978; Label: Monument Records	10	10	US: Gold
Greatest Hits	Release date: 1980; Label: Columbia Records	22	—	
Greatest Hits Vol. II	Release date: 1983; Label: Columbia Records	22	—	
17 Greatest Hits	Release date: 1985; Label: Columbia Records	—	—	
Biggest Hits	Release date: 1988; Label: Columbia Records	—	—	
All the Gold	Release date: 1991; Label: Sony Music Special Products	—	—	
Super Hits	Release date: 1998; Label: Columbia Records	—	—	
16 Biggest Hits	Release date: 2000; Label: Columbia Records	—	—	
"—" denotes releases that did not chart

== Christmas albums ==
Title	Details	Peak positions
Title	Details	US Country
A Gatlin Family Christmas	Release date: 1982; Label: Columbia Records	40
Christmas with the Gatlins	Release date: 1990; Label: Capitol Records	—
"—" denotes releases that did not chart

== Live albums ==
=== Larry Gatlin and the Gatlin Brothers ===
Title	Details
Live at 8:00 pm	Release date: 1990; Label: Capitol Nashville
Live at Billy Bob's Texas	Release date: 2004; Label: Smith Music Group

== Singles ==
Year	Single	Peak chart positions				Album
Year	Single	US Country	US	US AC	CAN Country	Album
1973	"Sweet Becky Walker"	40	—	—	—	The Pilgrim
1974	"Bitter They Are Harder They Fall"	45	—	—	47	The Pilgrim
1974	"Delta Dirt"	14	84	—	15	Rain / Rainbow
1975	"Let's Turn the Lights On"	71	—	—	—	—N/a
1975	"Broken Lady"	5	—	—	5	With Family and Friends
1976	"Warm and Tender"	43	—	—	—	With Family and Friends
1976	"Statues Without Hearts"	5	—	—	4	High Time
1977	"Anything but Leavin'"	12	—	—	23	Love Is Just a Game
1977	"I Don't Wanna Cry"	3	—	—	—	Love Is Just a Game
1977	"Love Is Just a Game"	3	—	—	6	Love Is Just a Game
1978	"I Just Wish You Were Someone I Love"	1	—	—	3	Love Is Just a Game
1978	"Night Time Magic"	2	—	50	1	Oh Brother
1978	"Do It Again Tonight"	13	—	—	3	Oh Brother
1978	"I've Done Enough Dyin' Today"	7	—	—	5	Oh Brother
"—" denotes releases that did not chart

=== Larry Gatlin and the Gatlin Brothers ===
==== 1970s–1990s ====
Year	Single	Peak chart positions				Album
Year	Single	US Country	US	US AC	CAN Country	Album
1979	"All the Gold in California"	1	—	—	2	Straight Ahead
1979	"The Midnight Choir"	43	—	—	57	Straight Ahead
1980	"Taking Somebody with Me When I Fall"	12	108	36	15	Straight Ahead
1980	"We're Number One"	18	—	—	15	Straight Ahead
1980	"Take Me to Your Lovin' Place"	5	—	—	12	Help Yourself
1981	"It Don't Get No Better Than This"	25	—	—	21	Help Yourself
1981	"Wind Is Bound to Change"	20	—	—	—	Help Yourself
1981	"What Are We Doin' Lonesome"	4	—	—	28	Not Guilty
1982	"In Like with Each Other"	15	—	—	12	Not Guilty
1982	"She Used to Sing on Sunday"	19	—	—	21	Not Guilty
1982	"Sure Feels Like Love"	5	—	—	1	Sure Feels Like Love
1983	"Almost Called Her Baby by Mistake"	20	—	—	16	Sure Feels Like Love
1983	"Easy on the Eye"	32	—	—	—	Sure Feels Like Love
1983	"Houston (Means I'm One Day Closer to You)"	1	—	—	1	Houston to Denver
1984	"Denver"	7	—	—	5	Houston to Denver
1984	"The Lady Takes the Cowboy Everytime"	3	—	—	2	Houston to Denver
1985	"Runaway Go Home"	43	—	—	38	Smile
1986	"Nothing but Your Love Matters"	12	—	—	9	Smile
1986	"She Used to Be Somebody's Baby"	2	—	—	3	Partners
1986	"Talkin' to the Moon"	4	—	—	3	Partners
1987	"From Time to Time (It Feels Like Love Again)" (with Janie Fricke)	21	—	—	22	Partners
1987	"Changin' Partners"	16	—	—	30	Partners
1988	"Love of a Lifetime"	4	—	—	3	Alive & Well…Livin' in the Land of Dreams…
1988	"Alive and Well"	34	—	—	*	Alive & Well…Livin' in the Land of Dreams…
1989	"When She Holds Me"	54	—	—	*	Pure 'n Simple
1989	"I Might Be What You're Looking For"	37	—	—	—	Pure 'n Simple
1989	"#1 Heartache Place"	51	—	—	82	Pure 'n Simple
1990	"Boogie and Beethoven"	65	—	—	53	Cookin' Up a Storm
1990	"Country Girl Heart"	—	—	—	91	Cookin' Up a Storm
1992	"Pretty Woman Have Mercy"	—	—	—	—	Adios
"—" denotes releases that did not chart * denotes unknown peak positions

==== 2000s–2010s ====
Year	Single	Album
2009	"Johnny Cash Is Dead (And His House Burned Down)"	Pilgrimage
2009	"Sweet Becky Walker"	Pilgrimage
2010	"Penny Annie"	Pilgrimage
2010	"If I Ever See Utah"	Pilgrimage
2011	"Black Gold"	Pilgrimage
2011	"Americans, That's Who"	Pilgrimage
2014	"An American with a Remington"	The Gospel According to Gatlin
2016	"Stand Up and Say So"	—N/a

== Notes ==
- A Larry Gatlin with Family and Friends was released as Broken Lady in the United Kingdom.

== Music videos ==
Year	Video
1984	"Denver"
1984	"The Lady Takes the Cowboy Everytime"
1985	"Runaway Go Home"
1986	"Talkin' To The Moon"
1987	"From Time To Time (It Feels Like Love Again)"
1989	"I Might Be What You're Lookin' For"
1990	"Boogie And Beethoven"
2009	"Johnny Cash Is Dead (And His House Burned Down)"
