= Grammy Award for Best Country Performance by a Duo or Group with Vocal =

American music award

- Awarded for: Quality vocal country music duo or group performance
- Country: United States
- Presented by: National Academy of Recording Arts and Sciences
- First award: 1970
- Final award: 2011

Highlights
- Most wins: Dixie Chicks and The Judds (5 each)
- Most nominations: Alabama and Brooks & Dunn (12 each)
- Website: grammy.com

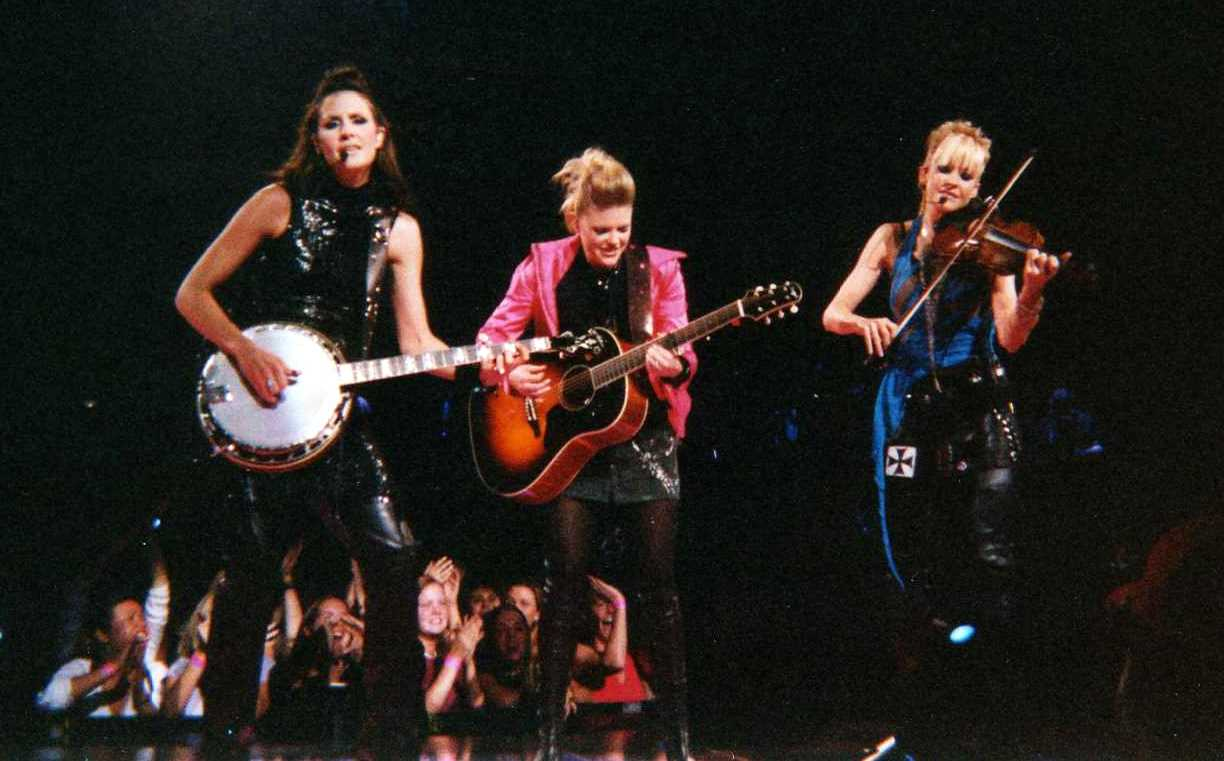
Dixie Chicks in concert in Madison Square Garden (20 June 2003)

The Grammy Award for Best Country Performance by a Duo or Group with Vocal was awarded from 1970 to 2011. The award has had several minor name changes:

- In 1970 the award was known as Best Country Performance by a Duo or Group
- From 1971 to 1981 it was awarded as Best Country Vocal Performance by a Duo or Group
- From 1982 to 2011 it was awarded as Best Country Performance by a Duo or Group with Vocal

The award was discontinued after the 2011 Grammy Awards in a major overhaul of Grammy categories. Since 2012, all duo or group performances in the country category were shifted to the newly formed Best Country Duo/Group Performance category.

Years reflect the year in which the Grammy Awards were presented, for works released in the previous year.

== Recipients ==
=== 1970s ===
Year	Artist	Work
1970	Waylon Jennings and the Kimberlys	"MacArthur Park"
1970	Tompall & the Glaser Brothers	"California Girl"
1970	Porter Wagoner and Dolly Parton	"Just Someone I Used to Know"
1970	Dottie West and Don Gibson	"Ring of Gold"
1970	Jack Greene and Jeannie Seely	"Wish I Didn't Have to Miss You"
1971	Johnny Cash and June Carter	"If I Were a Carpenter"
1971	The Statler Brothers	"Bed of Rose's"
1971	Porter Wagoner and Dolly Parton	"Daddy Was an Old-Time Preacher Man"
1971	Waylon Jennings and Jessi Colter	"Suspicious Minds"
1971	Jack Blanchard and Misty Morgan	"Tennessee Bird Walk"
1972	Conway Twitty and Loretta Lynn	"After the Fire Is Gone"
1972	Porter Wagoner and Dolly Parton	"Better Move It on Home"
1972	Roy Acuff with Nitty Gritty Dirt Band	"I Saw the Light"
1972	Johnny Cash and June Carter	"No Need to Worry"
1972	Tompall & the Glaser Brothers	"Rings"
1973	The Statler Brothers	"The Class of '57"
1973	Johnny Cash and June Carter	"If I Had a Hammer"
1973	Conway Twitty and Loretta Lynn	Lead Me On
1973	George Jones and Tammy Wynette	"Take Me"
1973	Nitty Gritty Dirt Band	Will the Circle Be Unbroken
1974	Kris Kristofferson and Rita Coolidge	"From the Bottle to the Bottom"
1974	The Statler Brothers	Carry Me Back
1974	Dolly Parton and Porter Wagoner	"If Teardrops Were Pennies"
1974	Conway Twitty and Loretta Lynn	"Louisiana Woman, Mississippi Man"
1974	Tammy Wynette and George Jones	"We're Gonna Hold On"
1975	The Pointer Sisters	"Fairytale"
1975	Willie Nelson and Tracy Nelson	"After the Fire Is Gone"
1975	Bobby Bare and Bobby Bare Jr.	"Daddy What If"
1975	Kris Kristofferson and Rita Coolidge	"Loving Arms"
1975	The Statler Brothers	"Whatever Happened to Randolph Scott"
1976	Kris Kristofferson and Rita Coolidge	"Lover Please"
1976	Conway Twitty and Loretta Lynn	"Feelins'"
1976	The Statler Brothers	"I'll Go to My Grave Loving You"
1976	The Pointer Sisters	"Live Your Life Before You Die"
1976	Asleep at the Wheel	Texas Gold
1977	Amazing Rhythm Aces	"The End Is Not in Sight (The Cowboy Tune)"
1977	George Jones and Tammy Wynette	"Golden Ring"
1977	Asleep at the Wheel	"Route 66"
1977	Loretta Lynn and Conway Twitty	"The Letter"
1977	The Statler Brothers	"Your Picture in the Paper"
1978	The Kendalls	"Heaven's Just a Sin Away"
1978	Loretta Lynn and Conway Twitty	Dynamic Duo
1978	George Jones and Tammy Wynette	"Near You"
1978	Asleep at the Wheel	The Wheel
1978	The Oak Ridge Boys	"Y'all Come Back Saloon"
1979	Waylon Jennings and Willie Nelson	"Mammas Don't Let Your Babies Grow Up to Be Cowboys"
1979	Kenny Rogers and Dottie West	"Anyone Who Isn't Me Tonight"
1979	The Oak Ridge Boys	"Cryin' Again"
1979	The Statler Brothers	"Do You Know You Are My Sunshine"
1979	Jim Ed Brown and Helen Cornelius	"If the World Ran Out of Love Tonight"
1979	Charlie Rich and Janie Fricke	"On My Knees"

=== 1980s ===
Year	Artist	Work
1980	Charlie Daniels Band	"The Devil Went Down to Georgia"
1980	The Bellamy Brothers	"If I Said You Had a Beautiful Body Would You Hold It Against Me"
1980	Larry Gatlin & the Gatlin Brothers Band	"All the Gold in California"
1980	Willie Nelson and Leon Russell	"Heartbreak Hotel"
1980	Kenny Rogers and Dottie West	"All I Ever Need Is You"
1981	Emmylou Harris and Roy Orbison	"That Lovin' You Feelin Again"
1981	Charlie Daniels Band	"In America"
1981	Larry Gatlin & the Gatlin Brothers Band	"Take Me to Your Lovin' Place"
1981	The Oak Ridge Boys	"Heart of Mine"
1981	Tanya Tucker and Glen Campbell	"Dream Lover"
1982	The Oak Ridge Boys	"Elvira"
1982	Alabama	Feels So Right
1982	David Frizzell and Shelly West	"You're the Reason God Made Oklahoma"
1982	Emmylou Harris and Don Williams	"If I Needed You"
1982	Dottie West and Kenny Rogers	"What Are We Doin' in Love"
1983	Alabama	Mountain Music
1983	Waylon Jennings and Willie Nelson	"(Sittin' on) The Dock of the Bay"
1983	The Oak Ridge Boys	Bobbie Sue
1983	Gram Parsons and Emmylou Harris	"Love Hurts"
1983	The Whites	You Put the Blue in Me
1984	Alabama	The Closer You Get...
1984	Larry Gatlin & the Gatlin Brothers Band	"Houston (Means I'm One Day Closer to You)"
1984	Merle Haggard and Willie Nelson	"Pancho and Lefty"
1984	Willie Nelson and Waylon Jennings	Take It to the Limit
1984	The Oak Ridge Boys	American Made
1985	The Judds	"Mama He's Crazy"
1985	Alabama	"If You're Gonna Play in Texas (You Gotta Have a Fiddle in the Band)"
1985	Barbara Mandrell and Lee Greenwood	"To Me"
1985	Anne Murray and Dave Loggins	"Nobody Loves Me Like You Do"
1985	Willie Nelson and Julio Iglesias	"As Time Goes By"
1986	The Judds	Why Not Me
1986	Alabama	"Can't Keep a Good Man Down"
1986	Forester Sisters	The Forester Sisters
1986	Waylon Jennings, Willie Nelson, Johnny Cash and Kris Kristofferson	"Highwayman"
1986	Marie Osmond and Dan Seals	"Meet Me in Montana"
1986	Dolly Parton and Kenny Rogers	"Real Love"
1987	The Judds	"Grandpa (Tell Me 'Bout the Good Ol' Days)"
1987	Alabama	"She and I"
1987	The Everly Brothers	Born Yesterday
1987	Larry Gatlin & the Gatlin Brothers Band	"She Used to Be Somebody's Baby"
1987	Carl Perkins, Johnny Cash, Jerry Lee Lewis and Roy Orbison	Class of '55
1988	Emmylou Harris, Dolly Parton and Linda Ronstadt	Trio
1988	The Desert Rose Band	The Desert Rose Band
1988	The Judds	Heartland
1988	O'Kanes	"Can't Stop My Heart from Loving You"
1988	Restless Heart	"I'll Still Be Loving You"
1989	The Judds	"Give a Little Love"
1989	Forester Sisters	Sincerely
1989	Highway 101	101²
1989	The Oak Ridge Boys	"Gonna Take a Lot of River"
1989	Restless Heart	Big Dreams in a Small Town

=== 1990s ===
Year	Artist	Work
1990	Nitty Gritty Dirt Band	Will the Circle Be Unbroken: Volume Two
1990	The Desert Rose Band	"She Don't Love Nobody"
1990	Highway 101	"Honky Tonk Heart"
1990	The Judds	"Young Love (Strong Love)"
1990	Restless Heart	"Big Dreams in a Small Town"
1991	The Kentucky Headhunters	Pickin' on Nashville
1991	Alabama	"Jukebox in My Mind"
1991	The Judds	Love Can Build a Bridge
1991	Restless Heart	"Fast Movin' Train"
1991	Shenandoah	"Ghost in This House"
1992	The Judds	"Love Can Build a Bridge"
1992	Alabama	"Forever's as Far as I'll Go"
1992	Diamond Rio	"Meet in the Middle"
1992	Forester Sisters	"Men"
1992	The Kentucky Headhunters	Electric Barnyard
1992	Texas Tornados	Zone of Our Own
1993	Emmylou Harris and the Nash Ramblers	At the Ryman
1993	Alabama	American Pride
1993	Brooks & Dunn	"Boot Scootin' Boogie"
1993	The Kentucky Headhunters	"Only Daddy That'll Walk the Line"
1993	Restless Heart	"When She Cries"
1994	Brooks & Dunn	"Hard Workin' Man"
1994	Confederate Railroad	"Trashy Women"
1994	Diamond Rio	"In a Week or Two"
1994	Little Texas	"God Blessed Texas"
1994	Sawyer Brown	"All These Years"
1995	Asleep at the Wheel and Lyle Lovett	"Blues for Dixie"
1995	Diamond Rio	"Love a Little Stronger"
1995	Alison Krauss & Union Station	"When You Say Nothing at All"
1995	The Mavericks	"What a Crying Shame"
1995	The Tractors	"Baby Likes to Rock It"
1996	The Mavericks	"Here Comes the Rain"
1996	Brooks & Dunn	"You're Gonna Miss Me When I'm Gone"
1996	Little Texas	"Amy's Back in Austin"
1996	Shenandoah	"Darned If I Don't (Danged If I Do)"
1996	The Tractors	"Tryin' to Get to New Orleans"
1997	Brooks & Dunn	"My Maria"
1997	BR5-49	"Cherokee Boogie"
1997	Diamond Rio	"That's What I Get for Lovin' You"
1997	The Mavericks	"All You Ever Do Is Bring Me Down"
1997	Texas Tornados	"Little Bit Is Better Than Nada"
1998	Alison Krauss & Union Station	"Looking in the Eyes of Love"
1998	Alabama	"Dancin', Shaggin' on the Boulevard"
1998	Diamond Rio	"How Your Love Makes Me Feel"
1998	The Kinleys	"Please"
1998	The Mavericks	"I Don't Care (If You Love Me Anymore)"
1999	Dixie Chicks	"There's Your Trouble"
1999	Alabama	"How Do You Fall In Love"
1999	BR5-49	"Wild One"
1999	The Mavericks	"Dance the Night Away"
1999	The Wilkinsons	"26 Cents"

=== 2000s ===
Year	Artist	Work
2000	Dixie Chicks	"Ready to Run"
2000	BR5-49	"Honky Tonk Song"
2000	Diamond Rio	"Unbelievable"
2000	Lonestar	"Amazed"
2000	SHeDAISY	"Little Good-Byes"
2001	Asleep at the Wheel	"Cherokee Maiden"
2001	Alabama	"Twentieth Century"
2001	Brooks & Dunn	"You'll Always Be Loved By Me"
2001	Riders in the Sky	"Woody's Roundup"
2001	The Wilkinsons	"Jimmy's Got a Girlfriend"
2002	Alison Krauss & Union Station	"The Lucky One"
2002	Asleep at the Wheel	"Ain't Nobody Here but Us Chickens"
2002	Brooks & Dunn	"Ain't Nothing 'Bout You"
2002	Diamond Rio	"One More Day"
2002	Lonestar	"I'm Already There"
2003	Dixie Chicks	"Long Time Gone"
2003	Diamond Rio	"Beautiful Mess"
2003	Lonestar	"Not a Day Goes By"
2003	Nitty Gritty Dirt Band	"Roll the Stone Away"
2003	Trick Pony	"Just What I Do"
2004	Ricky Skaggs and Kentucky Thunder	"A Simple Life"
2004	Brooks & Dunn	"Red Dirt Road"
2004	Diamond Rio	"I Believe"
2004	Lonestar	"My Front Porch Looking In"
2004	The Oak Ridge Boys	"Colors"
2005	Dixie Chicks	"Top of the World" (Live)
2005	Asleep at the Wheel	"New San Antonio Rose"
2005	Big & Rich	"Save a Horse (Ride a Cowboy)"
2005	Brooks & Dunn	"You Can't Take the Honky Tonk Out of the Girl"
2005	Notorious Cherry Bombs	"It's Hard to Kiss the Lips at Night That Chew Your Ass Out All Day Long"
2006	Alison Krauss & Union Station	"Restless"
2006	Big & Rich	"Comin' to Your City"
2006	Brooks & Dunn	"Play Something Country"
2006	Dixie Chicks	"I Hope"
2006	Rascal Flatts	"Bless the Broken Road"
2007	Dixie Chicks	"Not Ready to Make Nice"
2007	The Duhks	"Heaven's My Home"
2007	Little Big Town	"Boondocks"
2007	Rascal Flatts	"What Hurts the Most"
2007	The Wreckers	"Leave the Pieces"
2008	Eagles	"How Long"
2008	Brooks & Dunn	"Proud of the House We Built"
2008	Emerson Drive	"Moments"
2008	Montgomery Gentry	"Lucky Man"
2008	The Time Jumpers	"Sweet Memories"
2009	Sugarland	"Stay"
2009	Brooks & Dunn	"God Must Be Busy"
2009	Lady Antebellum	"Love Don't Live Here"
2009	Rascal Flatts	"Every Day"
2009	The SteelDrivers	"Blue Side of the Mountain"

=== 2010s ===
Year	Artist	Work
2010	Lady Antebellum	"I Run to You"
2010	Brooks & Dunn	"Cowgirls Don't Cry"
2010	Rascal Flatts	"Here Comes Goodbye"
2010	Sugarland	"It Happens"
2010	Zac Brown Band	"Chicken Fried"
2011	Lady Antebellum	"Need You Now"
2011	Dailey & Vincent	"Elizabeth"
2011	Little Big Town	"Little White Church"
2011	The SteelDrivers	"Where Rainbows Never Die"
2011	Zac Brown Band	"Free"

== Artists with multiple wins ==
5 wins

- Dixie Chicks
- The Judds

3 wins

- Emmylou Harris
- Alison Krauss & Union Station

2 wins

- Alabama
- Asleep at the Wheel
- Brooks & Dunn
- Rita Coolidge
- Lady Antebellum
- Kris Kristofferson

== Artists with multiple nominations ==
12 nominations

- Alabama
- Brooks & Dunn

9 nominations

- Diamond Rio

8 nominations

- The Judds
- Willie Nelson
- The Oak Ridge Boys

7 nominations

- Asleep at the Wheel
- The Statler Brothers

6 nominations

- Dixie Chicks
- Waylon Jennings
- Loretta Lynn
- Dolly Parton
- Conway Twitty

5 nominations

- Johnny Cash
- Emmylou Harris
- The Mavericks
- Restless Heart

4 nominations

- Larry Gatlin & the Gatlin Brothers Band
- George Jones
- Alison Krauss & Union Station
- Kris Kristofferson
- Lonestar
- Nitty Gritty Dirt Band
- Rascal Flatts
- Kenny Rogers
- Porter Wagoner
- Dottie West
- Tammy Wynette

3 nominations

- BR5-49
- June Carter
- Rita Coolidge
- Forester Sisters
- The Kentucky Headhunters
- Lady Antebellum

2 nominations

- Big & Rich
- Zac Brown Band
- Charlie Daniels Band
- The Desert Rose Band
- Highway 101
- The Kentucky Headhunters
- Little Big Town
- Little Texas
- Roy Orbison
- The Pointer Sisters
- Shenandoah
- The SteelDrivers
- Sugarland
- Tompall & the Glaser Brothers
- Texas Tornados
- The Tractors
- The Wilkinsons

== See also ==
- Grammy Award for Best Country Duo/Group Performance
