= List of RPM number-one country singles of 1978 =

These are the Canadian number-one country songs of 1978, per the RPM Country Tracks chart.

Issue date	Title	Artist
January 14	Take This Job and Shove It	Johnny Paycheck
January 21	My Way	Elvis Presley
January 28	My Way	Elvis Presley
February 4	What a Difference You've Made in My Life	Ronnie Milsap
February 11	What a Difference You've Made in My Life	Ronnie Milsap
February 18	Out of My Head and Back in My Bed	Loretta Lynn
February 25	You're the One	The Oak Ridge Boys
March 4	You're the One	The Oak Ridge Boys
March 11	To Daddy	Emmylou Harris
March 18	Mamas Don't Let Your Babies Grow Up to Be Cowboys	Waylon Jennings and Willie Nelson
March 25	Mamas Don't Let Your Babies Grow Up to Be Cowboys	Waylon Jennings and Willie Nelson
April 1	Mamas Don't Let Your Babies Grow Up to Be Cowboys	Waylon Jennings and Willie Nelson
April 8	I Might as Well Believe (I'll Live Forever)	Carroll Baker
April 15	Do I Love You (Yes in Every Way)	Donna Fargo
April 22	Ready For the Times to Get Better	Crystal Gayle
April 29	Someone Loves You Honey	Charley Pride
May 6	Someone Loves You Honey	Charley Pride
May 13	Every Time Two Fools Collide	Kenny Rogers and Dottie West
May 20	It's All Wrong, But It's All Right	Dolly Parton
May 27	She Can Put Her Shoes Under my Bed (Anytime)	Johnny Duncan
June 3	Georgia on My Mind	Willie Nelson
June 10	Georgia on My Mind	Willie Nelson
June 17	Night Time Magic	Larry Gatlin
June 24	Two More Bottles of Wine	Emmylou Harris
July 1	I Can't Wait Any Longer	Bill Anderson
July 8	I Can't Wait Any Longer	Bill Anderson
July 15	Portrait in the Window	Carroll Baker
July 22	It Only Hurts for a Little While	Margo Smith
July 29	I Believe in You	Mel Tillis
August 5	You Needed Me	Anne Murray
August 12	Homefolks	Bob Murphy & Big Buffalo
August 19	Love or Something Like It	Kenny Rogers
August 26	Only One Love in My Life	Ronnie Milsap
September 2	Talking in Your Sleep	Crystal Gayle
September 9	When I Stop Leavin' (I'll Be Gone)	Charley Pride
September 16	Boogie Grass Band	Conway Twitty
September 23	Blue Skies	Willie Nelson
September 30	I've Always Been Crazy	Waylon Jennings
October 7	Heartbreaker	Dolly Parton
October 14	Heartbreaker	Dolly Parton
October 21	Heartbreaker	Dolly Parton
October 28	It's Been a Great Afternoon	Merle Haggard
November 18	Let's Take the Long Way Around the World	Ronnie Milsap
November 25	Cryin' Again	The Oak Ridge Boys
December 2	Sleeping Single In a Double Bed	Barbara Mandrell
December 9	Sleeping Single In a Double Bed	Barbara Mandrell
December 16	That's What You Do to Me	Charly McClain
December 23	Hooked on a Feeling	Carroll Baker
December 30	Hooked on a Feeling	Carroll Baker

== See also ==
- 1978 in music
- List of number-one country singles of 1978 (U.S.)
