= 42 Ultimate Hits =

Compilation album by Kenny Rogers
- Released: June 1, 2004
- Genre: Country
- Label: Capitol Nashville
- Producer: Tom Becci and Jim Mazza (compilation); Keith Stegall, Brent Maher (new songs); Various original producers for previously released material

Kenny Rogers chronology
Back to the Well (2003)	42 Ultimate Hits (2004)	21 Number Ones (2006)

Singles from 42 Ultimate Hits
- 1. "My World Is Over" Released: June 1, 2004

Professional ratings
Review scores
Source	Rating
Allmusic	4.5/5 stars

42 Ultimate Hits is a compilation album by American country music artist Kenny Rogers. It was released in 2004 via Capitol Nashville. The album peaked at number 6 on the Billboard Top Country Albums chart. It includes 40 previously released songs by Rogers, five of which he recorded as Kenny Rogers and the First Edition, plus two new tracks: "My World Is Over" and "We Are the Same".

The compilation was produced by Tom Becci and Jim Mazza, with various original producers on the previously released material. "My World Is Over" was produced by Keith Stegall, and "We Are the Same" by Brent Maher.

== Track listing ==
Disc 1
No.	Title	Writer(s)	Length
1.	"Just Dropped In (To See What Condition My Condition Was In)"	Mickey Newbury	3:22
2.	"Ruby, Don't Take Your Love to Town"	Mel Tillis	2:58
3.	"Reuben James"	Barry Etris, Alex Harvey	2:49
4.	"Something's Burning"	Mac Davis	3:59
5.	"Tell It All Brother"	Harvey	3:23
6.	"Love Lifted Me"	Preston Ross, Howard Smith	3:45
7.	"Lucille"	Roger Bowling, Hal Bynum	3:37
8.	"Daytime Friends"	Ben Peters	3:11
9.	"Sweet Music Man"	Kenny Rogers	4:20
10.	"Every Time Two Fools Collide" (with Dottie West)	Jan Dyer, Jeff Tweel	3:02
11.	"Love or Something Like It"	Rogers, Steve Glassmeyer	2:54
12.	"Anyone Who Isn't Me Tonight" (with Dottie West)	Julie Didler, Casey Kelly	2:23
13.	"The Gambler"	Don Schlitz	3:35
14.	"All I Ever Need Is You" (with Dottie West)	Jimmy Holiday, Eddie Reeves	3:09
15.	"She Believes in Me"	Steve Gibb	4:15
16.	"'Til I Can Make It on My Own" (with Dottie West)	George Richey, Billy Sherrill, Tammy Wynette	3:20
17.	"You Decorated My Life"	Debbie Hupp, Bob Morrison	3:41
18.	"Coward of the County"	Roger Bowling, Billy Ed Wheeler	4:22
19.	"Don't Fall in Love with a Dreamer" (with Kim Carnes)	Kim Carnes, David Ellingson	3:42
20.	"Love the World Away"	Morrison, Johnny Wilson	3:13
21.	"Lady"	Lionel Richie	3:54

Disc 2
No.	Title	Writer(s)	Length
1.	"What Are We Doin' in Love" (with Dottie West)	Randy Goodrum	3:04
2.	"I Don't Need You"	Rick Christian	3:30
3.	"Share Your Love with Me"	Alfred Braggs, Deadric Malone	3:20
4.	"Blaze of Glory"	Larry Keith, Danny Morrison, Johnny Slate	2:40
5.	"Through the Years"	Steve Dorff, Marty Panzer	4:24
6.	"Love Will Turn You Around"	Rogers, David Malloy, Thom Schuyler, Even Stevens	3:40
7.	"A Love Song"	Lee Greenwood	3:18
8.	"We've Got Tonight" (with Sheena Easton)	Bob Seger	3:52
9.	"Scarlet Fever"	Mike Dekle	3:56
10.	"Islands in the Stream" (with Dolly Parton)	Barry Gibb, Robin Gibb, Maurice Gibb	4:13
11.	"Buried Treasure"	B. Gibb, R. Gibb, M. Gibb	4:13
12.	"Crazy"	Richard Marx, Rogers	3:45
13.	"Morning Desire"	Dave Loggins	4:11
14.	"Make No Mistake, She's Mine" (with Ronnie Milsap)	Carnes	4:00
15.	"Twenty Years Ago"	Wood Newton, Michael Noble, Michael Spriggs, Dan Tyler	3:47
16.	"The Vows Go Unbroken (Always True to You)"	Gary Burr, Eric Kaz	3:33
17.	"The Greatest"	Schlitz	3:14
18.	"Buy Me a Rose" (with Alison Krauss and Billy Dean)	Jim Funk, Erik Hickenlooper	3:50
19.	"It's a Beautiful Life"	Charlie Black, Jim Collins, Phil Vassar	3:15
20.	"My World Is Over" (with Whitney Duncan)	Whitney Duncan, Brian Nash, Mike Post	3:47
21.	"We Are the Same"	Kieran Kane, Brent Maher	4:30

== Chart performance ==
=== Weekly charts ===
Chart (2004)	Peak position
US Billboard 200	39
US Top Country Albums (Billboard)	6

=== Year-end charts ===
Chart (2004)	Position
US Top Country Albums (Billboard)	64
