= 15th Academy of Country Music Awards =

US music awards ceremony in 1980

- Date: May 1, 1980
- Location: Knott's Berry Farm, Buena Park, California
- Hosted by: Claude Akins; Loretta Lynn; Charley Pride

Highlights
- Most wins: Larry Gatlin (3)
- Most nominations: Kenny Rogers (5)

Television/radio coverage
- Network: NBC

The 15th Academy of Country Music Awards ceremony was held on May 1, 1980, at Knott's Berry Farm, Buena Park, California. It was hosted by Claude Akins, Loretta Lynn and Charley Pride.

== Winners and nominees ==
Winners are shown in bold.

Entertainer of the Year	Album of the Year
**Willie Nelson**; Crystal Gayle; Waylon Jennings; Loretta Lynn; Kenny Rogers	**Straight Ahead — Larry Gatlin**; Blue Kentucky Girl — Emmylou Harris; Greatest Hits — Waylon Jennings; Kenny — Kenny Rogers; Sings Kristofferson — Willie Nelson
Top Female Vocalist of the Year	Top Male Vocalist of the Year
**Crystal Gayle**; Loretta Lynn; Barbara Mandrell; Anne Murray; Dolly Parton	**Larry Gatlin**; Moe Bandy; Waylon Jennings; Kenny Rogers; Don Williams
Single Record of the Year	Song of the Year
**"All the Gold in California"** — **Larry Gatlin & the Gatlin Brothers**; "Amanda" — Waylon Jennings; "Coward of the County" — Kenny Rogers; "The Devil Went Down to Georgia" — Charlie Daniels Band; "Half the Way" — Crystal Gayle	**"It's a Cheating Situation"** — **Curly Putman, Sonny Throckmorton**; "All the Gold in California" — Larry Gatlin; "Last Cheater's Waltz" — Sonny Throckmorton; "She Believes in Me" — Steve Gibb; "You're the Only One" — Carole Bayer Sager, Bruce Roberts
Top New Male Vocalist	Top New Female Vocalist
**R.C. Bannon**; John Anderson; Razzy Bailey; Randy Barlow; Big Al Downing	**Lacy J. Dalton**; Rosanne Cash; Gail Davies; Louise Mandrell; Sylvia
Top Vocal Group of the Year	Tex Ritter Movie of the Year
**Moe Bandy** **and** **Joe Stampley**; Jim Ed Brown and Helen Cornelius; Louise Mandrell and R.C. Bannon; Oak Ridge Boys; Statler Brothers	**The Electric Horseman**; Concrete Cowboys; Elvis; Living Legend
Pioneer Award
**Patti Page**
Artist of the Decade
**Loretta Lynn**
Jim Reeves Memorial Award
**Bill Ward**

== Performers ==
Performer(s)	Song(s)
Claude Akins; Loretta Lynn; Charley Pride; Dallas Cowboys Cheerleaders	"Take Me Home, Country Roads"
Donna Fargo	"Somebody Special"
Oak Ridge Boys	"Leaving Louisiana in the Broad Daylight"
Larry Gatlin & the Gatlin Brothers	"Taking Somebody with Me When I Fall"
Barbara Mandrell; Eddie Rabbitt	Song of the Year Medley "It's a Cheating Situation" "She Believes in Me" "Last Cheater's Waltz" "You're the Only One" "All the Gold in California"
Dallas Cowboys Cheerleaders	Dance Performance
Loretta Lynn	"Naked in the Rain"
The Charlie Daniels Band	"In America"
John Anderson; Randy Barlow; Big Al Downing; R.C. Bannon; Razzy Bailey	Top New Male Vocalist Medley "She Just Started Liking Cheatin' Songs" "Lay Back in the Arms of Someone" "The Story Behind the Story" "Winners and Losers" "Too Old to Play Cowboy"
Charley Pride; Janie Fricke	"Four Walls"
Louise Mandrell; Sylvia; Gail Davies; Rosanne Cash; Lacy J. Dalton	Top New Female Vocalist Medley "Wake Me Up" "It Don't Hurt to Dream" "Like Strangers" "Couldn't Do Nothin' Right" "Crazy Blue Eyes"

== Presenters ==
Presenter(s)	Notes
Susan Anton; David Soul	Single Record of the Year
Bobby Bare; Zsa Zsa Gabor	Top Vocal Group of the Year
Melissa Sue Anderson; Sonny James	Album of the Year
Kitty Wells; Greg Evigan	Top Female Vocalist of the Year
Roger Miller	Presented Pioneer Award to Patti Page
Lynn Anderson; Terry Bradshaw	Song of the Year
Dottie West; Barbi Benton	Top Male Vocalist of the Year
Barbara Eden; Jan-Michael Vincent	Tex Ritter Movie of the Year
Crystal Gayle	Presented Artist of the Decade Award to Loretta Lynn
Mickey Gilley; Charo	Top New Male Vocalist
T.G. Sheppard	Presented Jim Reeves Memorial Award to Bill Ward
Moe Bandy; Joe Stampley	Top New Female Vocalist
Bobbie Gentry	Entertainer of the Year
