= List of Hot Country Singles number ones of 1978 =

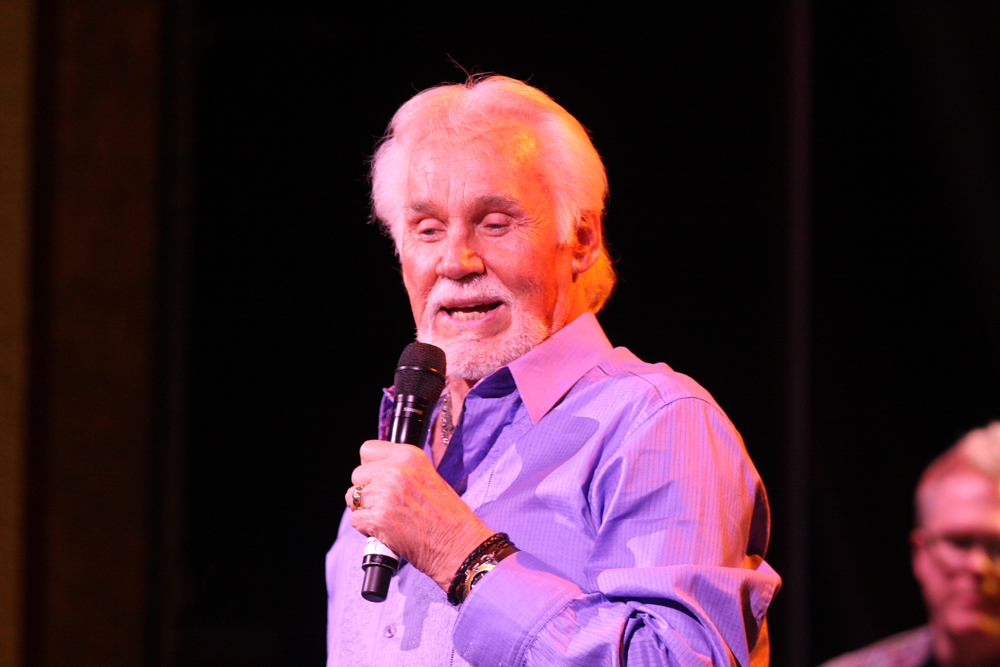
Kenny Rogers had three number ones in 1978.

Hot Country Songs is a chart that ranks the top-performing country music songs in the United States, published by Billboard magazine. In 1978, 31 different singles topped the chart, then published under the title Hot Country Singles, in 52 issues of the magazine, based on playlists submitted by country music radio stations and sales reports submitted by stores.

Several number ones of 1978 came from artists associated with the so-called outlaw country subgenre, which had emerged as a more hard-edged alternative to the slick production values seen in country music earlier in the 1970s. Two of the most prominent exponents of the outlaw style, Waylon Jennings and Willie Nelson, collaborated on the longest-running number one of the year, "Mammas Don't Let Your Babies Grow Up to Be Cowboys", which spent four weeks atop the chart; each also reached number one individually. Jennings' total of seven weeks spent in the top spot was the most by any artist. Nelson was one of only two artists to take three different singles to number one during the year, as he also reached number one with his recordings of two pre-World War II songs, "Georgia on My Mind" and "Blue Skies", taken from Stardust, an album on which he covered a range of pop standards. Kenny Rogers also achieved three number ones, as he topped the listing with "Love or Something Like It", "The Gambler" and "Every Time Two Fools Collide", a collaboration with Dottie West.

Another artist linked to the outlaw movement who topped the chart in 1978 was Johnny Paycheck, who reached number one with "Take This Job and Shove It", which would go on to become his most successful and best-known song. The song, which topped the chart in Billboard's first issue of the year, marked his first and only appearance at the top of the Hot Country chart. In May and June, two vocal groups which would both go on to be inducted into the Country Music Hall of Fame reached number one for the first time: The Statler Brothers with "Do You Know You Are My Sunshine", and The Oak Ridge Boys with "I'll Be True to You". Margo Smith had her first number one in February with "Don't Break the Heart That Loves You". She followed it up with another chart-topper in July with "It Only Hurts for a Little While", but these would prove to be her only number one singles. In April, Dottie West reached the top of the chart for the first time with her duet with Kenny Rogers. She would go on to achieve further number ones both in collaboration with Rogers and in her own right.

== Chart history ==
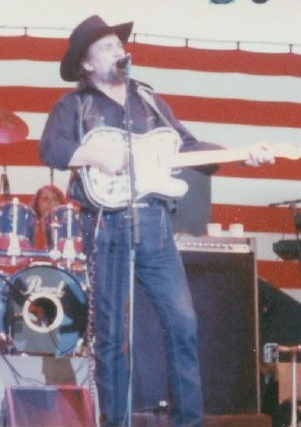
Waylon Jennings spent a total of seven weeks at number one in 1978.

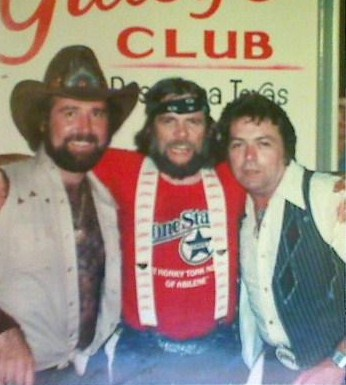
Johnny Paycheck (center) topped the chart with his signature song "Take This Job and Shove It".

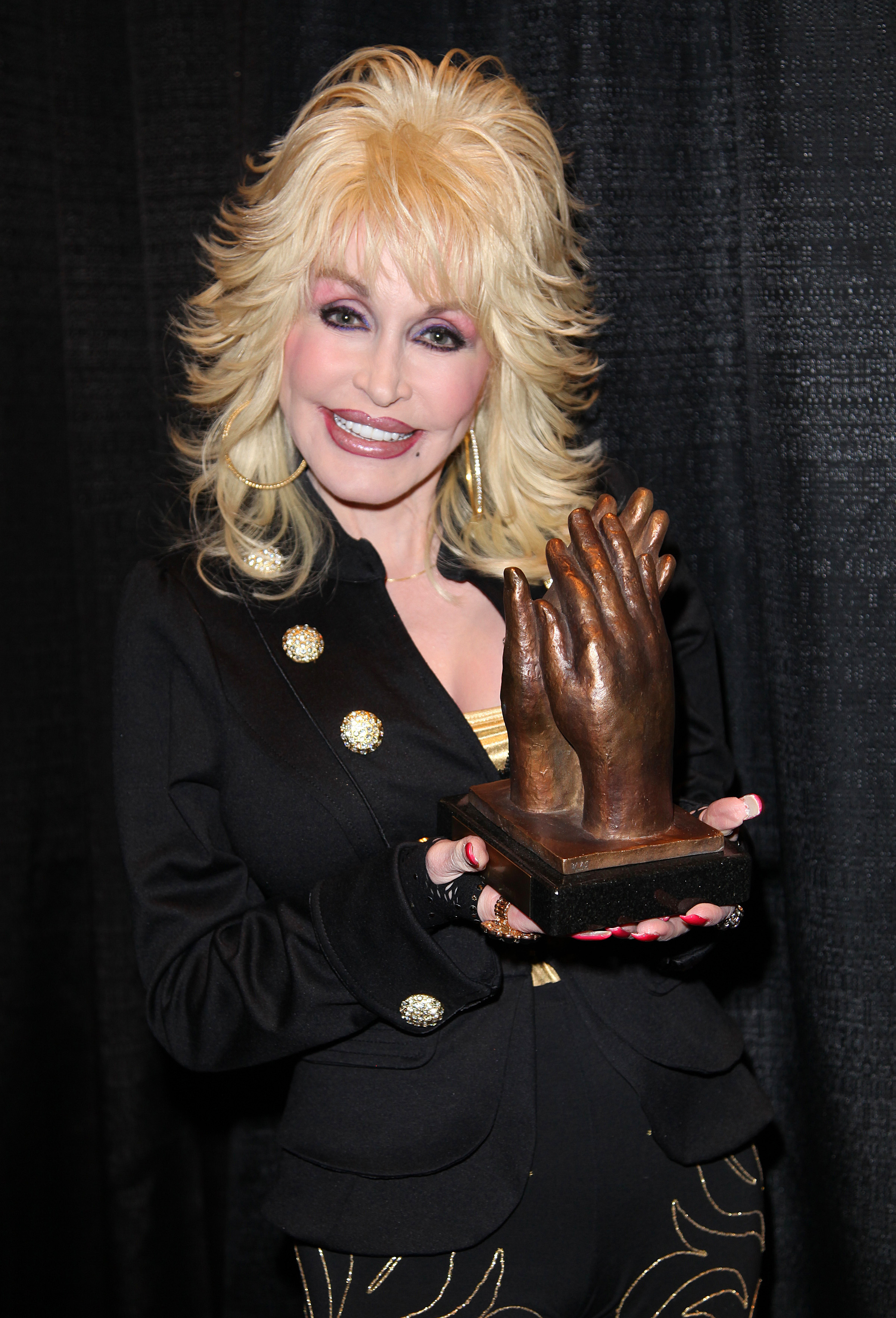
Dolly Parton had two chart-toppers which spent a combined five weeks at number one.

Issue date	Title	Artist(s)	Ref.
January 7	"Take This Job and Shove It"	Johnny Paycheck	
January 14	"Take This Job and Shove It"	Johnny Paycheck	
January 21	"What a Difference You've Made in My Life"	Ronnie Milsap	
January 28	"Out of My Head and Back in My Bed"	Loretta Lynn	
February 4	"Out of My Head and Back in My Bed"	Loretta Lynn	
February 11	"I Just Wish You Were Someone I Love"	Larry Gatlin	
February 18	"Don't Break the Heart That Loves You"	Margo Smith	
February 25	"Don't Break the Heart That Loves You"	Margo Smith	
March 4	"Mammas Don't Let Your Babies Grow Up to Be Cowboys"	Waylon Jennings and Willie Nelson	
March 11	"Mammas Don't Let Your Babies Grow Up to Be Cowboys"	Waylon Jennings and Willie Nelson	
March 18	"Mammas Don't Let Your Babies Grow Up to Be Cowboys"	Waylon Jennings and Willie Nelson	
March 25	"Mammas Don't Let Your Babies Grow Up to Be Cowboys"	Waylon Jennings and Willie Nelson	
April 1	"Ready for the Times to Get Better"	Crystal Gayle	
April 8	"Someone Loves You Honey"	Charley Pride	
April 15	"Someone Loves You Honey"	Charley Pride	
April 22	"Every Time Two Fools Collide"	Kenny Rogers and Dottie West	
April 29	"Every Time Two Fools Collide"	Kenny Rogers and Dottie West	
May 6	"It's All Wrong, But It's All Right"	Dolly Parton	
May 13	"It's All Wrong, But It's All Right"	Dolly Parton	
May 20	"She Can Put Her Shoes Under My Bed (Anytime)"	Johnny Duncan	
May 27	"Do You Know You Are My Sunshine"	The Statler Brothers	
June 3	"Do You Know You Are My Sunshine"	The Statler Brothers	
June 10	"Georgia on My Mind"	Willie Nelson	
June 17	"Two More Bottles of Wine"	Emmylou Harris	
June 24	"I'll Be True to You"	The Oak Ridge Boys	
July 1	"It Only Hurts for a Little While"	Margo Smith	
July 8	"I Believe in You"	Mel Tillis	
July 15	"Only One Love in My Life"	Ronnie Milsap	
July 22	"Only One Love in My Life"	Ronnie Milsap	
July 29	"Only One Love in My Life"	Ronnie Milsap	
August 5	"Love or Something Like It"	Kenny Rogers	
August 12	"You Don't Love Me Anymore"	Eddie Rabbitt	
August 19	"Talking in Your Sleep"	Crystal Gayle	
August 26	"Talking in Your Sleep"	Crystal Gayle	
September 2	"Blue Skies"	Willie Nelson	
September 9	"I've Always Been Crazy"	Waylon Jennings	
September 16	"I've Always Been Crazy"	Waylon Jennings	
September 23	"I've Always Been Crazy"	Waylon Jennings	
September 30	"Heartbreaker"	Dolly Parton	
October 7	"Heartbreaker"	Dolly Parton	
October 14	"Heartbreaker"	Dolly Parton	
October 21	"Tear Time"	Dave & Sugar	
October 28	"Let's Take the Long Way Around the World"	Ronnie Milsap	
November 4	"Sleeping Single in a Double Bed"	Barbara Mandrell	
November 11	"Sleeping Single in a Double Bed"	Barbara Mandrell	
November 18	"Sleeping Single in a Double Bed"	Barbara Mandrell	
November 25	"Sweet Desire" / "Old Fashioned Love" (Note: Double A-sided single)	The Kendalls	
December 2	"I Just Want to Love You"	Eddie Rabbitt	
December 9	"On My Knees"	Charlie Rich and Janie Fricke	
December 16	"The Gambler"	Kenny Rogers	
December 23	"The Gambler"	Kenny Rogers	
December 30	"The Gambler"	Kenny Rogers	

== See also ==
- 1978 in music
- List of artists who reached number one on the U.S. country chart
