= Volcanic Action of My Soul =

Studio album by Ray Charles
- Released: April 1971
- Studio: RPM/Tangerine Studios, Los Angeles, California
- Genre: R&B, soul
- Length: 39:32
- Label: ABC/Tangerine
- Producer: Joe Adams

Ray Charles chronology
Love Country Style (1970)	Volcanic Action of My Soul (1971)	A Message from the People (1972)

Professional ratings
Review scores
Source	Rating
AllMusic	3/5 stars
Christgau's Record Guide	A−

Volcanic Action of My Soul is a studio album by American singer and pianist Ray Charles. It was released in April 1971 by Tangerine Records.

== Chart performance ==
The album debuted on Billboard magazine's Top LP's chart in the issue dated May 29, 1971, peaking at No. 52 during a sixteen-week run on the chart.

== Track listing ==
Side 1

1. "See You Then" (Jimmy Webb) – 4:19
2. "What Am I Living For" (Art Harris, Fred Jay) – 3:36
3. "Feel So Bad" (James Johnson, Leslie Temple) – 3:14
4. "The Long and Winding Road" (John Lennon, Paul McCartney) – 3:04
5. "The Three Bells" (Bert Reisfeld, Jean Villard) – 4:19

Side 2

1. "All I Ever Need Is You" (Eddie Reeves, Jimmy Holiday) – 4:00
2. "Wichita Lineman" (Jimmy Webb) – 4:03
3. "Something" (George Harrison) – 4:00
4. "I May Be Wrong (but I Think You're Wonderful)" (Henry Sullivan, Harry Ruskin) – 2.59
5. "Down In The Valley" (Traditional) – 4:35

== Personnel ==
- Ray Charles – keyboards, vocals
- Buddy Emmons – pedal steel guitar
- Glen Campbell – mandolin on "All I Ever Need Is You"

== Charts ==
Chart (1971)	Peak position
US Billboard Top LPs	52
