= Rebecca Walker (disambiguation) =

Rebecca Walker is a writer.

Rebecca or Becky Walker may also refer to:

- Rebecca Walker (politician) (born 1968)
- Rebecca Walker (Geordie Shore)
- Sweet Becky Walker, song
