= Dottie (album) =

Studio album by Dottie West
- Released: August 1978
- Recorded: September 28–29, 1977
- Studio: Jack Clement Recording (Nashville, Tennessee)
- Genre: Country; Countrypolitan
- Label: United Artists
- Producer: Larry Butler

Dottie West chronology
When It's Just You and Me (1977)	Dottie (1978)	Every Time Two Fools Collide (1978)

Singles from Dottie
- 1. "Come See Me and Come Lonely" Released: May 1978

Dottie is a studio album by American country artist Dottie West. It was released in August 1978 via United Artists Records and contained ten tracks. It was the 26th studio album of West's career and her third with the United Artists label. Of its ten tracks, three were self-penned by West herself. One single was spawned from the album titled "Come See Me and Come Lonely", which reached the top 20 on the US country chart. Dottie also made the US country albums chart following its original release and was given a positive review by Record World magazine.

== Background, recording and content ==
During the 1960s and early 1970s, Dottie West had found commercial success with self-penned songs featuring vocal performances that were considered "plaintive" and "heart wrenching". Songs like "Here Comes My Baby" (1964), "Paper Mansions" (1968), "Country Sunshine" (1973) and "Last Time I Saw Him" (1974). In 1976, West moved to United Artists Records and started recording duets with Kenny Rogers, beginning with 1978's "Every Time Two Fools Collide". The song, along with several collaborative albums and further singles elevated and revived West's career. "Every Time Two Fools Collide" would be followed by West's second United Artists solo album titled Dottie.

Dottie was recorded at the Jack Clement Recording Studio, located in Nashville, Tennessee. The sessions for the album were held on September 28 and 29 of 1977. The album was produced by Larry Butler. Dottie consisted of ten tracks which were mostly considered to be ballads. Three of the album's tracks were co-written by West herself: "Goodbye Is the Loneliest Word", "Decorate Your Conscience" and "Love Is Right". Also included was a cover of Larry Gatlin's "Broken Lady".

== Release, reception, chart performance and singles ==
Dottie was originally released in August 1978 on United Artists Records. It was the 26th studio album released in West's career and her fourth with United Artists. The label originally distributed the album as a vinyl LP and cassette. Decades later, it was re-released to digital platforms including Apple Music. Dottie was given a positive review by Record World magazine in August 1978. Reviewers praised Larry Butler's use of both string arrangements and more traditional country elements. They also highlighted several songs from the album as "standouts" including "Broken Lady" and "Decorate Your Conscience".

Dottie spent a total of three weeks on the US Country Albums chart. On September 16, 1978, the album reached the number 47 position on the chart. It became West's second-lowest album to make the US country albums chart, with 1983's New Horizons being her lowest-charting. The only single spawned from the album was "Come See Me and Come Lonely", which was first released by United Artists in May 1978. Later that year, the single reached the top 20 of the US Hot Country Songs chart, peaking at number 17. In Canada, the single reached the number 28 position on their country chart.

== Track listing ==
Side one
No.	Title	Writer(s)	Length
1.	"Come See Me and Come Lonely"	Red Lane	2:08
2.	"If I Could Just Find My Way"	Jim Weatherly	3:20
3.	"Even If You Were Jesse James"	Kenny O'Dell; Larry Henley	2:17
4.	"There's More to a Tear (Than Meets the Eye)"	Roger Bowling; Larry Butler; Billie Jo Spears	2:44
5.	"Broken Lady"	Larry Gatlin	2:16

Side two
No.	Title	Writer(s)	Length
1.	"Goodbye Is the Loneliest Word"	Butler; Dottie West	3:09
2.	"Decorate Your Conscience"	D. West; Kerry West	3:41
3.	"Good 'Ol Nights"	Ben Peters	2:40
4.	"Who's Gonna Love Me Now"	Ed Penney; Ron Oates	2:55
5.	"Love Is Right"	D. West; K. West	1:50

== Personnel ==
All credits are adapted from the liner notes of Dottie.

Musical personnel

- Tommy Allsup – Bass guitar
- Byron Bach – Strings
- George Binkley – Strings
- Jimmy Capps – Guitar
- Marvin Chantry – Strings
- Roy Christensen – Strings
- Pete Drake –Steel guitar
- Ray Edenton – Guitar
- Carl Gorodetzky – Strings
- Buddy Harman – Drums
- Martin Katahn – Strings
- Sheldon Kurland – Strings
- Hargus "Pig" Robbins – Keyboards (Fender Rhodes)
- Billy Sanford – Guitar
- Steven Smith – Strings
- Donald Teal – Strings
- Samuel Terranova – Strings
- Gary Vanosdale – Strings
- Pete Wade – Guitar
- Dottie West – Lead vocals

Technical personnel

- Bill Burks – Art direction
- Larry Butler – Producer
- Bill Justis – String arrangement
- Ken Kragen – Management
- Jeff Lancaster – Design
- Gary Regester – Photography
- Billy Sherrill – Engineer
- Bob Sowell – Mastering

== Chart performance ==
Chart (1978)	Peak position
US Top Country Albums (Billboard)	47

== Release history ==
Region	Date	Format	Label	Ref.
North America	August 1978	Vinyl LP	United Artists Records	
United Kingdom	August 1978	Cassette; Vinyl LP	United Artists Records	
North America	circa 2023	Music download; streaming	Capitol Records Nashville	
