= Classics (Kenny Rogers and Dottie West album) =

Studio album by Kenny Rogers and Dottie West
- Released: 1979
- Recorded: 1979
- Genre: Country
- Length: 32:44
- Label: United Artists
- Producer: Larry Butler

Kenny Rogers chronology
The Gambler (1978)	Classics (1979)	The Kenny Rogers Singles Album (1979)

Dottie West chronology
Every Time Two Fools Collide (1978)	Classics (1979)	Special Delivery (1980)

Professional ratings
Review scores
Source	Rating
Allmusic	Link

Classics is a duet album by Kenny Rogers and Dottie West, released in 1979.

This album was Kenny Rogers' and Dottie West's second album together. Their previous album, Every Time Two Fools Collide, was a major seller, and made them one of the biggest duet acts country music has ever seen. This album was no different. The album sold very well, and peaked at number three on the Top Country Albums chart in 1979, and No.82 on the Billboard 200. This album featured cover versions of classic hits by other artists, including two country hit singles, one went to number one, called "All I Ever Need Is You" (a big hit for Sonny and Cher), and another went to number three, called "'Til I Can Make It on My Own" (a hit for Tammy Wynette).

The album was certified by the RIAA as Platinum. It has sold over 2 million copies worldwide.

== Track listing ==
No.	Title	Writer(s)	Length
1.	"All I Ever Need Is You"	Jimmy Holiday, Eddie Reeves	3:07
2.	"'Til I Can Make It on My Own"	George Richey, Billy Sherrill, Tammy Wynette	3:17
3.	"Just the Way You Are"	Billy Joel	3:30
4.	"You Needed Me"	Randy Goodrum	3:08
5.	"(Hey Won't You Play) Another Somebody Done Somebody Wrong Song"	Larry Butler, Chips Moman	3:07
6.	"Together Again"	Buck Owens	2:53
7.	"Midnight Flyer"	Paul Craft	3:19
8.	"You've Lost That Lovin' Feelin"	Barry Mann, Phil Spector, Cynthia Weil	4:06
9.	"Let's Take the Long Way Around the World"	Archie Jordan, Naomi Martin	2:55
10.	"Let It Be Me"	Gilbert Bécaud, Mann Curtis, Pierre Delanoé	3:22

== Personnel ==
- Kenny Rogers - vocals
- Dottie West - guitar, vocals
- Tommy Allsup – bass
- Byron Bach – strings
- George Binkley III – strings
- Larry Butler – harpsichord, keyboards, producer
- Jimmy Capps – guitar
- Jerry Carrigan – percussion, drums
- John Catchings – strings
- Marvin Chantry – strings
- Gene Chrisman – percussion, drums
- Roy Christensen – strings
- Bobby Daniels – backing vocals
- Randy Dorman – guitar
- Pete Drake – steel guitar
- Ray Edenton – guitar
- Steve Glassmeyer – soprano saxophone, backing vocals
- Gene Golden – backing vocals
- Carl Gorodetzky – strings
- Lennie Haight – strings
- The Jordanaires – backing vocals
- Bill Justis – strings, string arrangements
- Sheldon Kurland – strings
- Byron Metcalf – percussion, drums
- Bob Moore – bass
- Hargus "Pig" Robbins – keyboards
- Billy Sanford – guitar
- Billy Sherrill – engineer
- Steven Maxwell Smith – strings
- Gary VanOsdale – strings
- Pamela VanOsdale – strings
- Chip Young – guitar
- Reggie Young – guitar

== Charts ==
Chart (1979)	Peak position
Canada Top Albums/CDs (RPM)	60
US Billboard 200	82
US Top Country Albums (Billboard)	3

== Certifications ==
Region	Certification	Certified units/sales
United States (RIAA)	Platinum	1,000,000^{^}
^{^} Shipments figures based on certification alone.
