= 21 Number Ones =

Greatest hits album by Kenny Rogers
- Released: 23 January 2006
- Genre: Country
- Length: 1:19:35
- Label: Capitol Nashville
- Producer: Rob Christie

Kenny Rogers chronology
42 Ultimate Hits (2004)	21 Number Ones (2006)	Water & Bridges (2006)

Professional ratings
Review scores
Source	Rating
AllMusic	4.5/5 stars

21 Number Ones is a compilation album by Kenny Rogers. It was released in 23 January 2006 on Capitol Records Nashville.

== Track listing ==
No.	Title	Writer(s)	Length
1.	"The Gambler"	Don Schlitz	3:31
2.	"Through the Years"	Steve Dorff / Marty Panzer	4:22
3.	"Lady"	Lionel Richie	3:51
4.	"Lucille"	Roger Bowling / Hal Bynum	3:39
5.	"Coward of the County"	Roger Bowling / Billy Edd Wheeler	4:18
6.	"I Don't Need You"	Rick Christian	3:25
7.	"We've Got Tonight" (with Sheena Easton)	Bob Seger	3:47
8.	"Crazy"	Richard Marx / Kenny Rogers	3:39
9.	"Islands in the Stream" (with Dolly Parton)	Barry Gibb / Maurice Gibb / Robin Gibb	4:08
10.	"She Believes in Me"	Steve Gibb	4:10
11.	"Every Time Two Fools Collide" (with Dottie West)	John Dyes / Jeffrey M. Tweel	2:58
12.	"You Decorated My Life"	Debbie Hupp / Bob Morrison	3:36
13.	"Make No Mistake, She's Mine" (with Ronnie Milsap)	Kim Carnes	3:53
14.	"Share Your Love with Me"	Alfred Braggs / Deadric Malone	3:16
15.	"All I Ever Need Is You" (with Dottie West)	Jimmy Holiday / Eddie Reeves	3:07
16.	"Buy Me a Rose" (with Alison Krauss and Billy Dean)	Jim Funk / Erik Hickenlooper	3:42
17.	"Daytime Friends"	Ben Peters	3:08
18.	"Love or Something Like It"	Steve Glassmeyer / Kenny Rogers	2:49
19.	"Love Will Turn You Around"	David Malloy / Kenny Rogers / Thom Schuyler /Even Stevens	3:36
20.	"Morning Desire"	Dave Loggins	4:04
21.	"What Are We Doin' in Love" (with Dottie West)	Randy Goodrum	2:58
22.	"Don't Fall in Love with a Dreamer" (with Kim Carnes) (bonus track)	Kim Carnes / Dave Ellingson	3:38

== Chart performance ==
=== Weekly charts ===
Chart (2006–2007)	Peak position
Australian Albums (ARIA)	61
New Zealand Albums (RMNZ)	17
Norwegian Albums (VG-lista)	17
Portuguese Albums (AFP)	30
US Billboard 200	24
US Top Country Albums (Billboard)	6

Chart (2020)	Peak position
Australian Albums (ARIA)	38

=== Year-end charts ===
Chart (2006)	Position
US Top Country Albums (Billboard)	37
Chart (2007)	Position
US Top Country Albums (Billboard)	73
Chart (2019)	Position
Australian Country Albums (ARIA)	45
Chart (2020)	Position
Australian Country Albums (ARIA)	20
Chart (2021)	Position
Australian Country Albums (ARIA)	29

== Certifications ==
Region	Certification	Certified units/sales
Australia (ARIA)	Platinum	70,000^{^}
New Zealand (RMNZ)	Platinum	15,000^{^}
^{^} Shipments figures based on certification alone.
