= LaDonna =

LaDonna is an English-language feminine given name, a combination of the element la and the Italian name Donna, meaning "lady". It is often found among African Americans. Notable people with the given name include:

- LaDonna Antoine-Watkins (born 1974), Canadian sprinter
- LaDonna Appelbaum (born 1967), American politician
- LaDonna Gatlin (born 1954), American motivational speaker and singer
- LaDonna Harris (born 1931), Native American social activist and politician
- LaDonna Smith (born 1951), American musician
- LaDonna Tittle (born 1946), American radio personality, actress and model
