= I Don't Want to Cry =

"I Don't Wanna Cry" is a song by Mariah Carey.

I Don't Wanna Cry or Don't Wanna Cry may also refer to:

- I Don't Want to Cry!, Chuck Jackson's 1961 album or its title track
- "I Don't Wanna Cry" (Larry Gatlin song), 1977
- "Don't Wanna Cry" (Namie Amuro song), 1996
- "Don't Wanna Cry" (Seventeen song), 2017
- "Don't Wanna Cry", a song by Pete Yorn from Back and Fourth, 2009
- "Don't Wanna Cry", a song by Selena Gomez and Benny Blanco from the album I Said I Love You First, 2025
