= Love Is Just a Game =

Single by Larry Gatlin

from the album Love Is Just a Game
- B-side: "Everytime a Plane Flies Over Our House"
- Released: September 10, 1977
- Genre: Country
- Length: 3:27
- Label: Monument
- Songwriter(s): Larry Gatlin
- Producer(s): Larry Gatlin

Larry Gatlin singles chronology
"I Don't Wanna Cry" (1977)	"Love Is Just a Game" (1977)	"I Just Wish You Were Someone I Love" (1978)

"Love Is Just a Game" is a song written and recorded by American country music artist Larry Gatlin. It was released in September 1977 as the third single and title track from the album Love Is Just a Game. The song reached number 3 on the Billboard Hot Country Singles & Tracks chart.

== Chart performance ==
Chart (1977)	Peak position
US Hot Country Songs (Billboard)	3
Canadian RPM Country Tracks	6
