= Love of a Lifetime (Larry Gatlin & the Gatlin Brothers song) =

Single by Larry Gatlin & the Gatlin Brothers

from the album Alive & Well...Livin' in the Land of Dreams
- B-side: "Don't Blame Me for Colorado"
- Released: February 1988
- Recorded: 1987
- Genre: Country
- Length: 2:55
- Label: Columbia
- Songwriter(s): Larry Gatlin
- Producer(s): Chip Young

Larry Gatlin & the Gatlin Brothers singles chronology
"Changin' Partners" (1987)	"Love of a Lifetime" (1988)	"Alive and Well" (1988)

"Love of a Lifetime" is a song recorded by American country music group Larry Gatlin & the Gatlin Brothers. Written by Larry Gatlin, it was released in February 1988 as the lead single from their album Alive & Well...Livin' in the Land of Dreams. The song peaked at number four on the Billboard Hot Country Singles chart. It was their last top ten single.

== Charts ==
=== Weekly charts ===
Chart (1988)	Peak position
US Billboard Hot Country Singles	4
Canadian RPM Country Tracks	3

=== Year-end charts ===
Chart (1988)	Position
US Hot Country Songs (Billboard)	65
