= Nothing but Your Love Matters =

Single by Larry Gatlin & the Gatlin Brothers

from the album Smile
- B-side: "When the Night Closes In"
- Released: January 18, 1986
- Genre: Country
- Length: 3:00
- Label: Columbia
- Songwriter(s): Larry Gatlin
- Producer(s): Chips Moman

Larry Gatlin & the Gatlin Brothers singles chronology
"Runaway Go Home" (1985)	"Nothing but Your Love Matters" (1986)	"She Used to Be Somebody's Baby" (1986)

"Nothing but Your Love Matters" is a song written by Larry Gatlin, and recorded by American country music group Larry Gatlin & the Gatlin Brothers. It was released in January 1986 as the second single from the album Smile. The song reached number 12 on the Billboard Hot Country Singles & Tracks chart.

== Chart performance ==
Chart (1986)	Peak position
US Hot Country Songs (Billboard)	12
Canadian RPM Country Tracks	9
