= Every Time Two Fools Collide =

Studio album by Kenny Rogers and Dottie West
- Released: March 1978
- Recorded: 1977–78
- Studios: Jack Clement Recording (Nashville, Tennessee)
- Genre: Country pop
- Label: United Artists
- Producer: Larry Butler

Kenny Rogers chronology
| Ten Years of Gold (1977) | Every Time Two Fools Collide (1978) | Love or Something Like It (1978) |

Dottie West chronology
| Dottie (1978) | Every Time Two Fools Collide (1978) | Classics (1979) |

Every Time Two Fools Collide is a 1978 duet album by American country music singers Kenny Rogers and Dottie West.

This was the duo's first album together, after Rogers entered the country market earlier with his massive country pop crossover hit "Lucille" in spring of 1977, followed by a string of more big crossover hits. West, though, was struggling to keep afloat as a country singer, and needed help to bring her career back to where she was in the early part of the decade. Together, they recorded and released this album in 1978, and it was certified gold by the RIAA. The album spawned two big country hits; the title track went to number one (see the "Every Time Two Fools Collide" song article), followed up by the number-two hit "Anyone Who Isn't Me Tonight". The album went to number one on the Top Country albums chart for two weeks, and went to number 186 on the Billboard 200. It has sold over one million copies worldwide.

== Track listing ==
1. "Every Time Two Fools Collide" (Jan Dyer, Jeff Tweel) - 3:00
2. "You and Me" (Roger Bowling, Larry Butler) - 2:57
3. "What's Wrong with Us Today" (Butler, Kenny Rogers, Dottie West) - 2:51
4. "Beautiful Lies" (Marianne Gordon, Milton Brown, Rogers) - 3:24
5. "That's the Way It Could've Been" (Tammy Wynette) - 3:04
6. "Why Don't We Go Somewhere and Love" (Kenny O'Dell, Larry Henley) - 2:47
7. "Baby I'm-a Want You" (David Gates) - 2:34
8. "Anyone Who Isn't Me Tonight" (Julie Didier, Casey Kelly) - 2:20
9. "The Loving Gift" (Kris Kristofferson) - 2:23
10. "We Love Each Other" (Buddy Killen) - 2:49

== Personnel ==
Compiled from liner notes

- Kenny Rogers – vocals
- Dottie West – vocals

Musicians

- Hargus "Pig" Robbins – Fender Rhodes
- Bobby Wood – Fender Rhodes
- Jimmy Capps – guitar
- Ray Edenton – guitar
- Billy Sanford – guitar
- Pete Wade – guitar
- Pete Drake – steel guitar
- Tommy Allsup – six-string bass guitar
- Bob Moore – upright bass
- Jerry Carrigan – drums
- Buddy Harman – drums
- The Jordanaires – backing vocals
- Bill Justis – string arrangements
- Strings – Sheldon Kurland, Byron Bach, George Binkley, Martin Chantry, Roy Christensen, Carl Gorodetzly, Lennie Haight, Marvin Katahn, Wilfred Lehmann, Steven Smith, Samuel Terranova, Gary Vanosdale

=== Production ===
- Larry Butler – producer
- Billy Sherrill – engineer
- Bob Sowell – mastering at Master Control (Nashville, Tennessee).
- Bill Burks – art direction
- Jeff Lancaster – design
- Gary Regester – photography
- Ken Kragen – management

== Charts ==
| Chart (1978) | Peak position |
|---|---|
| Canada Top Albums/CDs (RPM) | 95 |
| US Billboard 200 | 186 |
| US Top Country Albums (Billboard) | 1 |

== Certifications ==
| Region | Certification | Certified units/sales |
|---|---|---|
| United States (RIAA) | Gold | 500,000^{^} |
^{^} Shipments figures based on certification alone.
