= Statues Without Hearts =

Single by Larry Gatlin

from the album High Time
- B-side: "What Will I Do Now"
- Released: October 30, 1976
- Genre: Country
- Length: 2:42
- Label: Monument
- Songwriter(s): Larry Gatlin
- Producer(s): Fred Foster

Larry Gatlin singles chronology
"Warm and Tender" (1976)	"Statues Without Hearts" (1976)	"Anything but Leavin'" (1977)

"Statues Without Hearts" is a song written and recorded by American country music artist Larry Gatlin. It was released in October 1976 as the third single from the album High Time. The song reached number 5 on the Billboard Hot Country Singles & Tracks chart.

== Chart performance ==
Chart (1976–1977)	Peak position
US Hot Country Songs (Billboard)	5
Canadian RPM Country Tracks	4
