= Love or Something Like It =

Studio album by Kenny Rogers
- Released: July 1978
- Studios: Jack Clement Recording (Nashville, Tennessee)
- Length: 33:46
- Label: United Artists
- Producer: Larry Butler

Kenny Rogers chronology
Every Time Two Fools Collide (with Dottie West) (1978)	Love or Something Like It (1978)	The Gambler (1978)

Singles from Love or Something Like It
- 1. "Love or Something Like It" Released: May 29, 1978

Love or Something Like It is the fifth studio album by American country music artist Kenny Rogers, released in 1978. It was Rogers' fourth #1 hit album.

== Overview ==
The album's title cut ("Love or Something Like It") also topped the charts. Though this was the only single to be issued from the album, another cut, "Momma's Waiting" (written by Rogers), was issued on the B-side of a 1978 major hit single, "The Gambler". "Momma's Waiting" was originally recorded by Rogers and The First Edition in 1970.

The song "We Could Have Been The Closest of Friends" was also recorded by a number of other artists including B J Thomas, Sammy Davis Jr. and Tom Jones. Janie Fricke, who provides backing vocals on this album, also recorded the song.

Biographer Chris Bolton notes in the sleevenotes of the 2009 reissue on the Edsel record label that "I Could Be So Good For You", was Kenny's attempt to "go Disco" and suggests the Disco influence may be the reason only one single was pulled from this album. Bolton goes on to call "Momma's Waiting" a close cousin of Merle Haggard's "Mama Tried" and states the album features songs that are much more pop slanted -on the whole- than any of Rogers' previous albums, but the album's best tracks still have an over-riding country sound.

== Track listing ==
No.	Title	Writer(s)	Length
1.	"Love or Something Like It"	Kenny Rogers, Steve Glassmeyer	2:51
2.	"There's a Lot of That Going Around"	Jim Hurt, Steve Pippin	2:41
3.	"Buried Treasures"	Charlie Phillips, Ernie Rowell	3:17
4.	"Something About Your Song"	Jon Hassell	2:38
5.	"Momma's Waiting"	Rogers, Terry Williams	4:07
6.	"We Could Have Been the Closest of Friends"	Johnny Slate, Pippin	3:11
7.	"I Could Be So Good for You"	Alan Rush, Dennis Linde, Randy Cullers, Thomas Cain	2:58
8.	"Sail Away"	Rafe Van Hoy	3:31
9.	"Even a Fool Would Let Go"	Kerry Chater, Tom Snow	3:07
10.	"Highway Flyer"	Doug Owen, Stephen Allen Davis	2:16
11.	"Starting Again"	Rogers, Glassmeyer	3:09

== Personnel ==
- Kenny Rogers – guitar, lead vocals
- Billy Sanford, Fred Carter Jr., Jerry Shook, Jimmy Capps, Randy Dorman, Rick Harper – guitars
- Pete Drake – steel guitar
- Hargus "Pig" Robbins, Steve Glassmeyer – keyboards
- Gene Golden, Edgar Struble – ARP synthesizer
- Edgar Struble – clavinet
- Joe Osborn – bass guitar
- Tommy Allsup – six-string bass guitar
- Bob Moore – upright bass
- Jerry Carrigan, Bobby Daniels – drums, percussion
- Bill Joor, Dennis Good, Philip Forrest, Roger Bissell – horns
- Byron Bach, Carl Gorodetzky, Gary Vanosdale, George Binkley, Lennie Haight, Marvin Chantry, Roy Christensen, Samuel Terranova, Sheldon Kurland, Wilfred Lehman – strings
- Bill Justis – string arrangements
- Bobby Daniels, Janie Fricke, Steve Glassmeyer, Gene Golden, The Jordanaires, Wendellyn Suits – backing vocals

== Production ==
- Producer – Larry Butler
- Engineer – Billy Sherrill
- Recorded at Jack Clement Recording Studios (Nashville, TN).
- Mastered by Bob Sowell at Master Control (Nashville, TN).
- Art Direction and Design – Bill Burks
- Photography – Gary Regester
- Management – Ken Kragen

== Charts ==
=== Weekly charts ===
Chart (1978–79)	Peak position
Canada Top Albums/CDs (RPM)	47
Canada Country Albums/CDs (RPM)	2
US Billboard 200	53
US Top Country Albums (Billboard)	1

=== Year-end charts ===
Chart (1978)	Position
US Top Country Albums (Billboard)	29

Chart (1979)	Position
US Top Country Albums (Billboard)	46

== Certifications ==
Region	Certification	Certified units/sales
Canada (Music Canada)	Gold	50,000^{^}
United States (RIAA)	Gold	500,000^{^}
^{^} Shipments figures based on certification alone.
