= Denver (song) =

Single by Larry Gatlin & the Gatlin Brothers

from the album Houston to Denver
- B-side: "A Dream That Got a Little Out of Hand"
- Released: March 24, 1984
- Genre: Country
- Length: 3:43
- Label: Columbia
- Songwriter(s): Larry Gatlin
- Producer(s): Rick Hall

Larry Gatlin & the Gatlin Brothers singles chronology
"Houston (Means I'm One Day Closer to You)" (1983)	"Denver" (1984)	"The Lady Takes the Cowboy Everytime" (1984)

"Denver" is a song written by Larry Gatlin, and recorded by American country music group Larry Gatlin & the Gatlin Brothers. It was released in March 1984 as the second single from the album Houston to Denver. The song reached number 7 on the Billboard Hot Country Singles & Tracks chart.

== Chart performance ==
Chart (1984)	Peak position
US Hot Country Songs (Billboard)	7
Canadian RPM Country Tracks	5
