= Eddie Reeves =

American songwriter

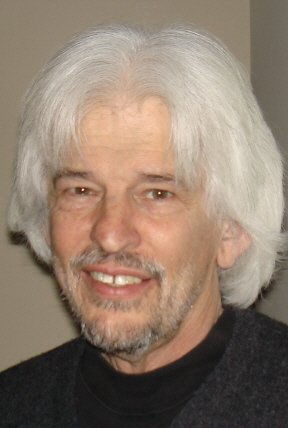
- Eddie Reeves in 2007

Background information
- Born: November 17, 1939 Austin, Texas, United States
- Died: November 18, 2018 (aged 79) Houston, Texas, United States
- Genres: Rock, pop, country, adult contemporary
- Occupation(s): Singer, songwriter, artist manager, publisher, record company executive, writer
- Instruments: Guitar, piano, vocals
- Years active: 1950s–2010s
- Labels: United Artists Music, ABC Records, Chappell Music, Warner Bros.

Edward Benton Reeves (November 17, 1939 – November 18, 2018) was an American songwriter, recording artist, music publisher, artist manager, record company executive, and author. He wrote several hit songs including "All I Ever Need Is You" co-written with Jimmy Holiday and recorded by many artists including Ray Charles, Sonny & Cher, Ray Sanders, Andre Hazes, Tom Jones, Sammi Smith, Chet Atkins & Jerry Reed and Kenny Rogers & Dottie West; "Rings", co-written with Alex Harvey and recorded by Cymarron, Lobo, Reuben Howell, Leo Kottke, Twiggy, Tompall and The Glaser Brothers, Lonnie Mack (a vocal rendition from the guitar man of "Memphis" hit record fame), and other artists; "Don't Change on Me" co-written with Jimmy Holiday and recorded by Ray Charles, B.B. King, Van Morrison (recorded for Warner Bros. but available only on an Italian bootleg album), and by Alan Jackson; "If You Wouldn't Be My Lady", co-written with Jimmy Holiday and recorded by both Ray Charles and Charlie Rich; and "It’s a Hang Up Baby", recorded by both Jerry Lee Lewis and Z.Z. Hill. The song was also performed on November 6, 1969, by Tom Jones with musical backing by the Moody Blues on his national television show, This Is Tom Jones.

BMI awarded Reeves and co-writer Harvey their Special Citation of Achievement for "Rings", having received over one million radio and television performances, making it one of the most performed songs from BMI's repertoire of over eight million songs.

Reeves' songs are associated with three Grammy Award nominations: 1972 Pop Vocal Group – Sonny & Cher – "All I Ever Need Is You" lyrics; 1972 Best Country Vocal Performance – Duo or Group – Tompall & the Glaser Bros. – "Rings"; and 1973 Best Country Instrumental Performance – Chet Atkins, Jerry Reed – Me and Chet (album, which included "All I Ever Need Is You").

== Early life ==
Born in Austin, Texas and raised in Amarillo, Texas, Reeves graduated Amarillo High School with honors and attended the University of Texas at Austin where he was a member of Delta Tau Delta fraternity.

== Career ==
Reeves started singing, playing guitar and writing songs in high school in 1956 and formed the Nighthawks (original band by this name) in 1957 with high school friends Bob Venable, Mike Hinton and John Thompson. The band recorded two singles at Norman Petty Recording Studios in Clovis, New Mexico with only "When Sin Stops" b/w "All’a Your Love" commercially released by Hamilton Records (subsidiary of Dot Records) on November 17, 1958, Reeves' 19th birthday. After college, he returned to Amarillo where he worked for two years in his father's retail building materials, residential construction, and real estate businesses.

In 1964, Norman Petty hired Reeves as his New York representative and the following year Reeves was hired by United Artists Music where he signed an exclusive recording artist and songwriting contract. In 1968, United Artists sent him to Hollywood to set up a West Coast office and during a seven-year tenure at United Artists he worked with Mac Davis, Jackie DeShannon, Jimmy Holiday, Sharon Sheeley, Delaney & Bonnie, Billy Ed Wheeler, Alex Harvey, Buddy Buie, Andy Kim, Paul Leka and Kenny Young amongst others.

In 1972, he signed an exclusive recording artist and songwriting contract with ABC Dunhill Records. In 1974 he accepted a job as the West Coast vice-president of Chappell Music, then the world's largest music publishing company. During his years at Chappell Music, he signed and helped launch the careers of Kim Carnes, the Sanford Townsend Band, Jules Shear and hired the young record producer Jim Ed Norman, with whom in later years he would share success with at Warner Bros. Records. In 1977, Reeves started his own music publishing and personal management company, working with Carnes, Shear (Jules and the Polar Bears) and Slow Children. In 1980, Reeves returned to his hometown of Amarillo, Texas, where he managed real estate properties for four years.

In 1984, Reeves was hired by Jim Ed Norman as general manager of Warner Bros. Records where he spent sixteen years – the last ten as Executive Vice President and general manager, until retiring in 1999 at age 60. While at Warner Bros., Reeves shared in the success of launching and developing the careers of Faith Hill, Randy Travis, Dwight Yoakam, Travis Tritt, Little Texas, Jeff Foxworthy, Bill Engvall, David Ball, and Take 6; whilst promoting the continued success of Hank Williams, Jr., Emmylou Harris, John Anderson, and The Nitty Gritty Dirt Band.

== Books ==
In 2000, Reeves moved to Winnipeg, Manitoba, Canada, and started the process of compiling his songwriting catalog of over 100 songs, as well as beginning work on his collection of writings from notes he had been keeping since 1972. Reeves stated, "My writing is mostly from a spoken-word inner voice and sometimes spoken word makes poor written word. My struggle to succeed in writing something worth reading has on occasion caused me to state my occupation as 'word wrestler.'" When Sin Stops, a collection of life stories and other thoughts, was privately published for friends and family.

== Personal life ==
Reeves has four children – Rhonda, Marc, Natalie, and Sophie – and spent the last 10 years of his life in Houston, Texas with his wife, singer-songwriter, Lena Shammas.

== Death ==
On November 14, 2018, Reeves suffered a massive hemorrhagic stroke at his home in Houston, Texas and died on November 18, 2018, aged 79, surrounded by his family. As he wrote in his book, he requested that he be cremated and his ashes scattered in Middle Fork Lake in New Mexico.

== Discography ==
Year	Artist	Title	S-Single A-Album	Peak chart positions						Certifications (sales thresholds)	Notes
Year	Artist	Title	S-Single A-Album	US	Country	R&B/Soul	AC	UK	Canada	Certifications (sales thresholds)	Notes
1966	Willows	My Kinda Guy	S	-	-	-	-	-	15	-	(#2 Canadian content)
1970	Ray Charles	Love Country Style "Don’t Change On Me"	A	155	-	-	-	-	-	-	
1971	Ray Charles	Don't Change On Me	S	36	-	13	22	-	-	-	
1971	Ray Charles	Volcanic Action of My Soul "All I Ever Need Is You"	A	52	-	-	-	-	-	-	
1971	Cymarron	Rings	S	17	-	-	6	-	41	-	#9 – Canadian AC
1971	Tompall & the Glaser Bros.	Rings	S	-	7	-	-	-	-	-	
1971	Sonny & Cher	All I Ever Need Is You	S	7	-	-	1	8	10	-	5 Weeks at No. 1 on AC Chart
1971	Sonny & Cher	All I Ever Need Is You	A	14	-	-	-	-	7	Gold	
1971	Chet Atkins and Jerry Reed	Me & Chet "All I Ever Need Is You"	A	-	24	-	-	-	-	-	
1971	Ray Sanders	All I Ever Need Is You	S	-	18	-	-	-	-	-	
1972	Tompall & the Glaser Bros.	Rings & Things "Rings"	A	-	33	-	-	-	-	-	
1972	Ray Charles	Through the Eyes of Love "If You Wouldn’t Be My Lady"	A	186	-	-	-	-	-	-	
1973	Charlie Rich	Behind Closed Doors "If You Wouldn’t Be My Lady"	A	8	1	-	-	-	4	4× Platinum	
1974	Lobo	Rings	S	43	-	-	8	-	30	-	
1974	Reuben Howell	Rings	S	86	-	-	-	-	-	-	
1977	Sammi Smith	Mixed Emotions "All I Ever Need Is You"	A	-	47	-	-	-	-	-	
1977	Twiggy	Please Get My Name Right "Rings"	A	-	-	-	-	35	-	-	
1979	Kenny Rogers & Dottie West	All I Ever Need Is You	S	102	1	-	38	-	-	-	
1979	Kenny Rogers & Dottie West	Classics "All I Ever Need Is You"	A	82	3	-	-	-	60	Platinum	
1984	Andre Hazes	All I Ever Need Is You	S	-	-	-	-	-	-	-	#1 in the Netherlands; Dutch title: "Ik meen ‘t"
1984	Kenny Rogers & Dottie West	Duets "All I Ever Need Is You"	A	85	43	-	-	-	64	Platinum	
2004	Kenny Rogers	42 Ultimate Hits "All I Ever Need Is You"	A	39	6	-	-	-	-	Gold	
2006	Kenny Rogers	21 Number Ones "All I Ever Need Is You"	A	24	6	-	-	-	-	Gold	
2006	Alan Jackson	Like Red on a Rose "Don’t Change On Me"	A	4	1	-	-	177	8	Gold	
