= Talkin' to the Moon =

Single by Larry Gatlin & the Gatlin Brothers

from the album Partners
- B-side: "Give Me a Chance"
- Released: November 1986
- Genre: Bluegrass, country rock
- Length: 3:32
- Label: Columbia
- Songwriter(s): Larry Gatlin
- Producer(s): Chip Young

Larry Gatlin & the Gatlin Brothers singles chronology
"She Used to Be Somebody's Baby" (1986)	"Talkin' to the Moon" (1986)	"From Time to Time (It Feels Like Love Again)" (1987)

"Talkin' to the Moon" is a song written by Larry Gatlin, and recorded by American country music group Larry Gatlin & the Gatlin Brothers. It was released in November 1986 as the second single from their album Partners. The song peaked at number 4 on the Billboard Hot Country Singles chart.

== Chart performance ==
Chart (1986–1987)	Peak position
US Hot Country Songs (Billboard)	4
Canadian RPM Country Tracks	3
