= Changin' Partners =

Single by Larry Gatlin & the Gatlin Brothers

from the album Partners
- B-side: "Got a Lot of Woman on His Hands"
- Released: August 15, 1987
- Genre: Country
- Length: 3:18
- Label: Columbia
- Songwriter(s): Larry Gatlin
- Producer(s): Chip Young

Larry Gatlin & the Gatlin Brothers singles chronology
"From Time to Time (It Feels Like Love Again)" (1987)	"Changin' Partners" (1987)	"Love of a Lifetime" (1988)

"Changin' Partners" is a song written by Larry Gatlin, and recorded by American country music group Larry Gatlin & the Gatlin Brothers. It was released in August 1987 as the fourth single from the album Partners. The song reached number 16 on the Billboard Hot Country Singles & Tracks chart.

== Chart performance ==
Chart (1987)	Peak position
US Hot Country Songs (Billboard)	16
Canadian RPM Country Tracks	30
