= All I Ever Need Is You (song) =

Single by Sonny & Cher

from the album All I Ever Need Is You
- B-side: "I Got You Babe (live)"
- Released: October 1971
- Recorded: 1971
- Genre: Pop
- Length: 2:38
- Label: Kapp/MCA
- Songwriters: Jimmy Holiday, Eddie Reeves
- Producer: Snuff Garrett

Sonny & Cher singles chronology
| "It's The Little Things" (1967) | "All I Ever Need Is You" (1971) | "A Cowboy's Work Is Never Done" (1972) |

"All I Ever Need Is You" is a popular song written by Jimmy Holiday and Eddie Reeves, and initially recorded by Ray Charles for his 1971 album, Volcanic Action of My Soul. The most well-known version of the song is the hit single by Sonny & Cher which, in 1971, reached No. 7 on the U.S. Billboard Hot 100, and was their single of greatest chart longevity, spending 15 weeks on that chart. Their album by the same title sold over 500,000 copies reaching RIAA gold status.

"All I Ever Need Is You" by Sonny & Cher also topped the U.S. Easy Listening chart for five weeks late in 1971. It was a top-ten single in both the United Kingdom and Canada. It has sold more than 2,250,000 copies worldwide.

Two versions made the country music charts: Ray Sanders (No. 18) in 1971, and Kenny Rogers and Dottie West (No. 1) in 1979. The Rogers and West recording was included on four albums: Classics in 1979 selling over 2,000,000 copies; Duets in 1984 selling over 1,000,000 copies; 42 Ultimate Hits in 2004 selling over 500,000 copies and 21 Number Ones in 2006 selling over 500,000 copies.

A 1984 Dutch version titled “Ik Meen ‘t” by recording artist Andre Hazes reached No. 1 for two weeks on March 9 and 16, 1985 on the pop singles chart in the Netherlands.

“All I Ever Need Is You” was associated with three Grammy Award nominations: 1972 Grammy Award for Best Pop Performance by a Duo or Group with Vocals, Sonny & Cher, "All I Ever Need Is You"; 1973 “Best Country Instrumental Performance”, Chet Atkins & Jerry Reed, Me and Chet (the album included “All I Ever Need Is You”). and 1980 Best Country Vocal Performance by a Duo or Group, Kenny Rogers & Dottie West, for the single "All I Ever Need Is You". The song was also recorded by Tom Jones, Sammi Smith and several others.

It was recorded by Belgian artist Joe Harris for his live album '25 years Joe Harris' in 1980. The song was a duet with Chrissy.

== Chart performance ==
=== Weekly charts ===
| Chart (1971–1972) | Peak position |
|---|---|
| Australia (Kent Music Report) | 31 |
| Belgian Singles Chart | 20 |
| Canadian RPM Top Singles | 5 |
| Irish Singles Chart | 12 |
| Malaysian Singles Chart | 2 |
| Quebec (ADISQ) | 7 |
| UK Singles Chart | 8 |
| US Billboard Hot 100 | 7 |
| US Billboard Adult Contemporary | 1 |
| US Cash Box Top 100 | 6 |

=== Ray Sanders ===
| Chart (1971) | Peak position |
|---|---|
| US Billboard Hot Country Singles | 18 |

=== Overlanders ===
| Chart (1974) | Peak position |
|---|---|
| Canada RPM Adult Contemporary | 26 |

=== Kenny Rogers and Dottie West ===
| Chart (1979) | Peak position |
|---|---|
| US Hot Country Songs (Billboard) | 1 |
| US Billboard Hot 100 | 102 |
| US Billboard Adult Contemporary | 38 |
| Canadian RPM Country Tracks | 2 |

=== Year-end charts ===
| Chart (1971) | Peak position |
|---|---|
| US (Joel Whitburn's Pop Annual) | 68 |

| Chart (1972) | Rank |
|---|---|
| UK Singles Chart | 94 |
| US Cash Box | 23 |
| US Billboard Top Easy Listening Singles | 7 |
