= LaDonna Gatlin =

American motivational speaker and singer

- Born: August 18, 1954 (age 72)
- Education: Odessa College
- Occupations: Motivational speaker Musician
- Spouse: Tim Johnson
- Children: 2
- Website: www.ladonnagatlin.com

LaDonna Gatlin (born August 18, 1954) is an American motivational speaker and singer who shared a Dove Award and a Grammy Award.

== Early years ==
Gatlin was born on August 18, 1954, in Abilene, Texas, the daughter of Curley and Billie Gatlin. She and her brothers, Larry, Rudy, and Steve, performed as The Gatlins. The siblings developed their musical skills at home as their mother played piano. Gatlin earned an associate's degree in speech and communications from Odessa College. In 1973, she won the Miss West Texas title and represented that part of the state in the Miss Texas competition.

== Career ==
The Gatlins' harmonizing took them from winning first prize at a local talent show to performing at the New York World's Fair in 1964. The group made record albums, and she shared in the Grammy Award for "Broken Lady" (1976).

Making a transition to Christian music, Gatlin became featured vocalist with the Blackwood Singers in 1974. In the mid-1970s, she and her husband, Tim Johnson, were founding members of Praise, the gospel-music group that backed Dallas Holm in concerts and on record albums. In 1978, their recording of "Rise Again" won a Dove Award from the Gospel Music Association, and Praise was named mixed group of the year in Dove Award competition.

Gatlin withdrew from performing in 1976 to focus on her family, spending time with her son and daughter for the next 20 years. She also worked in a ministry to women on death row. After raising her children, Gatlin returned to public life, this time on her own. She combines motivational speaking with music, the latter including country, gospel, patriotic, and popular genres. Through the mix of musical and spoken messages, she said, "I want to touch the lives of other people for good, and hopefully they will see God in me." In 1991, Gatlin rejoined her brothers for a Christmas tour.

Gatlin also is a writer, contributing to the Chicken Soup for the Soul series. She and Mike Marino wrote the book The Song in You: Finding Your Voice, Redefining Your Life (Health Communications, Inc., 2012).

== Personal life ==
Gatlin married Tim Johnson, a minister, and they have two children.

== Recognition ==
Gatlin was inducted into the Speakers Hall of Fame in 2005, and she received the Council of Peers Award for Excellence in recognition of professionalism and excellence in speaking.
