= Come See Me and Come Lonely =

Single by Dottie West

from the album Dottie
- B-side: "Decorate Your Conscience"
- Released: May 1978
- Studio: Jack Clement Recording (Nashville, Tennessee)
- Genre: Country
- Label: United Artists
- Songwriter(s): Red Lane
- Producer(s): Larry Butler

Dottie West singles chronology
"Every Time Two Fools Collide" (1978)	"Come See Me and Come Lonely" (1978)	"Anyone Who Isn't Me Tonight" (1978)

"Come See Me and Come Lonely" is a song written by Red Lane, and recorded by American country music artist Dottie West. It was released in May 1978 as the first single from the album Dottie. The song peaked at number 17 on the Billboard Hot Country Singles chart. In addition, "Come See Me and Come Lonely" peaked at number 28 on the Canadian RPM Country chart. Later in the year, the single was released onto West's 1978 album entitled Dottie. It was the only single released from the album.

In 2017, Pam Tillis and Lorrie Morgan covered the song on their duets album of the same name.

== Chart performance ==
Chart (1978)	Peak position
US Hot Country Songs (Billboard)	17
CAN RPM Country Songs	28
