= Love Is Just a Game (album) =

Studio album by Larry Gatlin
- Released: 1977
- Studio: Creative Workshop, Nashville; American Studios, Nashville
- Genre: Country
- Label: Monument
- Producer: Fred Foster

Larry Gatlin chronology
Larry Gatlin with Family and Friends (1976)	Love Is Just a Game (1977)	Oh Brother (1978)

Love Is Just a Game is the fifth studio album by American country music singer Larry Gatlin issued on Monument Records in 1977. The album reached number 7 on the Billboard Top Country Albums chart and the title track single "Love Is Just a Game" reached number 3 on the Billboard Hot Country Singles chart and number 6 on the RPM Country Tracks chart in Canada.

== Track listing ==
All songs written by Larry Gatlin.

Side 1

1. "Love Is Just a Game" – 3:30
2. "Tomorrow" – 2:32
3. "Anything but Leavin'" – 2:44
4. "If Practice Makes Perfect" – 3:27
5. "Everytime a Plane Flies Over Our House" – 2:59

Side 2

1. "I Just Wish You Were Someone I Love" – 3:10
2. "Kiss It All Goodbye" – 2:41
3. "I Don't Wanna Cry" – 2:46
4. "It's Love at Last" – 2:56
5. "Steps" – 3:03
6. "Alleluia" – 2:00

== Personnel ==
- Grady Martin, Reggie Young, Johnny Christopher, Jimmy Colvard, Jerry Steve Smith, Pete Wade, Steve Gatlin, Rudy Gatlin – guitar
- Gene Chrisman, Phillip Fajardo – drums
- Tommy Cogbill – bass
- Bobby Emmons, Bobby Wood, Shane Keister, William Golden – keyboards
- Lloyd Green, Michael G. Smith – steel guitar
- Farrell Morris – percussion
- Lisa Silver – fiddle
- Sheldon Kurland, Carl Gorodetzky, Lennie Haight, George Binkley, Steven Smith, Christian Teal, Marvin Chantry, Gary Vanosdale, Byron Bach, Roy Christensen, Wilfred Lehmann, Ann Migliore – strings
- Bill Justis – string arrangements

Production

- Produced by Fred Foster
- Brent Maher and Don Cobb – engineer
- Ken Kim – photography, art direction
