= What Are We Doin' Lonesome =

Single by Larry Gatlin & the Gatlin Brothers

from the album Not Guilty
- B-side: "You Wouldn't Know Love"
- Released: October 3, 1981
- Genre: Country
- Length: 2:40
- Label: Columbia
- Songwriter(s): Larry Gatlin

Larry Gatlin & the Gatlin Brothers singles chronology
"Wind Is Bound to Change" (1981)	"What Are We Doin' Lonesome" (1981)	"In Like with Each Other" (1982)

"What Are We Doin' Lonesome" is a song written by Larry Gatlin, and recorded by American country music group Larry Gatlin & the Gatlin Brothers. It was released in October 1981, as the first single from the album Not Guilty. The song reached number 4 on the Billboard Hot Country Singles & Tracks chart.

== Chart performance ==
Chart (1981–1982)	Peak position
US Hot Country Songs (Billboard)	4
Canadian RPM Country Tracks	28
