= Taking Somebody with Me When I Fall =

Single by Larry Gatlin & the Gatlin Brothers

from the album Straight Ahead
- B-side: "Piece by Piece"
- Released: March 8, 1980
- Genre: Country
- Length: 3:23
- Label: Columbia
- Songwriter(s): Larry Gatlin
- Producer(s): Larry Gatlin, Rudy Gatlin, Steve Gatlin

Larry Gatlin & the Gatlin Brothers singles chronology
"The Midnight Choir" (1979)	"Taking Somebody with Me When I Fall" (1980)	"We're Number One" (1980)

"Taking Somebody with Me When I Fall" is a song written by Larry Gatlin, and recorded by American country music group Larry Gatlin & the Gatlin Brothers. It was released in March 1980 as the third single from the album Straight Ahead. The song reached number 12 on the Billboard Hot Country Singles & Tracks chart.

== Chart performance ==
Chart (1980)	Peak position
US Hot Country Songs (Billboard)	12
US Billboard Hot 100	108
Canadian RPM Country Tracks	15
