= The Lady Takes the Cowboy Everytime =

Single by Larry Gatlin & the Gatlin Brothers

from the album Houston to Denver
- B-side: "It's Me"
- Released: June 1984
- Genre: Country
- Length: 3:36
- Label: Columbia
- Songwriter(s): Larry Gatlin
- Producer(s): Rick Hall

Larry Gatlin & the Gatlin Brothers singles chronology
"Denver" (1984)	"The Lady Takes the Cowboy Everytime" (1984)	"Runaway Go Home" (1985)

"The Lady Takes the Cowboy Everytime" is a song written by Larry Gatlin, and recorded by American country music group Larry Gatlin & the Gatlin Brothers. It was released in June 1984 as the third single from their album Houston to Denver. The song reached number 3 on the Billboard Hot Country Singles chart in October 1984.

== Charts ==
=== Weekly charts ===
Chart (1984)	Peak position
US Hot Country Songs (Billboard)	3
Canadian RPM Country Tracks	2

=== Year-end charts ===
Chart (1984)	Position
US Hot Country Songs (Billboard)	36
