= Take Me to Your Lovin' Place =

Single by Larry Gatlin & the Gatlin Brothers

from the album Help Yourself
- B-side: "Straight to My Heart"
- Released: October 4, 1980
- Genre: Country
- Length: 2:44
- Label: Columbia
- Songwriter(s): Larry Gatlin

Larry Gatlin & the Gatlin Brothers singles chronology
"We're Number One" (1980)	"Take Me to Your Lovin' Place" (1980)	"It Don't Get No Better Than This" (1981)

"Take Me to Your Lovin' Place" is a song written by Larry Gatlin, and recorded by American country music group Larry Gatlin & the Gatlin Brothers. It was released in October 1980 as the first single from the album Help Yourself. They reached number 5 on the Billboard Hot Country Singles & Tracks chart.

== Chart performance ==
Chart (1980–1981)	Peak position
US Hot Country Songs (Billboard)	5
Canadian RPM Country Tracks	12
