= I Don't Wanna Cry (Larry Gatlin song) =

Single by Larry Gatlin

from the album Love Is Just a Game
- B-side: "Mercy River"
- Released: May 28, 1977
- Genre: Country
- Length: 2:49
- Label: Monument
- Songwriter(s): Larry Gatlin
- Producer(s): Larry Gatlin

Larry Gatlin singles chronology
| "Anything but Leavin'" (1977) | "I Don't Wanna Cry" (1977) | "Love Is Just a Game" (1977) |

"I Don't Wanna Cry" is a song written and recorded by American country music artist Larry Gatlin. It was released in May 1977 as the second single from the album Love Is Just a Game. The song reached number 3 on the Billboard Hot Country Singles & Tracks chart.

== Chart performance ==
| Chart (1977) | Peak position |
|---|---|
| US Hot Country Songs (Billboard) | 3 |
