= She Used to Be Somebody's Baby =

Single by Larry Gatlin & the Gatlin Brothers

from the album Partners
- B-side: "Being Alone"
- Released: July 1986
- Genre: Country
- Length: 3:17
- Label: Columbia
- Songwriter(s): Larry Gatlin
- Producer(s): Chip Young

Larry Gatlin & the Gatlin Brothers singles chronology
"Nothing but Your Love Matters" (1986)	"She Used to Be Somebody's Baby" (1986)	"Talkin' to the Moon" (1986)

"She Used to Be Somebody's Baby" is a song written by Larry Gatlin, and recorded by American country music group Larry Gatlin & the Gatlin Brothers. It was released in July 1986 as the first single from their album Partners. The song peaked at number 2 on the Billboard Hot Country Singles chart.

== Chart performance ==
Chart (1986)	Peak position
US Hot Country Songs (Billboard)	2
Canadian RPM Country Tracks	3
