= Anyone Who Isn't Me Tonight =

Single by Kenny Rogers and Dottie West

from the album Every Time Two Fools Collide
- B-side: "You and Me"
- Released: August 1978
- Studio: Jack Clement Recording (Nashville, Tennessee)
- Genre: Country
- Length: 2:22
- Label: United Artists
- Songwriter(s): Julie Didier, Casey Kelly
- Producer(s): Larry Butler

Dottie West singles chronology
"Come See Me and Come Lonely" (1978)	"Anyone Who Isn't Me Tonight" (1978)	"Reaching Out to Hold You" (1978)

Kenny Rogers singles chronology
"Love or Something Like It" (1978)	"Anyone Who Isn't Me Tonight" (1978)	"The Gambler" (1978)

"Anyone Who Isn't Me Tonight" is a song written by Julie Didier and Casey Kelly, and recorded by American country music artists Kenny Rogers and Dottie West. It was released in August 1978 as the second single from the album Every Time Two Fools Collide. The song peaked at number 2 on the Billboard Hot Country Singles chart. The song also peaked at number 10 on the RPM Country Tracks chart that year.

== Chart performance ==
Chart (1978)	Peak position
US Hot Country Songs (Billboard)	2
CAN RPM Country Singles	10
