= Night Time Magic =

Single by Larry Gatlin

from the album Oh Brother
- B-side: "Do It Again Tonight"
- Released: April 15, 1978
- Genre: Country
- Length: 2:34
- Label: Monument
- Songwriter(s): Larry Gatlin
- Producer(s): Larry Gatlin

Larry Gatlin singles chronology
"I Just Wish You Were Someone I Love" (1978)	"Night Time Magic" (1978)	"Do It Again Tonight" (1978)

"Night Time Magic" is a song written and recorded by American country music artist Larry Gatlin. It was released in April 1978 as the first single from his album Oh Brother. The song peaked at number 2 on the Billboard Hot Country Singles chart. It also reached number 1 on the RPM Country Tracks chart in Canada.

== Chart performance ==
Chart (1978)	Peak position
US Hot Country Songs (Billboard)	2
Canadian RPM Country Tracks	1
