= I Just Wish You Were Someone I Love =

Single by Larry Gatlin

from the album Love Is Just a Game
- B-side: "Kiss It All Goodbye"
- Released: November 1977
- Genre: Country
- Length: 3:10
- Label: Monument
- Songwriter(s): Larry Gatlin
- Producer(s): Larry Gatlin

Larry Gatlin singles chronology
"Love Is Just a Game" (1977)	"I Just Wish You Were Someone I Love" (1977)	"Night Time Magic" (1978)

"I Just Wish You Were Someone I Love" is a song written and recorded by American country music artist Larry Gatlin. It was released in November 1977 as the fourth single from the album Love Is Just a Game. The song was Gatlin's sixth and most successful single on the country chart. The single went to number one on the country chart, where it stayed for a single week and spent a total of eleven weeks on the country chart.

== Chart performance ==
Chart (1977–1978)	Peak position
US Hot Country Songs (Billboard)	1
Canadian RPM Country Tracks	3
