= Broken Lady =

Single by Larry Gatlin

from the album High Time
- B-side: "The Heart"
- Released: November 1975
- Genre: Countrypolitan
- Length: 3:01
- Label: Monument
- Songwriter(s): Larry Gatlin
- Producer(s): Fred Foster

Larry Gatlin singles chronology
"Delta Dirt" (1974)	"Broken Lady" (1975)	"Warm and Tender" (1976)

"Broken Lady" is a song written and recorded by American country music artist Larry Gatlin. It was released in November 1975 as the first single from the album High Time, (also appearing as the title track of the British release of Larry Gatlin with Family & Friends) The song was Gatlin's second big hit on the Hot Country Songs chart, charting at number 5. The song won him a Grammy Award in 1976 for Best Country Song.

== Cover versions ==
The song was later covered by Dottie West for her 1978 studio album Dottie.

== Chart performance ==
Chart (1975–1976)	Peak position
US Hot Country Songs (Billboard)	5
Canadian RPM Country Tracks	5
