= Houston (Means I'm One Day Closer to You) =

Single by Larry Gatlin & The Gatlin Brothers

from the album Houston to Denver
- B-side: "Whole Wide World Stood Still"
- Released: September 1983
- Genre: Country
- Length: 2:56
- Label: Columbia
- Songwriter(s): Larry Gatlin
- Producer(s): Larry Gatlin

Larry Gatlin & The Gatlin Brothers singles chronology
"Easy on the Eye" (1983)	"Houston (Means I'm One Day Closer to You)" (1983)	"Denver" (1984)

"Houston (Means I'm One Day Closer to You)" is a song written by Larry Gatlin and recorded by American country music group Larry Gatlin & the Gatlin Brothers. It was released in September 1983 as the first single from the album Houston to Denver. The song was their third and last number-one on the country chart. The single went to number one for two weeks and spent a total of 15 weeks on the country chart.

== Recording ==
According to the album liner notes, this song was recorded before the rest of the album and was the only song on the album to be produced by and feature guitar from Larry Gatlin. The remainder of the album was produced by Rick Hall.

=== Personnel ===
According to the album liner notes.

Larry Gatlin and the Gatlin Brothers

- Larry Gatlin – lead vocals, guitar, producer
- Steve Gatlin – harmony and backing vocals
- Rudy Gatlin – harmony and backing vocals

Additional musicians and production staff

- Billy Sanford – lead guitar
- Leon Rhodes – lead guitar
- Buddy Emmons – pedal steel guitar
- Bob Moore – bass
- Mitch Humphries – keyboard
- Larrie Londin – drums
- Buddy Spicher – fiddle
- Ernie Winfrey – engineer

== Chart performance ==
Chart (1983)	Peak position
US Hot Country Songs (Billboard)	1
Canadian RPM Country Tracks	1
