= All the Gold in California =

Single by Larry Gatlin & the Gatlin Brothers

from the album Straight Ahead
- B-side: "How Much Is a Man Supposed to Take"
- Released: August 1979
- Studio: Monument Recording (Nashville, Tennessee)
- Genre: Country
- Length: 2:37
- Label: Columbia
- Songwriter: Larry Gatlin
- Producers: Larry Gatlin, Steve Gatlin, Rudy Gatlin

Larry Gatlin & the Gatlin Brothers singles chronology
"I've Done Enough Dyin' Today" (1978)	"All the Gold in California" (1979)	"The Midnight Choir" (1979)

"All the Gold in California" is a song written by Larry Gatlin, and recorded by American country music group Larry Gatlin & the Gatlin Brothers. It was released in August 1979 as the first single from the album Straight Ahead. The song was the first of two number one singles for Larry Gatlin & the Gatlin Brothers Band. The single stayed at number one for two weeks and spent a total of ten weeks on the chart.

== Content ==
This song was written while Larry was in a traffic jam in Los Angeles. The song goes on to warn the listener that all the gold in the state "is in a bank in the middle of Beverly Hills in somebody else's name". Also, that attempting to make it big in California carries a risk of failure that could personally devastate one's resolve. On January 19, 1985, Larry Gatlin & the Gatlin Brothers Band sang the song at the nationally televised 50th Presidential Inaugural Gala, the day before the second presidential inauguration of Ronald Reagan. This song is a major example of a contemporary use of Shakespeare's quote, "all that glitters is not gold."

== Chart performance ==
Chart (1979)	Peak position
US Hot Country Songs (Billboard)	1
Canadian RPM Country Tracks	2
