= Jimmy Holiday =

American R&B singer-songwriter (1934–1987)

Jimmy Holiday (July 24, 1934 – February 15, 1987) was an American R&B singer and songwriter.

Holiday was born in Sallis, Mississippi, United States. He recorded for Everest Records in the 1960s and later moved to the New Orleans label Minit Records. His first recording "How Can I Forget" reached the top ten on the US Billboard R&B chart in 1963. His debut album Turning Point peaked at No. 25 on the Billboard R&B albums chart in 1966.

Holiday's best-known composition is "Put a Little Love in Your Heart," co-written with Jackie DeShannon and Randy Myers. In the United States, it was DeShannon's highest-charting hit, reaching No. 4 on the Billboard Hot 100 in August 1969 and No. 2 on the Adult Contemporary chart. In late 1969, the song reached No. 1 on South Africa's hit parade.

Holiday died in 1987 in Iowa City of heart failure.

== Discography ==
=== Albums ===
- 1966: Turning Point (Minit Records)
- 1970: Spread Your Love (Minit Records)
- 1975: United Artists Music Publishing Group Present Songs of Jackie DeShannon, Jimmy Holiday, Eddie Reeves (United Artists Records)

=== Singles ===
Title	Year	US	US R&B
"How Can I Forget"	1963	57	8
"Baby I Love You"	1966	98	21
"Everybody Needs Help"	1967		36
"Spread Your Love"	1968		35

=== Notable compositions ===
- "Put a Little Love in Your Heart" (Jackie DeShannon, 1969)
- "All I Ever Need Is You" (Ray Charles, 1971)
