= Love or Something Like It (song) =

Single by Kenny Rogers

from the album Love or Something Like It
- B-side: "Starting Again"
- Released: May 29, 1978
- Studio: Jack Clement Recording (Nashville, Tennessee)
- Genre: Country
- Length: 2:55
- Label: United Artists
- Songwriters: Kenny Rogers; Steve Glassmeyer
- Producer: Larry Butler

Kenny Rogers singles chronology
"Every Time Two Fools Collide" (1978)	"Love or Something Like It" (1978)	"Anyone Who Isn't Me Tonight" (1978)

"Love or Something Like It" is a song co-written and recorded by American country music artist Kenny Rogers. It was released in May 1978 as the first single and title track from the album Love or Something Like It. The song was written by Rogers and Steven Glassmeyer (a member of Rogers's backing band) and was Kenny Rogers's third number one on the country chart. The single stayed at number one for one week and spent a total of ten weeks on the country chart.

== Chart performance ==
Chart (1978)	Peak position
US Billboard Hot 100	32
US Hot Country Songs (Billboard)	1
US Easy Listening (Billboard)	12
Canadian RPM Top Singles	36
Canadian RPM Country Tracks	1
Canadian RPM Adult Contemporary Tracks	3
