= Every Time Two Fools Collide (song) =

Single by Kenny Rogers & Dottie West

from the album Every Time Two Fools Collide
- B-side: "We Love Each Other"
- Released: January 1978
- Recorded: 1977
- Studio: Jack Clement Recording (Nashville, Tennessee)
- Genre: Country
- Length: 2:59
- Label: United Artists
- Songwriters: Jan Dyer, Jeff Tweel
- Producer: Larry Butler

Kenny Rogers singles chronology
"Sweet Music Man" (1977)	"Every Time Two Fools Collide" (1978)	"Love or Something Like It" (1978)

Dottie West singles chronology
"Tonight You Belong to Me" (1977)	"Every Time Two Fools Collide" (1978)	"Come See Me and Come Lonely" (1978)

"Every Time Two Fools Collide" is a song written by Jan Dyer and Jeff Tweel and recorded by American country music artists Kenny Rogers and Dottie West. It was released in January 1978 as the first single and title track from the album Every Time Two Fools Collide. The song reached number one on the Billboard Hot Country Singles chart that spring, and established Rogers and West as a popular male-female duo pairing in country music.

== History ==
"Every Time Two Fools Collide" was meant to be recorded only by Dottie West, as a follow-up to her previous hits from 1977 under her new record company United Artists. Kenny Rogers was under the same label as West at the time, and they were both being produced under Larry Butler. According to legend, West was recording the song in the United Artists studio, when Rogers turned up early to meet West. However, Rogers disputed this. According to him, West was supposed to have finished recording material at 10:00 am, and Rogers was to have started at the same time. When West's session ran over, Rogers ended up sitting in the studio waiting. They began talking about recording a duet, and West suggested "Every Time Two Fools Collide". They both agreed, and together West and Rogers made the song a duet recording. Producer Larry Butler told another version of the event in a 2006 interview. He claims that after Rogers had turned up to the studio, West approached Rogers, saying she was a fan of his music and that she would consider it an honor to record with him someday. Butler then claimed that Rogers asked if he had any material he felt they could do together and told Rogers to sing the second verse of "Everytime Two Fools Collide".

Released in early 1978, the song hit number one on the Hot Country Songs list that year, for two weeks, and was West's first number one and one of Rogers' many number ones. The song became one of the pair's best-known songs, and also became one of country music's classic duet recordings. That year, they released an album of the same name, which became a Gold-certified album. Their association lasted three years, setting the trend for a string of country hits, including 1981's "What Are We Doin' in Love". Thanks in part to the success of this song, Rogers and West won the CMA Awards' coveted Vocal Duo of the Year award later that year.

In 2004, CMT hosted a duets special titled, 100 Greatest Duets. "Every Time Two Fools Collide" was listed among their top-10 list, and was also performed on their special. However, country singer Lee Ann Womack took the place of West's part in the song, as West died in an automobile accident in September 1991. Although they had not recorded together for some time prior to her death, Rogers and West maintained a close friendship. In his autobiography, Rogers recalls the last time he saw West was at the hospital after her fatal accident, stating that while she was believed to be unconscious, he nevertheless carried out a (one-sided) conversation with her hoping she could hear him.

== Chart performance ==
Chart (1978)	Peak position
US Hot Country Songs (Billboard)	1
US Billboard Hot 100	101
US Adult Contemporary (Billboard)	44
Canadian RPM Country Tracks	1
Canadian RPM Adult Contemporary Tracks	12
