= Larry Gatlin & the Gatlin Brothers =

American country music group

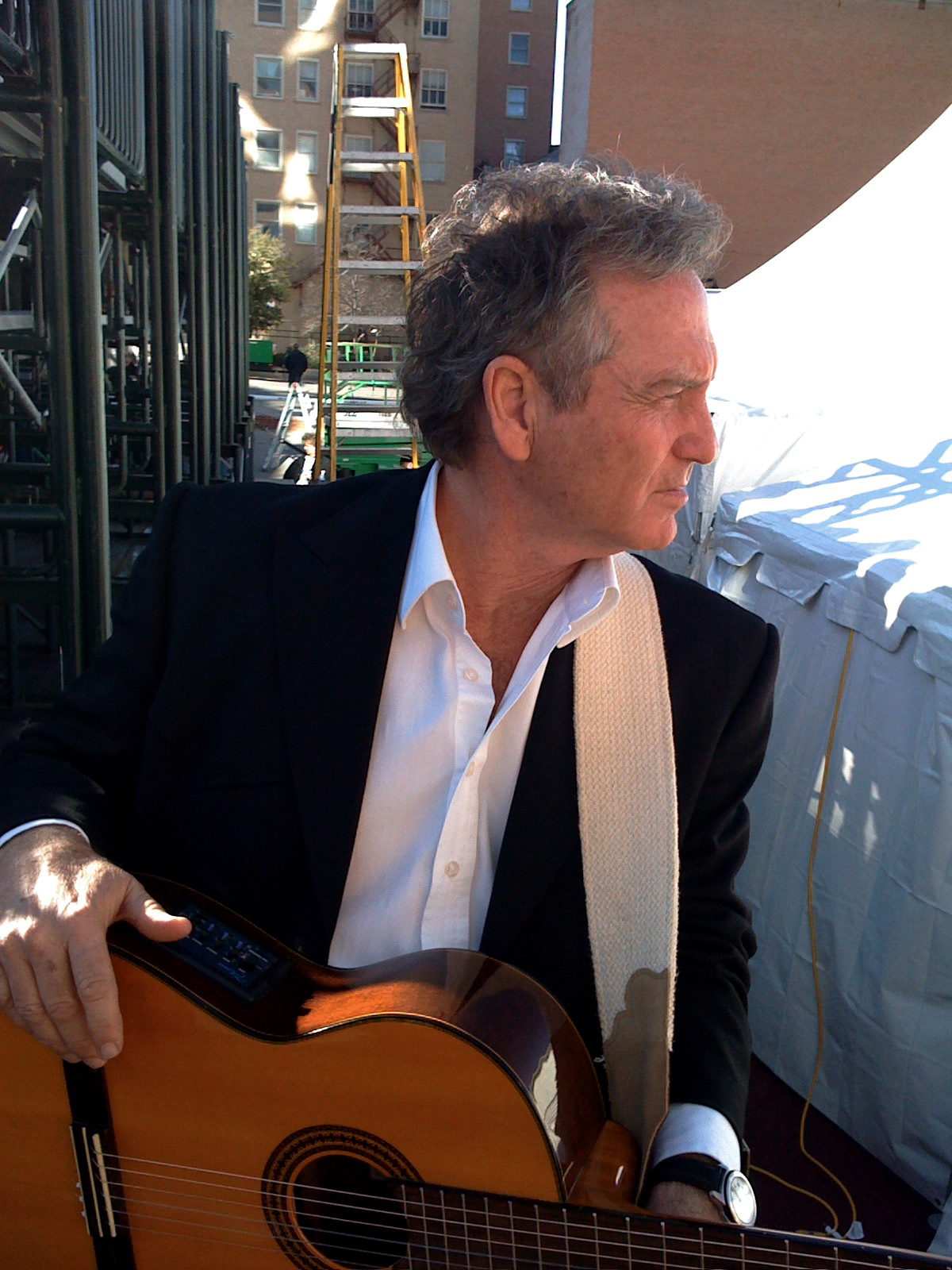
- Larry Gatlin in 2009

Background information
- Origin: Seminole, Texas, U.S.
- Genres: Country; gospel
- Years active: 1973–present
- Labels: Monument; Columbia; Universal; Capitol; Curb
- Members: Larry Gatlin; Rudy Gatlin; Steve Gatlin

Larry Gatlin & the Gatlin Brothers are an American country music vocal group. The group consists of lead singer Larry Gatlin (born May 2, 1948) and his brothers, Rudy and Steve Gatlin. The group achieved considerable success within the country music genre, performing on 33 top 40 country singles.

The group is known for Larry's tenor voice and for the country songs that they recorded in the 1970s and 1980s. Some of Gatlin's greatest hits include "Broken Lady", "All the Gold in California", "Houston (Means I'm One Day Closer to You)", "She Used to Be Somebody's Baby" and "Night Time Magic". During this time, country music trended toward slick pop-music arrangements in a style that came to be known as Countrypolitan. Gatlin and the Gatlin Brothers came to prominence and enjoyed their greatest success during this period with hit singles that showcased the brothers' rich gospel-inflected harmonies and Larry's poetic lyrics.

== Early life ==
Larry Wayne Gatlin was born in Seminole in Gaines County, Texas, United States, next to the New Mexico border. His father was an oilfield worker, and the family lived in several locations while he was a youth, including Abilene and Odessa. He was reared listening to country and Southern gospel music. He has performed with his brothers Steve and Rudy since childhood. When they were younger, they often sang at their local church along with their sister LaDonna and occasionally performed on local radio and television shows. They also recorded a gospel music album for the Sword and Shield label and topped Roy Orbison in a local talent contest.

Gatlin was a quarterback at Odessa High School. After graduation in 1966, he was eligible to serve in the military during the Vietnam War, but he chose to attend the University of Houston. As a wide receiver on the football team, he caught a touchdown pass in a 1968 game in which his team scored 100 points.

He later auditioned for and joined the gospel music group the Imperials. The Imperials went on to perform in Las Vegas in January 1971 at Jimmy Dean's Las Vegas Revue. While walking through the showroom, Gatlin caught country singer Dottie West's attention, who thought that he resembled Mickey Newbury. West was impressed with Gatlin's songwriting skills, and she recorded two of his compositions, "You're the Other Half of Me" and "Once You Were Mine". West also passed one of Gatlin's demo tapes around Nashville, Tennessee, and arranged for him to relocate there by purchasing a plane ticket for him. West recorded other compositions by Gatlin that would later become hits for him, including "Broken Lady", which appeared on West's 1978 album Dottie.

=== As a solo artist ===
With West's help, Gatlin found work in Nashville as a background singer for Kris Kristofferson. In 1973, Gatlin landed a solo recording contract with Monument Records.

In December 1973, Gatlin released his first album, The Pilgrim. Two singles were released from the album: "Sweet Becky Walker" and "Bitter They Are, Harder They Fall", although both failed to chart. The latter song was recorded by Elvis Presley in 1976 (who had also recorded Gatlin's "Help Me" in 1973). 1974 saw the release of a new album, Rain/Rainbow, and the song "Delta Dirt". The album and single proved more successful; "Delta Dirt" was a top-20 country hit, peaking at number 14. The song was also Gatlin's only entry into the pop charts, when it reached number 84. In 1975, Gatlin had his first major hit with his composition "Broken Lady", which reached number five on the Hot Country Songs chart in 1976 and won him a Grammy Award for Best Country Song. A new album, High Time, was released in 1976. Gatlin is also credited on guitar on Willie Nelson's 1976 album The Troublemaker.

Brothers Steve and Rudy made their first appearance on Larry's 1976 album Larry Gatlin with Family & Friends. They were featured on some of Gatlin's other hits during the late 1970s, notably "I Don't Wanna Cry", "Love Is Just a Game" and "Statues Without Hearts". In 1978, Gatlin scored his first number-one hit with "I Just Wish You Were Someone I Love". In 1978, he released his last solo album, Oh Brother, which featured the top-10 hits "I've Done Enough Dyin' Today" and "Night Time Magic". The latter song reached the Billboard Easy Listening chart. Both songs spotlighted Gatlin's soaring falsetto that became a trademark of his vocal style.

In 1985, Gatlin purchased shares in the Nashville Sounds, a Minor League Baseball team of the Triple-A American Association.

=== With the Gatlin Brothers ===
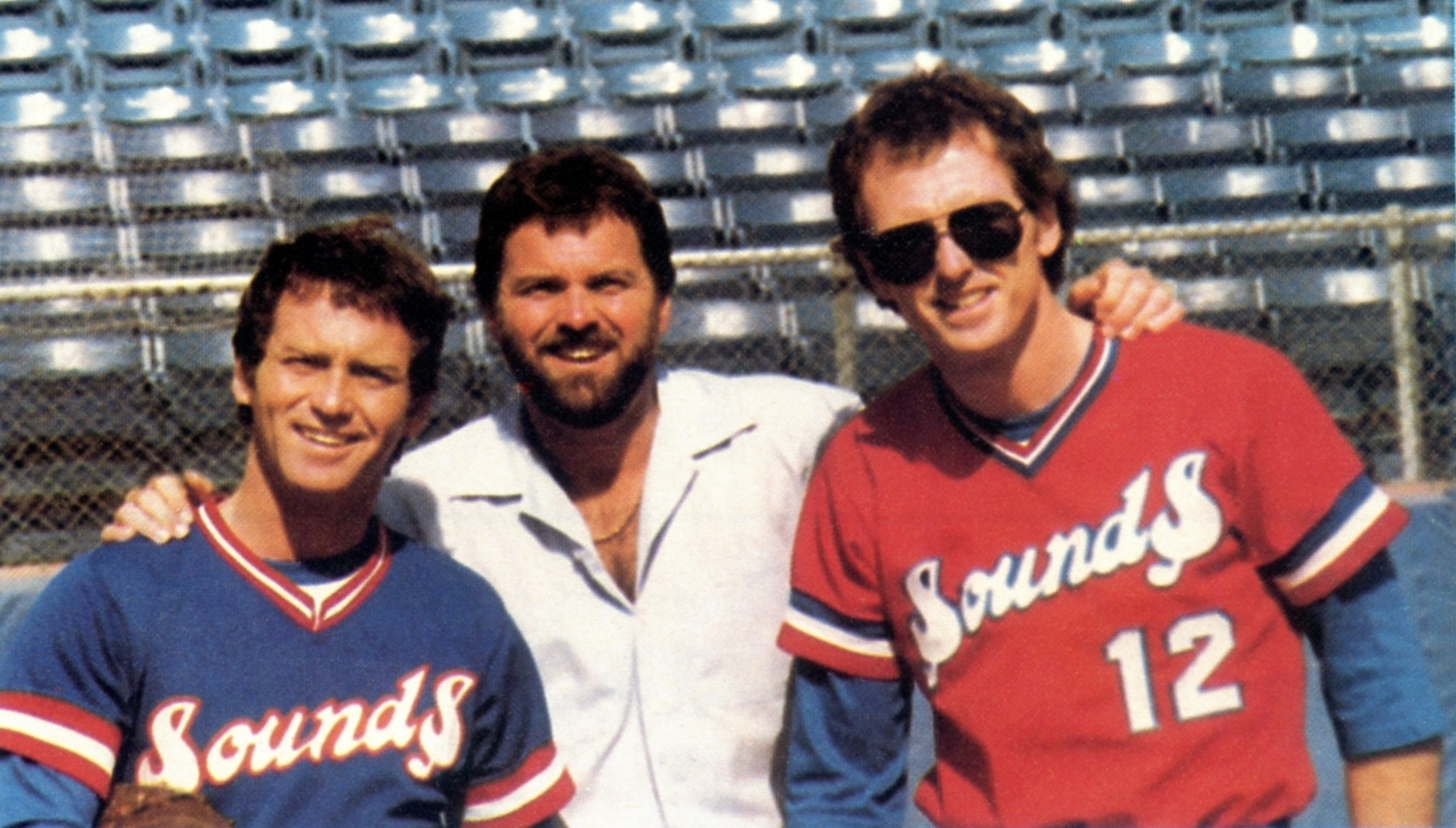
The Gatlin Brothers in the uniforms of the Nashville Sounds in 1985 (from left to right: Larry, Steve and Rudy)

In 1979, when Gatlin signed with Columbia Records, he decided to officially have his brothers billed as Larry Gatlin & the Gatlin Brothers. In October, they released the album Straight Ahead. It spawned the single "All the Gold in California", which became their greatest hit together, reaching number one on the Hot Country Songs list. This was Gatlin's second number-one hit, and he was named Top Male Vocalist of the Year by the Academy of Country Music. On June 6, 1980, Straight Ahead was certified gold.

The group's next big hit came in early 1980 with "Take Me to Your Lovin' Place", which peaked at number five in 1981. They next released "What Are We Doin' Lonesome", which peaked at number four later in the year. They continued with top-10 and top-20 hits such as "In Like with Each Other" (1982), "She Used to Sing on Sunday" (1982), "Sure Feels Like Love" (1982), "Almost Called Her Baby by Mistake" (1983) and "Denver" (1984). In 1983, the group released their third and last number-one hit, "Houston (Means I'm One Day Closer to You)". That year they also provided backing for Kenny Rogers on his hit single "Buried Treasure," though it is often mistaken the vocals were of The Bee Gees who wrote the song for Rogers' album Eyes That See in the Dark.

On January 19, 1985, the Gatlin Brothers sang "All the Gold in California" at the nationally televised second inauguration gala for Ronald Reagan. Though the group never achieved another number-one hit, they continued to chart for the remainder of the decade, including the hits "She Used to Be Somebody's Baby" (1986, number two), "Talkin' to the Moon" (1987, number four) and "Love of a Lifetime" (1988, number four).

The Gatlin Brothers were also one of the first country groups to appear in music videos, such as 1984's "The Lady Takes the Cowboy Everytime" [sic]. In 1985, Gatlin wrote the song "Indian Summer" with Barry Gibb, which he recorded as a duet with Roy Orbison. In 1989, the Gatlin Brothers sang "The Star-Spangled Banner" before Game 3 of the 1989 World Series at Candlestick Park in San Francisco just before the Loma Prieta earthquake occurred. They also sang the national anthem at Game 5 of the 1985 World Series and Game 6 of the 2005 NBA Finals.

=== Later work ===
Gatlin's chart success declined greatly when a new breed of neotraditional country singers entered Nashville around 1986. New stars such as Dwight Yoakam and Randy Travis pushed Gatlin and other Countrypolitan vocalists out of the top 10. Gatlin recorded a duet in 1987 with country-pop singer Janie Fricke, but the song reached only number 21. He briefly signed with Universal Records in 1989, where he recorded his last singles. His last charting single was released in 1989, titled "Number One Heartache Place". Gatlin underwent surgery on his vocal cords in 1991. In concert, he had begun to struggle with the high falsetto notes that were featured prominently in many of his songs. After recovery, Gatlin worked briefly with an opera coach to rebuild his voice, and his vocals took a powerful operatic style.

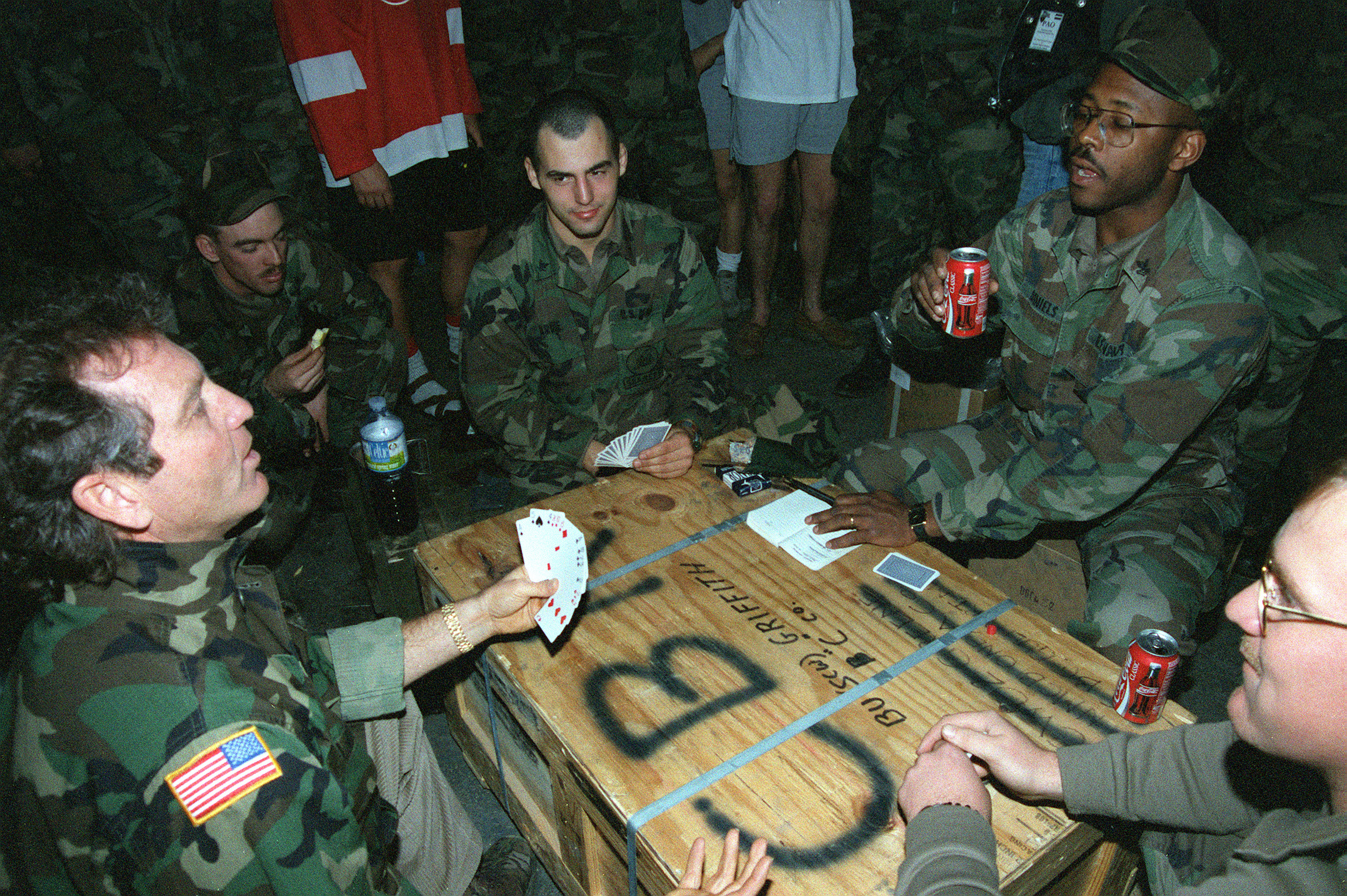
Gatlin (left) playing cards with Seabees in Croatia after a performance in 1995

After more than a decade of singing together, in December 1992, the Gatlin Brothers embarked on a farewell tour before retiring to their own theater in Myrtle Beach, South Carolina. Gatlin starred in the Broadway production of The Will Rogers Follies. In 1994, Gatlin and his brothers opened a 2,000-seat theater in Myrtle Beach. In 1995, he played himself in the television movie about Dottie West's life, Big Dreams & Broken Hearts: The Dottie West Story. West had been killed four years earlier in an automobile accident.

Along with celebrity biographer Jeff Lenburg, Gatlin wrote a memoir titled All the Gold in California that was published in 1998. In 1999, Gatlin toured and entertained troops of the 1st Cavalry Division in Bosnia.

Since 2010, Gatlin has contributed to Fox News Channel and Fox Business Network as a political and social commentator. In 2010, Gatlin acted as substitute host for Don Imus on Imus in the Morning and on Fox Across America with Spencer Hughes on March 16, 2011. He also hosts radio shows for WSM, including a weekly gospel program, and the Grand Ole Opry spinoff Opry Country Classics.

In 2023, Larry, Steve, and Rudy The Gatlin Brothers have released two new singles; "Fair Winds" and "Amazing' (What Just The Right 3 Minutes Can Do)."

== Sources ==
- Wood, Gerry. (1998). "The Gatlin Brothers". In The Encyclopedia of Country Music. Paul Kingsbury, Editor. New York: Oxford University Press. pp. 195–6.
