= Chris Campion =

British writer, journalist and filmmaker

Chris Campion is a British author, journalist, ghostwriter, editor, producer, and filmmaker. His work has been published in The Guardian, Telegraph, Los Angeles Times, Rolling Stone, Vice, and Dazed & Confused. He is the founder of reissue label Saint Cecilia Knows.

== Work ==
=== Journalism ===
From 1998 to 2004, Campion was a contributing editor and feature writer for Dazed & Confused magazine, for whom he interviewed artists, musicians, and other cultural figures, including writers Hunter S. Thompson, Hubert Selby Jr, and artists Panamarenko and Joe Coleman. He was also a regular contributor to Dazed's sister magazines, Another and Intersection. In 2002, Vice UK editor Andy Capper asked Campion to be one of the founding contributing editors of the British edition of Vice magazine.

He contributed long-form features, interviews, and reviews to Observer Music Monthly (OMM), a magazine supplement of The Observer newspaper, between 2004 and 2009. In 2005, on assignment for OMM, Campion went on tour in Norway with notorious Black metal band, Mayhem. It was the first time the group had ever toured with Attila Csihar, vocalist on their debut album, De Mysteriis Dom Sathanas. The resulting article, In the Face of Death, a survey of the Norwegian Black Metal scene, also included interviews with of Fenriz of Darkthrone, Bard Eithun, of Gorgoroth was published in February 2005. Other work for OMM included a survey of the J-Pop scene and its fan culture, and features on ukulele-playing troubadour Tiny Tim and The Mamas & the Papas founder and songwriter, John Phillips. Campion is writing a long-in-the-works biography of John Phillips, entitled Wolf King.

=== Ghostwriting ===
In 2013, Campion worked uncredited, for former porn star, actress, and Twitch streamer, Sasha Grey, as the ghostwriter of The Juliette Society, a satirical erotic novel about a fictional, deep state secret sex society, whose guiding philosophy is inspired by the titular character of the Marquis de Sade novel, Juliette. The book took its cue from classic erotic novels 120 Days of Sodom, Thérèse the Philosopher, and Voltaire's Candide, tracing the sexual awakening of an innocent, a young film student, Catherine (loosely modeled on Grey, a film aficionado herself), whose unconscious desires are awakened after watching the 1967 Luis Buñuel film, Belle De Jour, starring Catherine Deneuve. As Catherine explores a disturbing sexual underworld populated by bizarre characters, she is unwittingly drawn closer and closer to the titular secret society.

Arriving at the height of Fifty Shades of Grey mania, The Juliette Society was published in 24 countries and 20 languages and optioned for a film adaptation by Fox, for writer Scott Z. Burns (The Bourne Supremacy, Contagion, The Report). Following the publication of the book, Campion created story outlines for and titled (but did not write) two further books in what would become The Juliette Society trilogy, The Janus Chamber and The Mismade Girl.

He co-wrote Some New Kind of Kick, a memoir for guitarist and musician Kid Congo Powers (Nick Cave and the Bad Seeds, The Cramps, The Gun Club). The book was published in 2021 by Hachette in the US and Omnibus Press in the UK, and longlisted for the 2023 Penderyn Music Prize.

=== Editor ===
In the summer of 2020, when Black Lives Matter protests raged across the US following the murder of George Floyd, Campion began working on The War Is Here: Newark 1967, a monograph of images shot by Life magazine photographer Bud Lee, struck how the photographs resonated with events taking place over half a century later decided they needed to be published. Campion rediscovered Lee's work in 2018 while researching another project. While on assignment in Newark for Life, Lee photographed the shooting death of a 24-year-old man named Billy Furr, which ran in the magazine. Lee's photograph of a 12-year-old boy, Joey Bass Jr., lying wounded and bleeding in the street by the police gunfire, the same bullets that killed Furr, was used on the cover of the July 28, 1967 issue of Life. The book, edited, designed and written by Campion, was published in May 2023 by ZE Books, a vanity publisher founded by Michael Zilkha, formerly of ZE Records. The foreword was written by 40th Mayor of Newark, the Honorable Ras J. Baraka, son of poet, playwright, and political activist, Amiri Baraka.

=== Producer ===
Campion founded the boutique music reissue label, Saint Cecilia Knows. Between 2011 and 2015, the label put out three highly-acclaimed releases, reissuing albums by singer-songwriters Mickey Newbury and Scott Fagan, and music by lost proto-punk and no wave band, Jack Ruby.

The first release on Saint Cecilia Knows was An American Trilogy, a 4-CD box set of albums by Mickey Newbury released in 2011. The box set collects the albums Looks Like Rain (Mercury, 1969), Frisco Mabel Joy (Elektra, 1971) and Heaven Help the Child (Elektra, 1973), alongside an additional album of rarities and unreleased material by Newbury, entitled Better Days. The box set was sub-licensed for US release to Drag City, who produced vinyl editions of each album. Newbury's albums had never been reissued prior to the Saint Cecilia Knows release. The masters, believed lost and destroyed in a fire, were located in the Rhino tape archive having been misfiled under the name 'Newberry'.

Due to the lack of a 2-track master of Looks Like Rain, the first album in the series, the original mix (with songs interspersed by sound effects) was painstakingly recreated by Grammy-winning engineer and producer Steve Rosenthal from the original multitrack tapes, at his NYC studio The Magic Shop. All four records were mastered by Grammy-nominated engineer, Jessica Thompson. A limited edition box set of the album, art directed by Grammy Award-winning designer Susan Archie, was released with extensive liner notes written by Campion, on Newbury's songwriting and the recording of the albums, alongside a text by Will Oldham and a vintage interview of Newbury by former Rolling Stone editor, Ben Fong Torres.

Hit and Run, a 2-disc anthology of music recorded between 1973 and 1977 by long disbanded NYC proto-punk group Jack Ruby, was released on Saint Cecilia Knows in 2014. The set included specially-commissioned artwork by Japanese painter Ken Hamaguchi, and liner notes by Jon Savage and Thurston Moore. Following the release, Jack Ruby's music was picked up for use in the Martin Scorsese-produced HBO series, Vinyl. Nasty Bits, the fictional punk group in the show, perform the Jack Ruby songs "Hit & Run", "Bored Stiff" and "Bad Teeth", along with a cover of "Beggars Parade" (originalist released by Frankie Valli and the Four Seasons), which were rerecorded for the show by a band helmed by Sonic Youth guitarist Lee Ranaldo, with Yo La Tengo bassist James McNew, Sonic Youth drummer Steve Shelley, and Velvet Monkeys and B.A.L.L. frontman, Don Fleming.

In 2015, Saint Cecilia Knows reissued South Atlantic Blues, the obscure debut album by songwriter Scott Fagan, father of The Magnetic Fields frontman and songwriter Stephen Merritt. Fagan, who hailed from the US Virgin Islands, was discovered, mentored, and managed by legendary Brill Building songwriter, Doc Pomus, soon after arriving in New York City, in 1964, with 10 cents in his pocket and Pomus' number written on a scrap of paper. In 1968, now-managed by Buffy Sainte Marie, Herb Gart, he recorded his debut album, a mystical stew of folk rock and calypso. The album was released on Atlantic Records subsidiary, Atco, but bombed. A few years later, artist Jasper Johns picked up a copy of the album in a cut-out bin and was so enamored of it that he created three limited edition lithographs, all entitled "Scott Fagan Record". An image of one of the lithographs was featured on a limited edition vinyl reissue of South Atlantic Blues, the first time Johns had authorized the use of his artwork on an album.

=== Film ===
Campion has a cameo appearance in the 2016 'documentary fiction' Where is Rocky II? by French artist and filmmaker, Pierre Bismuth (writer of Eternal Sunshine of the Spotless Mind), about the search for Rocky II, a mythical work by artist Ed Ruscha, a fiberglass rock he apparently placed in the Mojave Desert near Joshua Tree in 1980.

In 2018, he started work on his debut film as writer and director, Markland Mountain, a documentary about the cultural history of Joshua Tree. The film is currently in post-production.

== Bibliography ==
=== Books ===
==== As author ====
- Walking on the Moon: the Story of the Police and the Rise of New Wave Rock by Chris Campion (US: Wiley, 2009; UK: Aurum Press, 2010)
- The Juliette Society by Sasha Grey (US: Central Publishing, 2013; UK: reissue 2013) – ghostwriter (uncredited).
- Some New Kind of Kick by Kid Congo Powers with Chris Campion (US: Hachette, 2022; UK: Omnibus Press) – co-writer.
- The War is Here: Newark 1967 by Bud Lee, Chris Campion (ZE Books, 2023) – also editor and designer.

==== As contributor ====
- Suture: the Counter-culture Arts Journal (Creation Books, 1998)
- Dennis Hopper: Movie Top Ten (Creation Books, 1999)
- Harvey Keitel: Movie Top Ten (Creation Books, 1999)
- Apocalypse Culture II (Feral House, 2000)
- Star Culture: The Dazed and Confused Collected Interviews (Phaidon, 2000)
- Jim Jarmusch: Interviews (Conversations with Filmmakers Series) (University Press of Mississippi, 2001)

=== Journalism ===
==== Selected published articles ====
- Ramm Raider. Interview and profile of Rammellzee. (Dazed & Confused, 2000).
- You Shit-eating Swine! Interview and profile of Hunter S. Thompson. (Dazed & Confused, 2002).
- Delta Witch Trials. Reportage article about the West Memphis 3. (Telegraph Magazine, July 2005).
- J-Pop's Dream Factory. Reportage article about J-Pop boy and girl groups. (Observer Music Monthly, 2005).
- In the Face of Death. Reportage article about Mayhem and the Norwegian Black Metal scene. (Observer Music Monthly, February 2005).
- King of the Wild Frontier. Profile of John Phillips of The Mamas & the Papas. (Observer Music Monthly, November 2009)
- Space Cowboy. Feature article on Saturation 70, the lost Gram Parsons sci-fi movie. (Mojo, February 2013)
- Saturation 70: the Gram Parsons UFO film that never flew. Article on an exhibition about Saturation 70. (The Guardian, September 2014)
- Lithofayne Pridgon: Jimi Hendrix's original ‘Foxy Lady. Interview and profile of Lithofayne Pridgon. (Observer Magazine, April 2015)
- Punk prosthetics: the mesmerising art of Mari Katayama. Interview and profile of Japanese artist Mari Katayama. (The Guardian, March 2017)
