= Mickey Newbury Collection =

The Mickey Newbury Collection

Box set by Mickey Newbury
- Released: 1998
- Recorded: 1969–1981
- Genres: Country; Folk; Rock
- Label: Mountain Retreat

Mickey Newbury chronology
Live in England (1998)	The Mickey Newbury Collection (1998)	It Might as Well Be the Moon (1999)

Professional ratings
Review scores
Source	Rating
Allmusic	4.5/5 stars
No Depression	(Favorable)

The Mickey Newbury Collection collects the ten albums Mickey Newbury released on three labels between 1969 and 1981 on an eight disc set. The set was released and is available through Mountain Retreat, a label run by Newbury and later Newbury's family. While Newbury had an impressive reputation as an artist and songwriter, at the time of the set's release in 1998, these recordings had been out of print for years. The original master tapes were lost by the labels, and so the recordings on the collection are digital transfers from virgin vinyl copies. The packaging replicates the original album art.

The collection includes the albums Looks Like Rain (1969), Frisco Mabel Joy (1971), Heaven Help The Child (1973), Live At Montezuma Hall (1973), I Came to Hear the Music (1974), and Lovers (1975) on individual discs, as well as Rusty Tracks (1977), and His Eye Is on the Sparrow (1978), The Sailor (1979) and After All These Years (1981) on two combined discs. Newbury created a remarkable body of work, and while he is often classified as a country artist, the breadth of his artistic reach includes blues, soul, folk, rock, and traditional styles. Newbury frequently includes suites such as "Wrote A Song A Song/Angeline," "The Sailor/Song of Sorrow/Let's Say Goodbye One More Time," and the epic, and oft-covered "An American Trilogy" which combines "Dixie," "Battle Hymn of the Republic," and "All My Trials," and includes production effects such as rain, wind chimes, and strings. Other highlights of the set include "San Francisco Mabel Joy," "Apples Dipped in Candy," "Wish I Was," "Cortelia Clark," "The Future's Not What It Used To Be," "Let's Have A Party," "She Even Woke Me Up to Say Goodbye," "Sweet Memories."

== Track listing ==
=== Disc One: Looks Like Rain ===
1. "Wrote A Song A Song/Angeline" (Mickey Newbury)
2. "She Even Woke Me Up To Say Goodbye" (Mickey Newbury/Doug Gilmore)
3. "I Don't Think About Her No More" (Mickey Newbury)
4. "T. Total Tommy" (Mickey Newbury)
5. "The 33rd of August" (Mickey Newbury)
6. "When The Baby In My Lady Gets The Blues" (Mickey Newbury)
7. "San Francisco Mabel Joy" (Mickey Newbury)
8. "Looks Like Baby's Gone" (Mickey Newbury)

=== Disc Two: Frisco Mabel Joy ===
1. "An American Trilogy" (Mickey Newbury/Traditional)
2. "How Many Times (Must The Piper Be Paid For His Song)" (Mickey Newbury)
3. "Interlude" (Mickey Newbury)
4. "The Future's Not What It Used To Be" (Mickey Newbury)
5. "Mobile Blue" (Mickey Newbury)
6. "Frisco Depot" (Mickey Newbury)
7. "You're Not My Same Sweet Baby" (Mickey Newbury)
8. "Interlude" (Mickey Newbury)
9. "Remember The Good" (Mickey Newbury)
10. "Swiss Cottage Place" (Mickey Newbury)
11. "How I Love Them Old Songs" (Mickey Newbury)

=== Disc Three: Heaven Help The Child ===
1. "Heaven Help The Child" (Mickey Newbury)
2. "Good Morning Dear" (Mickey Newbury)
3. "Sunshine" (Mickey Newbury)
4. "Sweet Memories" (Mickey Newbury)
5. "Why You Been Gone So Long" (Mickey Newbury)
6. "Cortelia Clark" (Mickey Newbury)
7. "Song For Susan" (Mickey Newbury)
8. "San Francisco Mabel Joy" (Mickey Newbury)

=== Disc Four: Live At Montezuma Hall ===
1. "How I Love Them Old Songs" (Mickey Newbury)
2. "Heaven Help The Child" (Mickey Newbury)
3. "Earthquake" (Mickey Newbury)
4. "Cortelia Clark" (Mickey Newbury)
5. "I Came To Hear The Music" (Mickey Newbury)
6. "San Francisco Mabel Joy" (Mickey Newbury)
7. "Bugger Red Blues" (Mickey Newbury)
8. "How Many Times (Must The Piper Be Paid For His Song)" (Mickey Newbury)
9. "An American Trilogy" (Mickey Newbury/Traditional)
10. "Please Send Me Someone To Love" (Percy Mayfield)
11. "She Even Woke Me Up To Say Goodbye" (Mickey Newbury/Doug Gilmore)

=== Disc Five: I Came to Hear the Music ===
1. "I Came To Hear The Music" (Mickey Newbury)
2. "Breeze Lullaby" (Mickey Newbury)
3. "You Only Live Once (In A While)" (Mickey Newbury)
4. "Yesterday's Gone" (Mickey Newbury)
5. "If You See Her" (Mickey Newbury)
6. "Dizzy Lizzy" (Mickey Newbury)
7. "If I Could Be" (Mickey Newbury)
8. "Organized Noise" (Mickey Newbury)
9. "Love, Look At Us Now" (Mickey Newbury)
10. "Baby's Not Home" (Mickey Newbury)
11. "1 X 1 Ain't 2" (Mickey Newbury)

=== Disc Six: Lovers ===
1. "Apples Dipped In Candy" (Mickey Newbury)
2. "Lovers" (Mickey Newbury)
3. "Sail Away" (Mickey Newbury)
4. "When Do We Stop Starting Over" (Mickey Newbury)
5. "Lead On" (Mickey Newbury)
6. "How's The Weather" (Mickey Newbury)
7. "If You Ever Get To Houston (Look Me Down)" (Mickey Newbury)
8. "You Always Got The Blues" (Mickey Newbury)
9. "Let Me Sleep" (Mickey Newbury)
10. "Good Night" (Mickey Newbury)

=== Disc Seven: Rusty Tracks/His Eye Is on the Sparrow ===
1. "Leavin' Kentucky" (Mickey Newbury)
2. "Makes Me Wonder If I Ever Said Goodbye" (Mickey Newbury)
3. "Bless Us All" (Mickey Newbury)
4. "Hand Me Another Of Those" (Mickey Newbury/Lee Fry)
5. "People Are Talking" (Mickey Newbury)
6. "Tell Him Boys" (Mickey Newbury)
7. "Shenandoah" (Traditional)
8. "That Lucky Old Sun" (Just Rolls Around Heaven All Day) (Haven Gillespie/Harry Beasley Smith)
9. "Danny Boy" (Frederick Weatherly)
10. "In The Pines" (Traditional)
11. "Juble Lee's Revival" (Mickey Newbury)
12. "Westphalia Texas Waltz" (Mickey Newbury)
13. "Wish I Was" (Mickey Newbury)
14. "His Eye Is On The Sparrow" (Public Domain)
15. "The Dragon And The Mouse" (Mickey Newbury)
16. "Gone To Alabama" (Mickey Newbury)
17. "It Don't Matter Anymore" (Mickey Newbury)
18. "I Don't Know What They Wanted Me To Say" (Mickey Newbury)
19. "Saint Cecilia" (Mickey Newbury)
20. "Juble Lee's Revival Shout" (Mickey Newbury)

=== Disc Eight: The Sailor/After All These Years ===
1. "Blue Sky Shinin'" (Mickey Newbury)
2. "Let's Have A Party" (Mickey Newbury)
3. "There's A Part Of Her Still Holding On Somehow" (Mickey Newbury)
4. "A Weed Is A Weed" (Mickey Newbury)
5. "Let It Go" (Mickey Newbury)
6. "Looking For The Sunshine" (Mickey Newbury)
7. "Darlin' Take Care Of Yourself" (Mickey Newbury)
8. "Long Gone" (Mickey Newbury)
9. "The Night You Wrote That Song" (Mickey Newbury)
10. "The Sailor" (Mickey Newbury)
11. "Song Of Sorrow" (Mickey Newbury)
12. "Let's Say Goodbye One More Time" (Mickey Newbury)
13. "That Was The Way It Was Then" (Mickey Newbury)
14. "Country Boy Saturday Night" (Mickey Newbury)
15. "Truly Blue" (Mickey Newbury)
16. "Just As Long As That Someone Is You" (Mickey Newbury)
17. "Over The Mountain" (Mickey Newbury/Joe Henry)
18. "Catchers In The Rye" (Mickey Newbury)
19. "I Still Love You (After All These Years)" (Mickey Newbury)
