= In a New Age =

Studio album by Mickey Newbury
- Released: 1988
- Recorded: 1988
- Studio: Master's Touch Studio, Nashville
- Genre: Country
- Label: Airborne
- Producer: Greg Humphrey

Mickey Newbury chronology
Sweet Memories (1985)	In a New Age (1988)	The Best of Mickey Newbury (1991)

Professional ratings
Review scores
Source	Rating
Allmusic	2/5 stars

In a New Age is a 1988 album by the singer-songwriter Mickey Newbury. It contains new versions of eight classic Newbury songs, with a full version of "All My Trials" which is part of Newbury's "An American Trilogy" (which is also included on the album.)

== Background ==
In 1988, Airborne Records planned a release in which Newbury's demos would be treated with synthesizers and other then-contemporary production effects. These demos stemmed from sessions with the producer Larry Butler in Nashville in March 1983 and featured new age synthesizer sounds, which Newbury came to loathe. "I was so drunk then," he later explained. "I hate those cuts and never want to hear 'em again." Newbury also claimed to have thrown a cassette of the recording on the ground and stomped on it. He was aghast when he heard that Airborne was planning to release the recordings, and had even printed up the album art, but, after learning that no CDs or cassettes had yet been made, he instead re-recorded the songs that Airborne planned to use, and the album was released with these new recordings, effectively Newbury's first recordings in years.

Newbury recorded the album with accompaniment from the violinist Marie Rhines. The set includes the Newbury classics "An American Trilogy", "San Francisco Mabel Joy", "Lovers" and "Cortelia Clark". "Poison Red Berries" was originally released as "I Don't Think About Her No More" on Looks Like Rain while "Willow Tree" was originally titled "Wish I Was" and released on His Eye Is on the Sparrow. Rhines later recalled, "When I arrived at the studio at 11AM, I remember it was quiet, no one around, except Mickey – who had set up two chairs in this big empty studio... I sat down, and then we began to play and never stopped until side one was done... We returned after a brief lunch, sat down and went through the exact order of side two never stopping the tape until we had finished the final song. Done. Mickey loved the results.

After recording had finished, Newbury convinced Butler and Airborne to release his new version of the album instead, which they eventually agreed to do. Airborne did release the recordings that Newbury rejected, also titled In a New Age, but had a Canadian distribution through CBS Music Products - catalogue No. ABK-61000. The title on the actual compact disc is printed A Legend In A New Age – one that Newbury initially rejected.

In 1999, In a New Age was revised by Newbury's label Mountain Retreat, bass, percussion, guitar and sound effects were added. It was paired with a 1988 concert with violin accompaniment by Rhines as part of a 2-CD set, It Might As Well Be the Moon.

== Track listing ==
All songs composed by Mickey Newbury unless otherwise indicated:

1. "All My Trials" (traditional)
2. "Cortelia Clark"
3. "Willow Tree"
4. "The Sailor"
5. "Frisco Depot"
6. "Poison Red Berries"
7. "Lovers"
8. "San Francisco Mabel Joy"
9. "An American Trilogy" (traditional; arranged by Mickey Newbury)
