= Rusty Tracks =

Studio album by Mickey Newbury
- Released: 1977
- Recorded: 1977
- Genre: Country
- Length: 31:02
- Label: Hickory
- Producer: Bobby Bare, Ronnie Gant

Mickey Newbury chronology
| Lovers (1975) | Rusty Tracks (1977) | His Eye Is on the Sparrow (1978) |

Professional ratings
Review scores
| Source | Rating |
|---|---|
| Allmusic | 4/5 stars |

Rusty Tracks is a 1977 album by singer-songwriter Mickey Newbury, released by Hickory Records. The record is noted for Newbury's interpretations of four traditional songs, "Shenandoah", "That Lucky Old Sun", "Danny Boy", and "In The Pines".

Rusty Tracks was collected for CD reissue on the eight-disc Mickey Newbury Collection from Mountain Retreat, Newbury's own label in the mid-1990s, along with nine other Newbury albums from 1969–1981.

== Background ==
By 1976, after a string of commercially unsuccessful albums, Newbury and Elektra Records parted ways. As Thom Jurek notes in his AllMusic review of Newbury's 1975 LP Lovers, "As solid as Lovers is, it still failed to ignite on the chart level. It was greeted with indifference by radio and, hence, Elektra - which had believed and invested in Newbury's creative vision and proven credibility as a songwriter - let him go." Newbury biographer Joe Ziemer sums up the singer's dilemma in his book Crystal and Stone: "Though diversity derives from aptitude and ability, diversity was Newbury's problem with radio stations. One dominant characteristic of his music is eclecticism, and that's what made his albums unattractive to strict radio formats." Newbury had made several high profile appearances to promote Lovers, including on the Tonight Show, but began to sour on touring, telling Rich Wiseman of Rolling Stone in 1975, "I'll probably quit performing and just record on an album-to-album basis. I'm hating what I'm doing now." In 1977 he elaborated to the Omaha Review, "I worked a few concerts, mostly college concerts, just to prove to Elektra that it wouldn't help. They kept blaming the lack of sales on me."

Ironically, Newbury's profile could not have been higher on the radio in 1977, albeit in a reverential way; in April outlaw country superstar Waylon Jennings released the #1 country smash "Luckenbach, Texas (Back to the Basics of Love)", which contains the lines "Between Hank Williams' pain songs, Newbury's train songs..." The song became an instant classic but most of the listeners who sang along with the tune likely had no idea who Newbury was. Although cited by Jennings, Kris Kristofferson, David Allan Coe, and several other country stars as a primary influence on their songwriting and albums, Newbury had little interest in cashing in on the outlaw country movement; according to Ziemer, Newbury was pressured by his record company to record an album called Newbury's Train Songs but Newbury turned them down: "They couldn't understand why I refused to do it. But I figured what little audience I did have would have immediately seen it for what it was: Jumping on the bandwagon when I didn't fit the mold."

== Recording and composition ==
Newbury had started recording songs for what would become Rusty Tracks with Bobby Bare producing while he was still with Elektra but, after signing with ABC Hickory Records, he took those tracks with him (ABC also secured the rights to all of Newbury's Elektra masters). He continued working on the album with producer Ronnie Gant and a legion of Nashville's best musicians. Rusty Tracks was far more rooted in country music than Newbury's previous albums I Came to Hear the Music and Lovers had been, and he continued to explore the darker side of the human experience in his songs, as is evident in the LP's opening track "Leaving Kentucky".

Newbury, who battled depression in his life, later reflected, "How many people have listened to my songs and thought, 'He must have a bottle of whiskey in one hand and a pistol in the other.' Well, I don't. I write my sadness." "Makes Me Wonder If I Ever Said Goodbye" and "Hand Me Another One of Those" both address the classic country theme of getting plastered and drowning sorrows ("Pour some whiskey on my flame and burn another memory") while "People Are Talking" appears to reflect Newbury's growing disenchantment with the music business and play up to his reputation as a hermit.

Rather than throw his lot in with the outlaw movement, Rusty Tracks saw Newbury radically rework several Americana classics like "In the Pines" and "Shenandoah" with such emotive phrasing and powerful singing that he "made the songs his own." Reminiscent of his early masterpiece "An American Trilogy", Newbury seamlessly weaves together a quartet of songs that brought the LP to a dazzling conclusion. In its review of the album, AllMusic states:

He doesn't merely sing these songs - he is them, a part and parcel of the fabric of the notes themselves and what they represent. Just when Americans were trying to forget who they were by embracing European disco and punk rock as well as dumbed-down versions of both country and jazz, Newbury reveals - much to his own commercial detriment - who and what we are as a nation.

Unlike Newbury's earlier Elektra albums, which featured a small group of top Nashville session players, Rusty Tracks includes contributions from a host of musicians and singers, including keyboardist Bobby Emmons (who co-wrote "Luckenback, Texas"), steel guitarist Buddy Emmons, guitarist Reggie Young, and budding country stars Janie Fricke and Larry Gatlin.

== Reception ==
Like most of the albums Newbury released, Rusty Tracks did not chart. "Hand Me Another One of Those" was released as a single and peaked at #94 on the Billboard country chart. Biographer Joe Ziemer writes, "The songs carry on with perceptive lyrics, masterly delivered in memorable melodies." AllMusic: "This concentration on one music and its classic themes and rougher-edged production proved to be as great as anything he had done since his early records."

== Track listing ==
All tracks composed by Mickey Newbury; except where indicated

1. "Leavin' Kentucky" - 3:50
2. "Makes Me Wonder If I Ever Said Goodbye" - 2:43
3. "Bless Us All" - 2:27
4. "Hand Me Another Of Those" (Mickey Newbury, Lee Fry) - 1:55
5. "People Are Talking" - 2:54
6. "Tell Him Boys" - 2:27
7. "Shenandoah" (Traditional) - 3:36
8. "That Lucky Old Sun (Just Rolls Around Heaven All Day)" (Haven Gillespie, Harry Beasley Smith) - 2:26
9. "Danny Boy" (Frederic Weatherly) - 4:39
10. "In the Pines" (Traditional) - 4:05

== Personnel ==
- Mickey Newbury - guitar, vocals
- Billy Sanford, Bobby Thompson, David Kirby, Johnny Christopher, Phil Baugh, Reggie Young - guitar
- Buddy Emmons, Lloyd Green - steel guitar
- Henry Strzelecki, Joe Allen, Norbert Putnam - bass
- Alan Moore, Bobby Emmons, Bobby Wood, Ron Oates - keyboards
- Buddy Spicher - fiddle
- Farrell Morris, Hayward Bishop, Jimmy Isbell, Larrie Londin - drums
- Terry McMillan - harmonica
- Cindy Reynolds - harp
- Everhard Ramm - French horn
- Alan Moore, Bergen White, Bobby Hardin, Buzz Cason, Don Gant, Duane West, Janie Fricke, Larry Gatlin, Lea Jane Berinati, Rita Figlio, Suzie Calloway, Tom Brannon, Yvonne Hodges - backing vocals
- Ann Migliore, Christian Teal, David Vanderkooi, Gary Vanosdale, John Catchings, Kathryn Plummer, Marilyn Kay Smith, Pam Sixfin, Steven Smith, Wilfred Lehmen - strings
- Alan Moore - arrangements, conductor
