= After All These Years =

After All These Years may refer to:

== Music ==
- After All These Years (Brian & Jenn Johnson album) or the title song, 2017
- After All These Years (Instrumental), a compilation album from Bethel Music, including a remix of the Brian & Jenn Johnson song, 2017
- After All These Years (Mickey Newbury album), 1981
- "After All These Years" (Journey song), 2008
- "After All These Years", a song by Ringo Starr from Time Takes Time, 1992
- "After All These Years", a song by Silverchair from Diorama, 2002

== Other media ==
- "After All These Years" (The Legend of Korra), a television episode
- After All These Years, a 1956 TV movie episode in Robert Montgomery Presents
- After All These Years, a 1993 novel by Susan Isaacs
- After All These Years, a 2013 TV movie based on the novel, starring Wendie Malick
