= Sings His Own =

Compilation album by Mickey Newbury
- Released: 1972
- Recorded: 1968
- Genre: Country
- Label: RCA
- Producer: Felton Jarvis

Mickey Newbury chronology
| Frisco Mabel Joy (1971) | Sings His Own (1972) | Heaven Help the Child (1973) |

Professional ratings
Review scores
| Source | Rating |
|---|---|
| Allmusic | 2.5/5 stars |

Sings His Own is the 1972 compilation album by singer-songwriter Mickey Newbury, a revised edition of his debut Harlequin Melodies, released by RCA Records in 1972, after the critical notice of Newbury's highly acclaimed Looks Like Rain and Frisco Mabel Joy. Newbury's RCA debut heavily featured songs that had been made into hits by other artists, and there is not much difference between that set and this one. Newbury largely disowned his RCA recordings, considering 1969's Looks Like Rain his true debut, and this album bears little stylistic similarity to anything else in his catalog.

== Recordings ==
Sings His Own substitutes Harlequin Melodies tracks "Here Comes The Rain, Baby", "How Many Times (Must The Piper Be Paid For His Song", "Mister Can't You See", and "Harlequin Melodies", for "The Queen", "Sunshine", and "Got Down On Saturday". "The Queen" and "Mister Can't You See" are noteworthy for being co-written by Newbury's friend and fellow Texan Townes Van Zandt. As with the preceding album, many of these songs would be heavily covered by other artists, and Newbury himself would reinterpret "Sweet Memories", "Sunshine", and "Good Morning, Dear" on his 1973 album Heaven Help the Child. There is some debate about whether the versions of the seven duplicated songs from Harlequin Melodies are different recordings from the original album. However, most CD versions add the new Sings His Own songs as bonus tracks to the complete Harlequin Melodies album. On the album cover, Newbury is wearing a Stetson that had been a gift from producer Felton Jarvis, who had originally received it from Elvis Presley.

== Reception ==
Thom Jurek of AllMusic contends Sings His Own is "interesting in an historical manner. As a way of hearing Newbury's unique and beautiful singing voice, it's worthwhile, but as a testament to Newbury's vision, it doesn't fit the bill at all." Newbury biographer Joe Ziemer disparaged the album as "another embarrassment" from RCA.

== Track listing ==
All tracks composed by Mickey Newbury; except where indicated

1. "Sweet Memories" - 3:19
2. "Good Morning, Dear" - 2:52
3. "Just Dropped In" - 2:52
4. "Weeping Annaleah" - 2:34
5. "Time is a Thief" - 3:02
6. "Funny, Familiar, Forgotten Feelings" - 2:58
7. "Sunshine" - 2:43
8. "Got Down on Saturday" - 2:48
9. "Are My Thoughts With You" - 3:06
10. "The Queen" (Mickey Newbury, Townes Van Zandt) - 3:08

== Personnel ==
- Al Pachucki - engineer
- Cam Mullins (tracks: 6, 7), Tupper Saussy (tracks: 1, 4, 9) - arranger and conductor
- Jimmy Moore - cover photography
