= Harlequin Melodies =

Studio album by Mickey Newbury
- Released: 1968
- Recorded: 1968
- Studios: RCA Studio A (Nashville, Tennessee)
- Genres: Progressive country; contemporary folk; psychedelic folk
- Label: RCA
- Producer: Felton Jarvis

Mickey Newbury chronology
Harlequin Melodies (1968)	Looks Like Rain (1969)

Professional ratings
Review scores
Source	Rating
Allmusic	4/5 stars

Harlequin Melodies is the 1968 debut album by singer-songwriter Mickey Newbury. Newbury was already a successful songwriter in Nashville, signed by Acuff-Rose Publishing. At one point he had four #1 hits on different charts for Eddy Arnold, Solomon Burke, The First Edition, and Andy Williams, and he had written hits for several others. Produced by Elvis Presley producer Felton Jarvis, Harlequin Melodies concentrates on Newbury's versions of his hit songs; nearly every song on the album has been covered by other artists.

Sonically, the album is drastically different from anything else Newbury would record. The artist largely disowned the album, considering its successor Looks Like Rain his true debut. In contrast to the subtle expressiveness of Newbury's prime work, Harlequin Melodies is overproduced and packed with often distracting instrumental touches, shifting tempos, and strange production effects. As a result of his dissatisfaction with the album and recording sessions, Newbury ended his RCA contract. Some of the songs on Harlequin Melodies would be re-recorded by Newbury for later albums, with very marked differences. "How Many Times (Must the Piper Be Paid for His Song)" was a highlight of Frisco Mabel Joy, "Good Morning, Dear" and "Sweet Memories" were on Heaven Help the Child, "Here Comes the Rain Baby" on A Long Road Home, the last album Newbury released during his lifetime.

Seven of the songs on Harlequin Melodies were repackaged for Sings His Own where they would be joined by another oft-covered Newbury song "Sunshine" and two of his RCA singles "The Queen" and "Got Down on Saturday." Most CD versions add these songs as bonus tracks to the complete Harlequin Melodies album.

== Track listing ==
All tracks composed by Mickey Newbury; except where indicated

1. "Sweet Memories" – 3:19
2. "Here Comes the Rain, Baby" – 2:27
3. "Mister Can't You See" (Mickey Newbury, Townes Van Zandt) – 5:45
4. "How Many Times (Must the Piper Be Paid for His Song)" – 3:13
5. "Are My Thoughts with You" – 3:06
6. "Harlequin Melodies" – 2:53
7. "Funny, Familiar, Forgotten Feelings" – 2:58
8. "Time Is a Thief" – 3:02
9. "Good Morning, Dear" – 2:52
10. "Weeping Annaleah" – 2:34
11. "Just Dropped In (To See What Condition My Condition Was In)" – 2:52

=== Sings His Own bonus tracks ===
Most CD issues of Harlequin Melodies combine the intact album running order with the three tracks substituted on 1968's Sings His Own.

1. "The Queen" (Mickey Newbury, Townes Van Zandt) – 3:08
2. "Sunshine" – 2:43
3. "Got Down on Saturday" – 2:48

=== Raven Records edition bonus tracks ===
A 2003 Raven Records edition combined Harlequin Melodies, the three tracks from Sings His Own with a B-side and seven tracks from his Elektra and Mercury recordings selected from the 1985 compilation Sweet Memories.

1. "Organised Noise" – 3:05
2. "Remember the Good" – 2:58
3. "The Future's Not What It Used to Be" – 4:10
4. "How I Love Them Old Songs" – 3:44
5. "If You Ever Get to Houston" – 3:41
6. "She Even Woke Me Up to Say Goodbye" (Mickey Newbury, Doug Gilmore) – 3:57
7. "Dizzy Lizzy" – 3:58
8. "An American Trilogy" (Mickey Newbury/Traditional) – 4:48

== Personnel ==
- Al Pachucki – engineer
- Cam Mullins (tracks: 3, 8), Tupper Saussy (tracks: 1, 2, 6, 8, 9) – arrangements

== Selected cover recordings ==
- "Funny, Familiar, Forgotten Feelings" was Newbury's first songwriting hit, released by Don Gibson in 1966. The song was also a hit for Tom Jones in 1967. The song has also been recorded by Engelbert Humperdinck, Floyd Cramer, Vikki Carr, The New Christy Minstrels, and Dottie West among others.
- "Just Dropped In (To See What Condition My Condition Was In)" was originally cut by Jerry Lee Lewis his version initially released on his 1967 Soul My Way LP; it then became a huge psychedelic hit for The First Edition. While the version on Harlequin Melodies is very much psychedelia colored, Newbury's later versions are slower and far more menacing. Especially notable is his 1991 medley of "Just Dropped In" and his 1978 song "Wish I Was." Other cover versions include recordings by Nick Cave, Children of Bodom, and Supergrass.
- "Mister Can't You See" became Buffy Sainte-Marie's only top 75 hit in 1972.
- The original album notes refer to "Sweet Memories" as a signature song. It has been recorded by over 70 different artists including Andy Williams who had the original hit, Brenda Lee, Ray Charles, The Everly Brothers, Brook Benton; recently by Willie Nelson, Merle Haggard, and Ray Price on the 2007 album Last of the Breed; and by The Time Jumpers for which they received a Grammy nomination in 2008. Newbury recorded a new version of the song on his 1973 album Heaven Help the Child.
- "Weeping Annaleah" was included on The Box Tops' album Cry Like a Baby; it was recorded as "Sleeping Annaleah" by Nick Cave on his 1986 album Kicking Against the Pricks.
- "Here Comes the Rain, Baby" was a country hit for Eddy Arnold prior to the album's release. It has also recorded by Roy Orbison, Sammi Smith, and Don Gibson.
- "Time Is a Thief" was recorded by Solomon Burke and B.B. King.
- "Good Morning Dear" has been recorded by Roy Orbison, Don Gibson, The Box Tops, Ray Charles, as well as Pat Boone, Tennessee Ernie Ford, and Frank Ifield. Like "Sweet Memories" it was rerecorded in a superior version on 1973's Heaven Help The Child.
- "Are My Thoughts with You" was recorded by Linda Ronstadt on her second solo album Silk Purse as well as Earl Scruggs and Etta James. It was initially a failed single for The First Edition in 1968.
