= After All These Years (Mickey Newbury album) =

Studio album by Mickey Newbury
- Released: 1981
- Recorded: 1981
- Genre: Country
- Length: 35:13
- Label: Mercury

Mickey Newbury chronology
The Sailor (1979)	After All These Years (1981)	Sweet Memories (1986)

Professional ratings
Review scores
Source	Rating
AllMusic	4/5 stars

After All These Years is the 1981 album by singer-songwriter Mickey Newbury. Considered the concluding album of his remarkable 1970s run, it was the last album he would record for seven years. The album is very different in tone from its predecessor and revives Newbury's talent for song suites with "The Sailor/Song of Sorrow/Let's Say Goodbye One More Time". Other highlights on the album include "That Was The Way It Was Then" and "Over the Mountain".

After All These Years was collected for CD issue on the eight-disc Mickey Newbury Collection from Mountain Retreat, Newbury's own label in the mid-1990s, along with nine other Newbury albums from 1969–1981.

== Recording and composition ==
After All These Years was recorded in producer's Norbert Putnam's 1875 mansion the Bennett House In Franklin, Tennessee. After the glossy production of Newbury's last album The Sailor, After All These Years was a return of sorts to the orchestrated melodies and haunting song suites of his earlier albums. "The Sailor", which had been left off its namesake album, features a harrowingly darker sound that hearkens back to Newbury's earlier work, "painted with broad strokes and with metaphorical allusions to heaven, hell, and earth." For the most part, the songs contained on the LP speak to a longing for the old days, but with more optimism than on Newbury's Frisco Mabel Joy album, which explored the same theme.

Newbury biographer Joe Ziemer contends "Let's Say Goodbye One More Time" and "That Was The Way It Was Then" are "sincere offerings of the heart of a card-carrying romantic."

== Reception ==
AllMusic gave After All These Years four out of five stars, with reviewer Thom Jurek stating: "Somehow from the vastness of the sea expressed in the suite's first song to the individual sitting alone in a room at night staring at a clock, we find the spectrum of human regret and grief. These songs -- most of them country songs although there is a strangely wonderful country-rock ballad called 'Truly Blue' -- reveal for the first time Newbury's sense that he may have wasted his career."

== Track listing ==
All tracks by Mickey Newbury except where noted

1. "The Sailor" – 5:21
2. "Song of Sorrow" – 3:22
3. "Let's Say Goodbye One More Time" – 3:35
4. "That Was the Way It Was Then" – 2:41
5. "Country Boy Saturday Night" – 3:27
6. "Truly Blue" – 3:41
7. "Just as Long as That Someone Is You" – 3:26
8. "Over the Mountain" (Newbury, Joe Henry) – 3:26
9. "Catchers in the Rye" – 2:52
10. "I Still Love You (After All These Years)" – 3:27

== Personnel ==
- Mickey Newbury – guitar, vocals
- Steve Brantley – vocals
- Bruce Dees – vocals
- Gene Eichelberger – engineer
- Steve Gibson – guitar
- Jon Goin – guitar
- David Hungate – bass
- Shane Keister – piano
- Sheldon Kurland – strings
- Dave Loggins – guitar, vocals
- Mike Manna – piano
- Terry McMillan – harmonica
- Weldon Myrick – steel guitar
- Bobby Ogdin – piano
- Norbert Putnam – guitar
- Cindy Reynolds – harp
- Buddy Spicher – fiddle
- James Stroud – drums
- Jack Williams – bass
