= Live at Montezuma Hall =

Live album by Mickey Newbury
- Released: August 1973
- Recorded: March 6, 1973
- Venue: Montezuma Hall, San Diego State University
- Genre: Country
- Length: 51:48
- Label: Elektra
- Producer: Ron Middag

Mickey Newbury chronology
Heaven Help the Child (1973)	Live at Montezuma Hall (1973)	I Came to Hear the Music (1974)

Professional ratings
Review scores
Source	Rating
Allmusic	4/5 stars

Live at Montezuma Hall is the first live album from singer-songwriter Mickey Newbury, recorded at Montezuma Hall at San Diego State University in 1973. Featuring Newbury performing solo with an acoustic guitar, the album is notable for touching renditions of many of Newbury's excellent songs and for his personable and humored performance. The set was not edited for the album.

Live at Montezuma Hall was collected for CD issue on the eight-disc Mickey Newbury Collection from Mountain Retreat, Newbury's own label in the mid-1990s, along with nine other Newbury albums from 1969–1981.

== Track listing ==
All tracks composed by Mickey Newbury; except where indicated

1. "How I Love Them Old Songs" – 2:11
2. "Heaven Help the Child" – 5:27
3. "Earthquake" – 4:11
4. "Cortelia Clark" – 5:47
5. "I Came to Hear the Music" – 5:07
6. "San Francisco Mabel Joy" – 5:52
7. "Bugger Red Blues (The Truck Song)" – 6:21
8. "How Many Times (Must the Piper Be Paid for His Song)" – 4:41
9. "An American Trilogy" (Mickey Newbury/Traditional) – 4:33
10. "Please Send Me Someone to Love" (Percy Mayfield) – 2:53
11. "She Even Woke Me Up to Say Goodbye" (Mickey Newbury, Doug Gilmore) – 4:45

== Personnel ==
- Mickey Newbury – guitar, vocals
