= The Sailor (Mickey Newbury album) =

Studio album by Mickey Newbury
- Released: 1979
- Recorded: 1979
- Genre: Country
- Length: 26:45
- Label: Elektra
- Producer: Ronnie Gant

Mickey Newbury chronology
His Eye Is on the Sparrow (1978)	The Sailor (1979)	After All These Years (1981)

Professional ratings
Review scores
Source	Rating
Allmusic	4.5/5 stars

The Sailor is the 1979 album by singer-songwriter Mickey Newbury. The album features a contemporary country production style.

The Sailor was collected for CD issue on the eight-disc Mickey Newbury Collection from Mountain Retreat, Newbury's own label in the mid-1990s, along with nine other Newbury albums from 1969 to 1981.

== Track listing ==
All tracks composed by Mickey Newbury

1. "Blue Sky Shinin'" - 2:54
2. "Let's Have a Party" - 3:17
3. "There's a Part of Her Still Holding On Somehow" - 2:53
4. "A Weed is a Weed" - 2:21
5. "Let It Go" - 2:48
6. "Looking for the Sunshine" - 3:15
7. "Darlin' Take Care of Yourself" - 3:02
8. "Long Gone" - 2:43
9. "The Night You Wrote That Song" - 3:37

== Personnel ==
- Mickey Newbury
- Barry "Byrd" Burton, Billy Sanford, Bobby Thompson, Don Roth, Rafe Van Hoy, Ray Edenton, John Goldthwaite – guitar
- Bob Moore – bass
- Buddy Spicher – fiddle
- Bobby Thompson – banjo
- Bobby Wood, John Moore – keyboards
- Jerry Carrigan – drums
- Mark Morris – percussion
- Jay Patten – saxophone
- Terry McMillan – harmonica
- Dennis Wilson, Diane Tidwell, Don Gant, Duane West, Ginger Holladay, John Moore, Lea Jane Berinati, Lisa Silver, Sheri Kramer, Thomas Brannon – backing vocals
- Carl Gorodetzky, Gary Vanosdale, George Binkley, John Catchings, Karl L. Polen Jr., Lennie Haight, Marvin Chantry, Pamela Vanosdale, Roy Christensen, Samuel Terranova, Sheldon Kurland, Steven Smith, Virginia Christensen, Wilfred Lehmen – strings
- Alan Moore – string arrangements

Technical

- Billy Sherrill, Lee Hazen, Lynn Peterzell – engineers
- Stuart Kusher – art direction
- Gene Brownell – photography
