= Lovers (Mickey Newbury album) =

Studio album by Mickey Newbury
- Released: 1975
- Recorded: 1975
- Studio: Young 'Un Sound (Murfreesboro, Tennessee)
- Genre: Country
- Label: Elektra
- Producer: Chip Young

Mickey Newbury chronology
I Came to Hear the Music (1974)	Lovers (1975)	Rusty Tracks (1977)

Professional ratings
Review scores
Source	Rating
Allmusic	3/5 stars
Uncut	5/5 stars

Lovers is the 1975 album by singer-songwriter Mickey Newbury. The album is noted for the inclusion of the epic trilogy "Apples Dipped In Candy" and the title track. It was his final release on Elektra Records. Chet Atkins played guitar on "Apples Dipped in Candy" and Bergen White arranged the strings on the album.

Lovers was collected for CD issue on the eight-disc Mickey Newbury Collection from Mountain Retreat, Newbury's own label in the mid-1990s, along with nine other Newbury albums from 1969-1981.

== Recording and composition ==
The period leading up to the recording of Lovers was not a good one for Newbury; his father had suffered a stroke, he had endured painful back surgery and had been hospitalized for pneumonia, and he was drinking heavily. AllMusic's Thom Jurek, who compares the album to Frank Sinatra's In the Wee Small Hours of the Morning, writes, "It's as if he's trying, through hard country, blues, gospel, R&B, lounge jazz, folk balladry, and even rock, to plead, beg, borrow, and scheme his way (apparently unsuccessfully) from under the bleak cloud that surrounds him." The album was produced by Chip Young, who had helmed Newbury's previous release I Came to Hear the Music, and was recorded at Youngun Sound Studios in Murfreesboro, Tennessee. Although primarily recognized as a country singer and songwriter, Newbury stocked Lovers with a plethora of musical styles, including blues ("You've Always Got the Blues"), gospel ("Lead On") and heartfelt balladry ("Lovers", "Goodnight"). The title track's evocative line, "To think they once tore down a wall for a door" was inspired, by songwriter Hank Cochran, who lived in an adjoining apartment to country singer Jeannie Seely and, having grown tired of going into the hall to knock on her door, cut a hole through the wall with a chainsaw. Newbury continued to mine new territory, especially for country music, by including a drum solo on "Let Me Sleep." In his Omaha Rainbow interview, Newbury stated that "Apples Dipped in Candy" "was a reminiscent kind of thing, going into those kind of songs you hear on the riverboats. Kind of a blues, New Orleans feel."

The album marked the end of Newbury's remarkable artistic run with Elektra. Peter Blackstock of No Depression proclaims the early seventies "was a fertile time for budding songwriters, and Newbury was the best."

== Reception ==
Lovers peaked at #172 on the Billboard albums chart.

== Track listing ==
All tracks composed by Mickey Newbury

1. "Apples Dipped in Candy"
2. "Lovers"
3. "Sail Away"
4. "When Do We Stop Starting Over"
5. "Lead On"
6. "How's the Weather"
7. "If You Ever Get to Houston (Look Me Down)"
8. "You Always Got the Blues"
9. "Let Me Sleep"
10. "Good Night"

== Personnel ==
- Mickey Newbury
- Chet Atkins - guitar on "Apples Dipped in Candy"
- Bergen White - string arrangements
- Charles William Bush, Ed Caraeff - photography
