= A Long Road Home =

Studio album by Mickey Newbury
- Released: 2002
- Recorded: 2002
- Genre: Country
- Length: 59:15
- Label: Mountain Retreat
- Producer: Paula Wolak

Mickey Newbury chronology
Stories from the Silver Moon Cafe (2000)	A Long Road Home (2002)	Winter Winds (2002)

Professional ratings
Review scores
Source	Rating
AllMusic	4.5/5 stars
No Depression	(Favorable)

A Long Road Home is the 2002 concept album by singer-songwriter Mickey Newbury, released on his Mountain Retreat label. The album was recorded while Newbury was receiving full-time oxygen treatments for emphysema. The concept album is notable for its two ten-minute plus songs "In '59" and "A Long Road Home," new songs "Where Are You Darlin' Tonight" and "So Sad," and a new version of "Here Comes The Rain, Baby" one of Newbury's early songwriting successes (a hit for Eddy Arnold) that he first recorded for his debut Harlequin Melodies. This was the last studio album Newbury released in his lifetime.

== Track listing ==
All songs written by Mickey Newbury.

1. "In '59" – 11:20
2. "I Don't Love You" – 2:05
3. "The Last Question (In The Dead Of The Night)" – 5:57
4. "Here Comes The Rain, Baby" – 3:03
5. "One More Song Of Hearts And Flowers" – 5:40
6. "A Moment With Heather" – 0:34
7. "Where Are You Darlin' Tonight" – 4:43
8. "So Sad" – 6:00
9. "Maybe" – 4:33
10. "A Long Road Home" – 10:01
11. "116 Westfield Street" – 5:22

== Personnel ==
- John Catchings – cello
- Vic Clay – acoustic guitar
- David Davidson – violin
- Bill Graham (strings musician) – fiddle, mandolin
- David Hoffner – synthesizer
- David Huntsinger – piano
- Liza Martin – background vocals
- Matt McKenzie – electric bass, upright bass
- Craig Nelson – upright bass
- Mickey Newbury – guitar, sound effects, vocals
- Jack Williams – guitar

=== Credits ===
- Martin Hall – engineer
- Owsley Manier – graphic design, design
- Michael McDonald – sound effects, mastering, post production
- Robert Rosemurgy – executive producer
- Paula Wolak – producer, engineer, mixing
