= I Came to Hear the Music =

Studio album by Mickey Newbury
- Released: 1974
- Recorded: 1974
- Studio: Young 'Un Sound (Murfreesboro, Tennessee)
- Genre: Country
- Length: 38:12
- Label: Elektra
- Producer: Chip Young

Mickey Newbury chronology
Live at Montezuma Hall (1973)	I Came to Hear the Music (1974)	Lovers (1975)

Professional ratings
Review scores
Source	Rating
Allmusic	4/5 stars

I Came to Hear the Music is the 1974 album by singer-songwriter Mickey Newbury, his fourth release on Elektra Records. The cover photography was by Norman Seeff.

I Came to Hear the Music was collected for CD issue on the eight-disc Mickey Newbury Collection from Mountain Retreat, Newbury's own label in the mid-1990s, along with nine other Newbury albums from 1969 to 1981.

== Track listing ==
All tracks composed by Mickey Newbury

1. "I Came To Hear The Music" - 4:15
2. "Breeze Lullaby" - 1:51
3. "You Only Live Once (In a While)" - 3:28
4. "Yesterday's Gone" - 3:30
5. "If You See Her" - 4:14
6. "Dizzy Lizzy" - 3:54
7. "If I Could Be" - 2:52
8. "Organized Noise" - 2:22
9. "Love, Look At Us Now" - 2:58
10. "Baby's Not Home" - 3:47
11. "1 X 1 Ain't 2" - 5:01

== Charts ==
Chart (1974)	Position
United States (Billboard 200)	209
Australia (Kent Music Report)	80

== Cover versions ==
- "Love Look At Us Now" was recorded by Edward Woodward, Johnny Rodriguez and Joe Simon.
- "1x1 Ain't 2" was covered by psychedelic garage band Neal Ford and the Fanatics.
- "If You See Her" appeared on albums by Waylon Jennings and Johnny Rodriguez.
- Don Gibson performed "Baby's Not Home."
- Glenn Barber scored a minor country hit with "You Only Live Once (In a While)."
- Will Oldham cut a version of "I Came to Hear the Music."
