= An American Trilogy (album) =

Box set by Mickey Newbury
- Released: 2011
- Recorded: 1969–73
- Studio: Cinderella Sound (Nashville, Tennessee)
- Genre: Country
- Label: Saint Cecilia Knows, Mountain Retreat
- Producer: Chris Campion (Box set)

Mickey Newbury chronology
Blue To This Day (2003)	An American Trilogy (2011)

Professional ratings
Review scores
Source	Rating
The Daily Telegraph	5/5 stars
Financial Times	4/5 stars
Pitchfork	(8.6/10)
Rolling Stone	4/5 stars
Slant Magazine	4.5/5 stars

An American Trilogy is a box set of three remastered albums by Mickey Newbury recorded between 1969 and 1973 at Cinderella Sound, in Madison, Tennessee, alongside an additional album of rare and unreleased recordings, entitled Better Days. It was released in 2011 on Saint Cecilia Knows, in association with the Newbury family and their label Mountain Retreat. The box includes the albums Looks Like Rain (originally released on Mercury records in 1969), Frisco Mabel Joy and Heaven Help The Child (released, respectively, in 1971 and 1973, both on Elektra records). All three albums have been remastered for the first time on CD from the original master tapes, long thought to have been destroyed in a fire.

== Albums included ==
1. Looks Like Rain (1969)
2. Frisco Mabel Joy (1971)
3. Heaven Help The Child (1973)
4. Better Days (2011)

=== Credits ===
- Jessica Thompson & Steve Rosenthal – mastering engineers
- Brian Thorn & Steve Rosenthal – remix engineers ("Looks Like Rain")
- Chris Campion – box set producer
- Chris Campion & Susan Archie – art direction and design
- Masumi Kobayashi – illustration
- Chris Campion, Ben Fong Torres, Kris Kristofferson, Kenny Rogers, Will Oldham – liner notes
