= Heaven Help the Child =

Studio album by Mickey Newbury
- Released: February 1973
- Recorded: 1973
- Studio: Cinderella Sound (Nashville, Tennessee)
- Genre: Country; progressive country
- Length: 37:28
- Label: Elektra
- Producer: Bob Beckham, Marlin Greene, Dennis Linde, Russ Miller

Mickey Newbury chronology
Sings His Own (1972)	Heaven Help the Child (1973)	Live at Montezuma Hall (1973)

Singles from Heaven Help the Child
- 1. "Heaven Help the Child" Released: February 1973; 2. "Sunshine" Released: June 1973

Professional ratings
Review scores
Source	Rating
AllMusic	5/5 stars
Rising Storm	favorable

Heaven Help the Child is a 1973 studio album by country singer-songwriter Mickey Newbury. The album was Newbury's third consecutive release recorded at Cinderella Studios. Noted for its dramatic remakes of four previous Newbury songs: "Sweet Memories" and "Good Morning Dear" from Harlequin Melodies, "Sunshine" from Sings His Own, and "San Francisco Mabel Joy" from Looks Like Rain, the album is considered equal among Newbury's acclaimed Looks Like Rain and Frisco Mabel Joy. Apart from its definitive versions of three of Newbury's early songwriting hits, the album is also acclaimed for its title track, with its multi-generational narrative, the haunting "Cortelia Clark", and the bluegrass classic "Why You Been Gone So Long". In his AllMusic review of the LP, Thom Jurek declares, "Newbury, for the third time in as many recording sessions, came up with a record that defies categorization. And for the third time in a row, he had done the impossible, created a masterpiece, a work of perfection."

Heaven Help the Child was collected for CD issue on the eight-disc Mickey Newbury Collection from Mountain Retreat, Newbury's own label in the mid-1990s, along with nine other Newbury albums from 1969–1981. In 2011, it was reissued again as part of the four-disc Mickey Newbury box set An American Trilogy on Saint Cecilia Knows, alongside two other albums recorded at Cinderella Sound, Looks Like Rain and Frisco Mabel Joy. This release marks the first time that Heaven Help the Child has been released on CD in remastered form, after the original master tapes (long thought to have been destroyed in a fire) were rediscovered in 2010.

== Track listing ==
All tracks written by Mickey Newbury.

1. "Heaven Help the Child" – 5:16
2. "Good Morning Dear" – 5:18
3. "Sunshine" – 4:34
4. "Sweet Memories" – 3:28
5. "Why You Been Gone So Long" – 3:27
6. "Cortelia Clark" – 5:12
7. "Song for Susan" – 4:30
8. "San Francisco Mabel Joy" – 5:43

== Personnel ==
- Guitar: Chet Atkins, Richard Bennett, Marlin Greene, Dennis Linde, Mickey Newbury, Charlie McCoy,
  Wayne Moss, Billy Sanford, Bobby Thompson, Steel Guitar: Weldon Myrick. Banjo: Bobby Thompson
- Bass: Tommy Cogbill, Emory Gordy Jr., Joe Osborn, Norbert Putnam
- Keyboards: David Briggs, Jimmie Haskell, Don Randi, Bobby Wood
- Drums: Kenny Malone, Dennis St. John
- Percussion: Farrell Morris
- Harmonica: Charlie McCoy
- Fiddle: Vassar Clements, Buddy Spicher
- Violin: James Getzoff, Jimmie Haskell
- Backing Vocals: Dennis Linde, Don Gant, Stan Farber, Tom Baylor
- Choir: The Nash Philharmonic Choir

== Selected cover recordings ==
- "San Francisco Mabel Joy" was heavily covered as both a folk and country song in the early 1970s. Joan Baez recorded the song for her 1971 hit double album Blessed Are... . Waylon Jennings included his version on his 1973 breakthrough Lonesome, On'ry and Mean. The song was also featured on Kenny Rogers' 1978 country smash The Gambler and John Denver's recording is on his 1981 album Some Days Are Diamonds. The Box Tops recorded a presumably early version under the title "Georgia Farm Boy," which was included as a bonus track on the 2000 reissue of The Letter/Neon Rainbow.
- "Sweet Memories" is one of Newbury's most prominent early songwriting successes, and became an early signature song. The first hit version was released by Andy Williams but the song has also been recorded by over 70 artists such as Brenda Lee, Ray Charles, The Everly Brothers, Brook Benton, with recent versions by Willie Nelson, Merle Haggard and Ray Price on the 2007 album Last of the Breed and by The Time Jumpers for which they received a Grammy nomination in 2008.
- "Good Morning Dear" has been recorded by Roy Orbison, Don Gibson, The Box Tops, Ray Charles, as well as Pat Boone, Tennessee Ernie Ford and Frank Ifield.
- "Sunshine" was originally released as a single by RCA in the late 1960s. Newbury's song has been recorded by Gene Vincent, Ray Stevens and Kenny Rogers and the First Edition
- "Cortelia Clark" has been recorded by Josh White Jr.
- "Why You Been Gone So Long" is Newbury's second most recorded composition. It has been recorded by Carl Perkins, Gene Parsons, Clarence White, Chris Hillman, Tony Rice, Johnny Darrell and David Allan Coe among others. The song has also been recorded by Jessie Colter (appearing on the 1976 RCA compilation Wanted! The Outlaws) and performed as a duet by Jerry Lee Lewis and Dolly Parton on Parton's television show.
- "Heaven Help the Child" was covered by Bill Callahan for a 2012 split single release from Saint Cecilia Knows and Drag City.
