= Frisco Mabel Joy =

'Frisco Mabel Joy

Studio album by Mickey Newbury
- Released: October 1971
- Recorded: 1971
- Studio: Cinderella Sound (Nashville, Tennessee)
- Genre: Country; progressive country
- Length: 44:47
- Label: Elektra
- Producer: Dennis Linde

Mickey Newbury chronology
Looks Like Rain (1969)	'Frisco Mabel Joy (1971)	Sings His Own (1972)

Singles from 'Frisco Mabel Joy
- 1. "An American Trilogy" Released: September 1971; 2. "Remember the Good" Released: June 1972

Professional ratings
Review scores
Source	Rating
AllMusic	5/5 stars
Christgau's Record Guide	C+
Uncut	5/5 stars

'Frisco Mabel Joy is a 1971 studio album by singer-songwriter Mickey Newbury. This was the second of three albums Newbury recorded at Cinderella Sound. The album includes the original version of "An American Trilogy", which Elvis Presley later performed in his Las Vegas shows with much success. "How Many Times (Must the Piper Be Paid for His Song)" is a dramatically re-imagined version of a song first released on Harlequin Melodies, Newbury's RCA debut. Other standout tracks include "The Future's Not What It Used to Be", "Remember the Good", "Frisco Depot", and "How I Love Them Old Songs". The track "San Francisco Mabel Joy" was not initially part of the album, though it is included on some versions. ’Frisco Mabel Joy was collected for CD issue on the eight-disc Mickey Newbury Collection from Mountain Retreat, Newbury's own label in the mid-1990s, along with nine other Newbury albums from 1969 to 1981. In 2011, it was reissued again, both separately and as part of the four-disc Mickey Newbury box set An American Trilogy, alongside two other albums recorded at Cinderella Sound, Looks Like Rain and Heaven Help the Child. This release marks the first time that 'Frisco Mabel Joy has been released on CD in remastered form, after the original master tapes (long thought to have been destroyed in a fire) were rediscovered in 2010.

== Track listing ==
All songs written by Mickey Newbury, except where noted.

1. "An American Trilogy" (Newbury/traditional) – 4:50
2. "How Many Times (Must the Piper Be Paid for His Song)" – 5:48
3. "Interlude" – 1:44
4. "The Future's Not What It Used to Be" – 4:14
5. "Mobile Blue" – 2:48
6. "Frisco Depot" – 3:38
7. "You're Not My Same Sweet Baby" – 3:46
8. "Interlude" – 1:05
9. "Remember the Good" – 2:57
10. "Swiss Cottage Place" – 3:10
11. "How I Love Them Old Songs" – 3:50
12. "San Francisco Mabel Joy" – 5:17

== Personnel ==
- Mickey Newbury – guitar, lead vocals
- Dennis Linde – guitar, backing vocals
- Charlie McCoy – guitar, harmonica
- Bobby Thompson – banjo, guitar
- Wayne Moss – guitar
- Weldon Myrick – steel guitar
- Beegie Adair – keyboards
- Jimmy Capps – guitar
- Jim Isbell – drums
- Buddy Spicher – drums
- Farrell Morris – percussion
- Bob Beckham
- John Harris
- John Moss
- Charles Navarro
- Walker Sill

== Production ==
- Producer: Dennis Linde/Owsley Manier/Robert Rosemurgy
- Recording Engineer: Wayne Linde/Wayne Moss
- Art Direction: Robert L. Heimall
- Photography: Robert L. Heimall
- Liner Notes: unknown

== Charts ==
Album

Billboard (North America)

Year	Chart	Peak position
1972	Pop Albums	58

Single

Year	Single	Chart	Position
1972	"An American Trilogy"	Billboard Pop Singles	26

== Selected cover recordings ==
- "San Francisco Mabel Joy" was covered by folk singer Joan Baez on her 1971 album Blessed Are....
- Kenny Rogers recorded "San Francisco Mabel Joy" on his 1978 album The Gambler.
- John Denver recorded "San Francisco Mabel Joy" on his 1981 album Some Days Are Diamonds.
- Elvis Presley made "An American Trilogy" a part of his Las Vegas shows in 1972, and his version was included on live albums Elvis: As Recorded at Madison Square Garden (1972), Aloha From Hawaii: Via Satellite (1973), Elvis: As Recorded Live on Stage in Memphis (1974), and Elvis' 1972 documentary Elvis on Tour. The song is largely associated with Presley's interpretation, though in execution it is substantively different from Newbury's original version.
- "How I Love Them Old Songs" has merited over thirty different cover versions including recordings by Gene Vincent, Carol Channing, Bill Monroe, and Don Gibson. Mickey Gilley recorded the song on his 1975 album Movin' On, and it was recorded by Tompall Glaser on his 1977 album The Wonder of It All.
- "Remember The Good" has been recorded by Eddy Arnold, Roy Orbison, Brook Benton, and Glenn Yarbrough, among others.
- "Frisco Depot" was recorded by Waylon Jennings in 1972 prior to his breakthrough Lonesome, On'ry and Mean which included Newbury's "San Francisco Mabel Joy" (Jennings has also recorded this album's "Mobile Blue" and "You're Not My Same Sweet Baby"). Robert Forster included "Frisco Depot" on his 1995 covers album I Had a New York Girlfriend. The song has also been covered by Roberta Flack and Ronny Cox.
- Roger Miller recorded "Swiss Cottage Place" prior to the release of Newbury's LP.
- Ronnie Milsap recorded a version of "The Future's Not What It Used To Be" in 1977.
- In 2000 Peter Blackstock, the founder of No Depression magazine, organized a multi-artist tribute that recreated the entire album titled Frisco Mabel Joy Revisited. Artists that participated in the recording include Dave Alvin performing "Mobile Blue," Michael Fracasso's "Remember The Good," and Kris Kristofferson recording "San Francisco Mabel Joy".
- Manowar included "An American Trilogy" on their 2002 album Warriors of the World
