= Mickey Newbury =

American singer-songwriter (1940–2002)

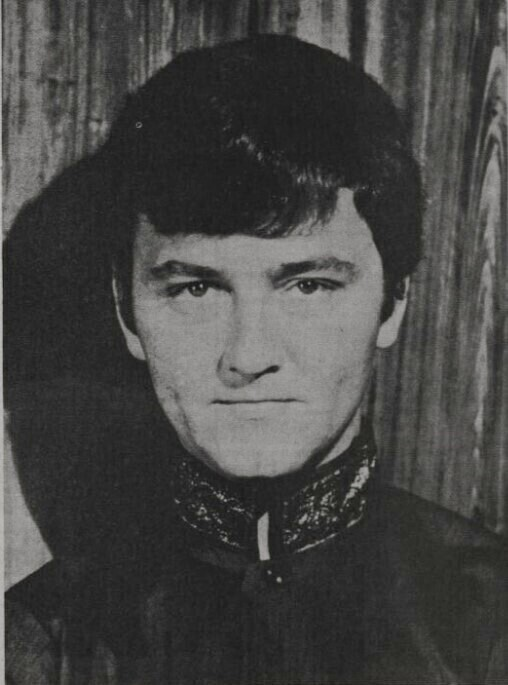
- Newbury, c. 1969

Background information
- Born: Milton Sims Newbury, Jr. May 19, 1940; Houston, Texas, U.S.
- Died: September 29, 2002 (aged 62) Springfield, Oregon, U.S.
- Genres: Progressive country; outlaw country; folk
- Occupation: Singer-songwriter
- Years active: 1964–2002
- Website: mickeynewbury.com

Milton Sims "Mickey" Newbury Jr. (May 19, 1940 – September 29, 2002) was an American singer-songwriter. He is a member of the Nashville Songwriters Hall of Fame.

== Early life and career ==
Newbury was born in Houston, Texas, on May 19, 1940, to Mamie Ellen (née Taylor) and Milton Newbury. As a teenager, Newbury sang tenor in a moderately successful vocal group called The Embers. The group opened for several famous performers, such as Sam Cooke and Johnny Cash. Although Newbury tried to make a living from his music by singing in clubs, he put his musical career on hold at age 19 when he joined the Air Force. After four years in the military, he again set his sights on making a living as a songwriter. Before long, he moved to Nashville and signed with the prestigious publishing company Acuff-Rose Music.

Newbury started out releasing singles of his own, with his first release being "Who's Gonna Cry (When I'm Gone)" in 1964; he also wrote songs for other artists. In 1966, country star Don Gibson had a Top Ten country hit with Newbury's "Funny, Familiar, Forgotten Feelings" while Tom Jones scored a world hit with the same song.

In 1968, Newbury saw success with four Top 5 songs across four charts: "Just Dropped In (To See What Condition My Condition Was In)" No. 5 on the Pop/Rock chart by Kenny Rogers and the First Edition; "Sweet Memories" No. 1 on Easy Listening by Andy Williams; "Time is a Thief" No. 1 on the R&B chart by Solomon Burke; and "Here Comes the Rain Baby" No. 1 on the Country chart by Eddy Arnold. This feat has not been repeated.

== Early career ==
Based on his phenomenal success as a writer, Newbury scored a solo deal with RCA and recorded Harlequin Melodies. Sonically, the album is drastically different from anything else Newbury recorded. He largely disowned the album, considering its successor Looks Like Rain his true debut. In contrast to the subtle expressiveness of Newbury's prime work, Harlequin Melodies is overproduced and packed with often distracting instrumental touches, shifting tempos, and strange production effects. Some of the songs on Harlequin Melodies would be re-recorded by Newbury for later albums, with marked differences. "How Many Times (Must The Piper Be Paid For His Song)" was a highlight of Frisco Mabel Joy; "Good Morning, Dear" and "Sweet Memories" reappeared on Heaven Help the Child, and "Here Comes The Rain Baby" reappeared on A Long Road Home, the second to last album Newbury released. Blue To This Day was his final album, which was finished just before his death and released after he died.

Owing to a verbal agreement with Steve Sholes, Newbury was able to get out of his five-year contract with RCA and sign with Mercury, where he could work with his good friends Jerry Kennedy and Bob Beckham. Just about every aspect of his next recording, Looks Like Rain, was unconventional by Nashville's standards at the time, beginning with Newbury's choice of studio. Cinderella Sound was located in a residential area of Madison and was run by guitarist Wayne Moss, who had converted his two-car garage into a recording studio. Newbury's decision to record outside the Nashville studio system would inspire other country singers, such as Waylon Jennings and Willie Nelson, who were also frustrated by the confines of Music City's traditional recording practices.

Newbury would record three albums at Cinderella Sound that defied categorization. One significant aspect of their production is the inclusion of sound effects to link the songs, which gave the LPs a conceptual feel and would become a Newbury trademark. His next album, Frisco Mabel Joy, includes his most famous song, "An American Trilogy," later made famous by Elvis Presley. The song is actually a medley of three 19th-century songs: "Dixie", a blackface minstrel song composed by Daniel Decatur Emmett that became the unofficial anthem of the Confederacy since the Civil War; "All My Trials", originally a Bahamian lullaby, but closely related to African American spirituals and well known through folk music revivalists; and "The Battle Hymn of the Republic," the marching song of the Union Army during the Civil War.

According to Joe Ziemer's Newbury memoir Crystal & Stone, Newbury was moved to perform the song—which had been banned by some southern radio stations—as a protest against censorship. It is the song most associated with Newbury and his highest-charting original recording, reaching No. 26 in 1972, and No. 9 on Billboard's Easy Listening chart. Newbury's version would remain in the Top 40 for seven weeks. In 1972, Elvis Presley's version reached No. 66 and peaked at No. 31 on the Easy Listening chart, but it became the grandiose highlight of his live shows. The song gained worldwide exposure when Presley performed it during his Aloha From Hawaii television special in January 1973.

== 1970s ==
Throughout the 1970s, Newbury continued recording albums such as Live at Montezuma Hall (1973), Heaven Help the Child (1973), and I Came to Hear the Music (1974), which were critically acclaimed for their unique, mysterious atmosphere and poetic songs. However, they were not great sellers, in part because of their eclecticism and Newbury's growing disdain for the music business, especially in Nashville. By 1975, outlaw country had captivated the industry, led by Willie Nelson and Waylon Jennings. Meanwhile, Newbury was having difficulty keeping his albums in print. Newbury biographer Joe Ziemer summed up the dilemma in Crystal and Stone: "Though diversity derives from aptitude and ability, diversity was Newbury's problem with radio stations. One dominant characteristic of his music is eclecticism, and that's what made his albums unattractive to strict radio formats."

Newbury was not even living in Nashville by 1975, having moved to Oregon with his wife and son. Ironically, his profile could not have been higher on the radio in 1977, albeit in a referential way; in April, Jennings released the No. 1 hit "Luckenbach, Texas (Back to the Basics of Love)," which contains the lines "Between Hank Williams' pain songs, Newbury's train songs..." The song became an instant classic, but most of those who sang along likely had no idea who Newbury was. Although cited by Jennings, Kris Kristofferson, David Allan Coe, and several other country stars as a primary influence on their songwriting and albums, Newbury had little interest in cashing in on the outlaw country movement, telling Peter O'Brien of the Omaha Rainbow in 1977, "It's just categorising again, making a new pigeonhole to stick somebody into. You got to be dressed a certain way, you got to be a drinker and a hell-raiser, cuss and make an ass of yourself, act like a kid. I've told 'em I quit playing cowboys when I grew up. I just get turned off by all that."

In 1976, Newbury signed with ABC Hickory Records and recorded Rusty Tracks (1976), His Eye Is on the Sparrow (1977) and The Sailor (1979). Despite featuring some of the best musicians in Nashville (as well as film scorer Alan Moore), the recordings failed to find an audience, although his work remained highly regarded by critics and fellow artists. In his AllMusic review of The Sailor, Thom Jurek observed, "The Sailor, once again, refused to sell, perhaps because it was too late, perhaps because it was too early—Merle Haggard and George Jones made records that sounded exactly like this only three years later and scored big... Nashville's radio machine wasn't having it, and therefore the public never got the chance to make up its mind."

== 1980s ==
In 1980, Newbury was inducted into the Songwriters Hall of Fame, the youngest person to receive the honor at the time. Newbury signed with PolyGram-Mercury and recorded After All These Years in 1981. After that, he dropped out of sight, not recording again until 1988. He was not completely inactive during this period, appearing on the Bobby Bare and Friends TV show in 1983 and participating on the Canadian program In Session with friend Larry Gatlin the same year. He toured Australia in 1984 and sang "Sweet Memories" during a "guitar pull" as part of the TV special The Door Is Always Open hosted by Waylon Jennings. However, Newbury was disenchanted with the music business, especially after Wesley Rose, who controlled the publishing rights to 300 Newbury compositions, sold the Acuff-Rose publishing company to Opryland USA for $22 million in 1985. Adding to his woes, the IRS came after Newbury. "All that came together at one time... So I wasted what should have been the best years of my life just fightin' off the wolves," he later remarked. "Plus I was old... Nobody wanted me anymore."

In 1988, Airborne Records planned a release in which Newbury demos were treated with synthesizers and other then-contemporary production effects. These demos stemmed from sessions with producer Larry Butler in Nashville in March 1983 and featured new-age synthesizer sounds, which Newbury came to loathe. "I was so drunk then," he later explained. "I hate those cuts and never want to hear 'em again." Newbury also claimed to have thrown a cassette of the recordings on the ground and stomped on it. Newbury was aghast when he heard Airborne was planning to release the recordings and had even printed up the album art, but after learning that no CDs or cassettes had yet been made, Newbury instead re-recorded the songs Airborne planned to use, and the album was released with these new recordings, effectively Newbury's first recordings in years. Newbury recorded the album solo with accompaniment from violinist Marie Rhines.

== Later life ==
In 1994, Newbury resurfaced with the live album Nights When I Am Sane. A year later he was diagnosed with pulmonary fibrosis, which would impact his ability to record and perform for the rest of his life. In 1996, he released Lulled by the Moonlight, his first collection of new compositions since 1981.

Several live recordings followed, including Live in England (1998) and It Might as Well Be the Moon (1999). The final album released in Newbury's lifetime was the autobiographical A Long Road Home in 2002. Like most of his albums, it did not chart but was critically acclaimed, with No Depression's Peter Blackstock calling it "a masterpiece."

Newbury died at age 62 on September 29, 2002 in Springfield, Oregon, following a battle with emphysema.

== Legacy ==
Ralph Emery referred to Newbury as the first "hippie-cowboy," and along with Johnny Cash and Roger Miller, he was one of the first to rebel against the conventions of the Nashville music society. The influence of the production methods can be heard in the albums Waylon Jennings went on to record in the 1970s (with instrumentation highly unconventional for country music), and his poetically sophisticated style of songwriting was highly influential on Kris Kristofferson, who later proclaimed, "I learned more about songwriting from him than any other writer... He was my hero and still is." Newbury gained a reputation as a "songwriter's songwriter" and a mentor to others. It was Newbury who convinced Roger Miller to record Kristofferson's "Me & Bobby McGee", which went on to launch Kristofferson as country music's top songwriter. Newbury is also responsible for getting Townes Van Zandt and Guy Clark to move to Nashville and pursue careers as songwriters. Van Zandt later described how Newbury's voice impressed him: "I can't really call it 'explain' but I'd tried to tell Jeanene (Van Zandt's wife) about the sound of Mickey's voice and the guitar on a good night at the same time. It's hard; you can't do it. It's like from outer space. I've heard about people trying to explain a color to a blind person... There's no way to do it." During a show in Galway, Ireland, John Prine said, "Mickey Newbury is probably the best songwriter ever."

According to his official website, Newbury has had over 1,500 versions of his songs recorded across many genres of music. His work would be recorded by singers and songwriters such as Johnny Cash, Vampire Weekend, Bob Luman, Roy Orbison, Tennessee Ernie Ford, Bill Monroe, Johnny Rodriguez, Hank Snow, Ray Charles, Tony Rice, Jerry Lee Lewis, Tammy Wynette, Ray Price, Don Gibson, Ronnie Milsap, Brenda Lee, Lynn Anderson, Charlie Rich, David Allan Coe, Sammi Smith, Joan Baez, Tom Jones, Willie Nelson, Waylon Jennings, John Denver, Kenny Rogers, Steve Von Till, B. B. King, Linda Ronstadt, Dax Riggs, Bobby "Blue" Bland, and Bill Callahan, among many others. Elvis Presley's cover of "An American Trilogy" is especially famous. Presley began performing the song in concert in 1972 and released it as a single. He performed it in the 1972 documentary Elvis on Tour and in his 1973 international satellite telecast Elvis—Aloha from Hawaii.

In 2014, Paal Flaata released an album of only Mickey Newbury songs, Bless Us All – Songs of Mickey Newbury.

In 2020, fellow Nashville Songwriters Hall of Fame member Gretchen Peters released an album of Newbury songs entitled The Night You Wrote That Song: The Songs of Mickey Newbury, which received critical acclaim and debuted at No. 1 on the FAI Folk chart, and reached No. 1 on the UK Official Country Artists Albums Chart.

Looks Like Rain: The Songwriting Legacy of Mickey Newbury by author Brian T. Atkinson was published by Texas A&M University Press in 2021. The book includes forewords by Larry Gatlin and Don McLean.

Many of Newbury's songs, such as "The Thirty-Third of August", "The Future Is Not What It Used To Be", and "Just Dropped In (To See What Condition My Condition Was In)", delve into the dark recesses of the human psyche. Newbury, who battled depression in his life, later reflected, "How many people have listened to my songs and thought, 'He must have a bottle of whiskey in one hand and a pistol in the other.' Well, I don't. I write my sadness."

== Discography ==
=== Studio albums ===
Year	Album	Chart Positions			Label
Year	Album	US Country	US	AUS	Label
1968	Harlequin Melodies	—	—	—	RCA Victor
1969	Looks Like Rain	—	—	—	Mercury
1971	Frisco Mabel Joy	29	58	—	Elektra
1973	Heaven Help the Child	—	173	—	Elektra
1974	I Came to Hear the Music	—	209	80	Elektra
1975	Lovers	—	172	—	Elektra
1977	Rusty Tracks	—	—	—	Hickory
1978	His Eye Is on the Sparrow	—	—	—	Hickory
1979	The Sailor	—	—	—	Hickory
1981	After All These Years	—	—	—	Mercury
1985	Sweet Memories	—	—	—	Airborne
1988	In a New Age	—	—	—	Airborne
1996	Lulled by the Moonlight	—	—	—	Mountain Retreat
2000	Stories from the Silver Moon Cafe	—	—	—	Mountain Retreat
2002	A Long Road Home	—	—	—	Mountain Retreat
2003	Blue to This Day	—	—	—	Mountain Retreat

=== Live albums ===
Year	Album	Label	Notes
1973	Live at Montezuma Hall	Elektra	Recorded in March 1973
1994	Nights When I Am Sane	Winter Harvest	Recorded in March 1994, also released on VHS
1998	Live in England	Mountain Retreat	Recorded in 1993
2002	Winter Winds	Mountain Retreat	Recorded in 1994

=== Compilation albums ===
Year	Album	Label	Notes
1972	Sings His Own	RCA Victor	Alternate version of Harlequin Melodies
1991	Best of Mickey Newbury	Curb	
1999	It Might as Well Be the Moon	Mountain Retreat	2-CD set of In a New Age and a live recording
2011	An American Trilogy	Saint Cecilia Knows/Mountain Retreat	Box set

=== Singles ===
Year	Single	Chart Positions						Album
Year	Single	US Country	US	CAN Country	CAN	CAN AC	AUS	Album
1968	"Weeping Annaleah"	—	—	—	—	—	—	Harlequin Melodies
1968	"Got Down on Saturday (Sunday in the Rain)"	—	—	—	—	—	—	Sings His Own
1969	"Queen"	—	—	—	—	—		Sings His Own
1969	"San Francisco Mabel Joy"	—	—	—	—	—	—	Looks Like Rain
1970	"Sad Satin Rhyme"	—	—	—	—	—	—	single only
1972	"An American Trilogy"	—	26	—	76	—	30	'Frisco Mabel Joy
1972	"Remember the Good"	—	—	—	—	—	—	'Frisco Mabel Joy
1973	"Heaven Help the Child"	—	103	—	—	—	—	Heaven Help the Child
1973	"Sunshine"	53	87	50	—	41	—	Heaven Help the Child
1974	"If I Could Be"	—	—	—	—	—	—	I Came to Hear the Music
1974	"Baby's Not Home"	—	—	—	—	—	51	I Came to Hear the Music
1975	"Lovers"	—	—	—	—	—	—	Lovers
1975	"Sail Away"	—	—	—	—	—	—	Lovers
1977	"Hand Me Another of Those"	94	—	—	—	—	—	Rusty Tracks
1977	"Makes Me Wonder If I Ever Said Goodbye"	—	—	—	—	—	—	Rusty Tracks
1978	"Gone to Alabama"	94	—	—	—	—	—	His Eye Is on the Sparrow
1978	"It Doesn't Matter Anymore"	—	—	—	—	—	—	His Eye Is on the Sparrow
1979	"Looking for the Sunshine"	82	—	—	—	—	—	Sailor
1979	"Blue Sky Shinin'"	81	—	—	—	—	—	Sailor
1980	"America the Beautiful"	82	—	—	—	—	—	single only
1981	"Country Boy Saturday Night"	—	—	—	—	—	—	After All These Years
1988	"An American Trilogy"	93	—	—	—	—	—	In a New Age

Awards
Preceded by John Hartford	AMA presidents Award; 2006	Succeeded by Townes Van Zandt
