= Looks Like Rain =

Studio album by Mickey Newbury
- Released: September 1969
- Recorded: 1969
- Studio: Cinderella Sound, Nashville, Tennessee
- Genre: Progressive country
- Length: 37:35
- Label: Mercury
- Producer: Bob Beckham and Jerry Kennedy

Mickey Newbury chronology
Harlequin Melodies (1968)	Looks Like Rain (1969)	Frisco Mabel Joy (1971)

Singles from Looks Like Rain
- 1. "San Francisco Mabel Joy" Released: September 1969

Professional ratings
Review scores
Source	Rating
AllMusic	5/5 stars
Christgau's Record Guide	B−

Looks Like Rain is a 1969 concept album by singer-songwriter Mickey Newbury. After recording his debut album with RCA, Newbury was dissatisfied with the resulting album and left RCA to pursue a style closer to his tastes. Recorded at Cinderella Sound, as his next two albums would be, the result is widely considered his first real recording and represents a peak in the singer songwriter movement, especially for Nashville. The sound and style of the record would be highly influential during the Outlaw Movement during country music in the 1970s especially on albums by David Allan Coe and Waylon Jennings. Linking the tracks with delicate arrangements and liberal amount of atmosphere (almost all tracks feature rain sound effects), the record contains some of Newbury's most celebrated compositions including "She Even Woke Me Up to Say Goodbye", "33rd of August", "I Don't Think Much About Her No More", and "San Francisco Mabel Joy". AllMusic's review of the album concludes, "Looks Like Rain is so fine, so mysterious in its pace, dimension, quark strangeness and charm, it defies any attempt at strict categorization or criticism; a rare work of genius."

Looks Like Rain was collected for CD issue on the eight-disc Mickey Newbury Collection from Mountain Retreat, Newbury's own label in the mid-1990s, along with nine other Newbury albums from 1969 to 1981. In 2011, it was reissued again, both separately and as part of the four-disc Mickey Newbury box set An American Trilogy, alongside two other albums recorded at Cinderella Sound, Frisco Mabel Joy and Heaven Help the Child. This release marks the first time that Looks Like Rain has been released on CD in remastered form, after the original master tapes (long thought to have been destroyed in a fire) were rediscovered in 2010.

== Track listing ==
All tracks composed by Mickey Newbury; except where indicated

1. "Write a Song a Song/Angeline"
2. "She Even Woke Me Up to Say Goodbye" (Mickey Newbury, Doug Gilmore)
3. "I Don't Think Much About Her No More"
4. "T. Total Tommy"
5. "33rd of August/When the Baby in My Lady Gets the Blues"
6. "San Francisco Mabel Joy"
7. "Looks Like Baby's Gone"

== Personnel ==
- Mickey Newbury – vocals, guitar
- Charlie McCoy – harmonica, guitar, bass pedals
- Wayne Moss – guitar, engineer
- Jerry Kennedy – guitar, sitar
- Farrell Morris – percussion
- Charlie Tallent – engineer

== Selected cover recordings ==
- The Box Tops recorded a presumably early version of "San Francisco Mabel Joy" under the title "Georgia Farm Boy," which was included as a bonus track on the 2000 reissue of 1967's The Letter/Neon Rainbow.
- Gordon Lightfoot recorded an unreleased version of "The 33rd of August" before leaving United Artists.
- Jerry Lee Lewis had a #2 hit with "She Even Woke Me Up To Say Goodbye" in 1969 which became the title track of a top ten album in 1970. Several dozen artists have cut versions of the song including Roy Orbison, Keith Richards, Kenny Rogers and The First Edition, and Ronnie Milsap.
- Waylon Jennings cut "The 33rd of August" for his 1970 album Waylon.
- Joan Baez recorded "San Francisco Mabel Joy," "Angeline," and "33rd of August" for her 1971 hit double album Blessed Are...
- Waylon Jennings included "San Francisco Mabel Joy" on his 1973 breakthrough Lonesome, On'ry and Mean.
- Johnny Cash performed "I Don't Think Much About Her No More" with the Tennessee Three on his ABC show on October 7, 1970. Bobby Bare recorded "I Don't Think Much About Her No More" in 1973. Tammy Wynette recorded the song for her 1974 album Woman to Woman. Don Williams also recorded the song the same year. Vampire Weekend recorded "I Don't Think Much About Her No More" on their 2019 album Father of the Bride as a bonus track.
- "The 33rd of August" was recorded by David Allan Coe on his 1974 Columbia Records debut The Mysterious Rhinestone Cowboy.
- "San Francisco Mabel Joy" was featured on Kenny Rogers' 1978 country smash The Gambler
- John Denver recorded "San Francisco Mabel Joy" on his 1981 album Some Days Are Diamonds.
