= An American Trilogy =

Single by Elvis Presley
- B-side: "The First Time Ever I Saw Your Face"
- Released: April 4, 1972
- Recorded: February 16, 1972
- Venue: Las Vegas Hilton, Las Vegas, Nevada
- Genre: Popular, country, gospel
- Length: 4:34
- Label: RCA Victor
- Songwriter: Mickey Newbury
- Producer: Felton Jarvis

Elvis Presley singles chronology
| "He Touched Me" / "Bosom of Abraham" (1972) | "An American Trilogy" / "The First Time Ever I Saw Your Face" (1972) | "Burning Love" / "It's a Matter of Time" (1972) |

"An American Trilogy" is a 1972 song medley arranged by country composer Mickey Newbury and popularized by Elvis Presley, who included it as a showstopper in his concerts. The medley uses three 19th-century songs:

- "Dixie" – a popular folk song about the Southern United States;
- "The Battle Hymn of the Republic" – a marching hymn of the Union Army during the American Civil War; and
- "All My Trials" – a Bahamian lullaby related to African American spirituals and widely used by folk music revivalists.

== First performances ==
Newbury first recorded "An American Trilogy" for his 1971 album Frisco Mabel Joy, and the medley featured prominently on his first concert album, Live at Montezuma Hall, released in 1973. The studio recording reached No. 26 on the charts in 1972, and No. 9 on Billboard's Easy Listening chart. Newbury's version was used during the nightly sign-off sequences for American television stations KTBS-TV (Shreveport), KLFY-TV (Lafayette), and WRBT (Baton Rouge) beginning in the middle- to late-1970s.

Presley began singing "An American Trilogy" in concert in January 1972; a live recording made the following month was released as a single by RCA Records. Presley modifies Newbury's sequence by reprising after "All My Trials" both "Dixie" in a solo flute passage, credited by Elvis discographies to James Mulidore, and with a bigger ending on "Battle Hymn". He performs the medley in the 1972 concert film Elvis on Tour. Presley's version did not equal the US chart success of Newbury's single, reaching No. 66 late in 1972 and peaking at No. 31 on the Easy Listening chart. However, it was included in both versions of the widely-seen 1973 satellite telecast Aloha from Hawaii. Presley's recording was more successful in the UK, where it reached No. 8.

== Other versions ==
The medley was covered by heavy metal band Manowar, appearing as the sixth track on the album Warriors of the World in 2002. It was also featured on country singer Billy "Crash" Craddock's live album Live -N- Kickin' in 2009. Alwyn Humphreys' arrangement for male choir is popular and features on albums by the Cardiff Arms Park Male Choir and Morriston Orpheus Choir. "An American Trilogy" is referenced and partially sung in the Manic Street Preachers' "Elvis Impersonator: Blackpool Pier" on the Everything Must Go album. Presley's version from Aloha From Hawaii was also arranged for the Royal Philharmonic Orchestra for the 2015 compilation album If I Can Dream. In all, over 465 versions have been recorded by various artists.

== Charts ==
Mickey Newbury

| Chart (1971–72, 1975) | Peak position |
|---|---|
| Australia (Kent Music Report) | 30 |
| Canadian RPM Top Singles | 76 |
| French Singles Chart | 53 |
| UK Singles Chart | 42 |
| US Billboard Hot Country Singles | 93 |
| US Billboard Hot 100 | 26 |
| US Billboard Easy Listening | 9 |

Elvis Presley

| Chart (1972) | Peak position |
|---|---|
| Sweden | 11 |
| UK Singles Chart | 8 |
| US Billboard Hot 100 | 66 |
| US Billboard Easy Listening | 31 |
| US Cash Box Top 100 | 73 |

== Certifications ==
| Region | Certification | Certified units/sales |
|---|---|---|
| United Kingdom (BPI) Elvis Presley version | Gold | 400,000^{‡} |
^{‡} Sales+streaming figures based on certification alone.
