= Tanya Tucker albums discography =

Tanya Tucker discography
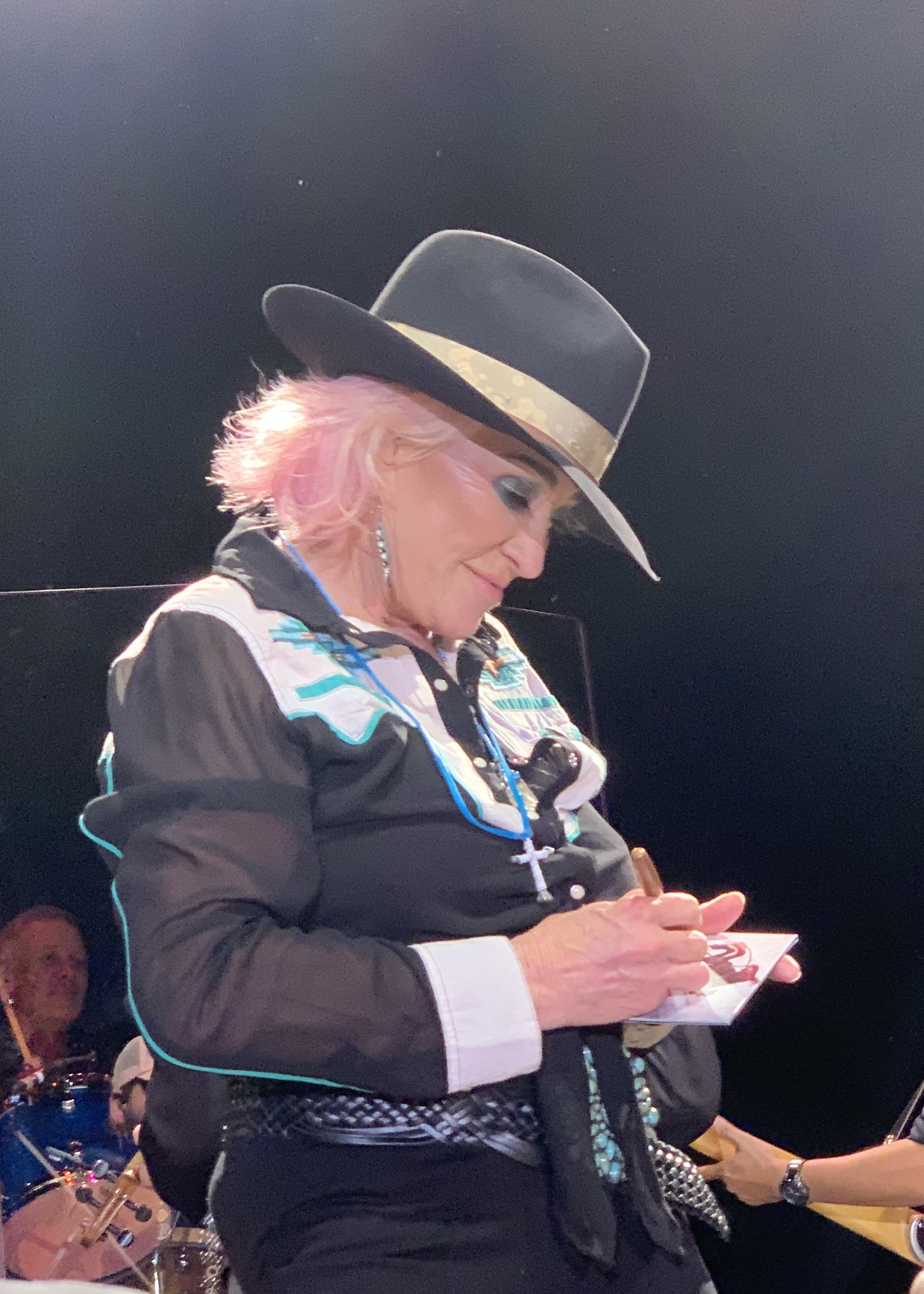
- Tucker signing autographs in Biloxi, Mississippi, in 2019.
- Studio albums: 26
- Live albums: 3
- Compilation albums: 30
- Video albums: 9
- Box sets: 1

The albums discography of American country artist Tanya Tucker consists of 26 studio albums, three live albums, 30 compilation albums, nine video albums and one box set. At age 13, Tucker released her debut album via Columbia Records titled Delta Dawn (1972). It peaked at number 32 on the Billboard Top Country Albums chart. The following year she released What's Your Mama's Name, followed by Would You Lay with Me (In a Field of Stone). Both studio albums certified gold by the RIAA. Tucker switched to MCA Records in 1975 and released a self-titled album the same year. It peaked at number 8 on the Top Country Albums chart and number 113 on the Billboard 200 records chart. Between 1976 and 1977 she issued four studio albums before the release of her 1978's TNT, which was marketed towards a rock audience. It also certified gold from the RIAA.

After releasing three commercially unsuccessful albums, Tucker made a successful comeback on Capitol Records with Girls Like Me (1986). The album peaked at number 20 on the Top Country Albums chart and produced four top 10 hits on the Billboard Hot Country Songs chart. Tucker released three more successful albums in the 1980s: Love Me Like You Used To (1987), Strong Enough to Bend (1988), and the compilation Greatest Hits (1989). Tucker's 1991 studio release What Do I Do with Me became her first album to certify platinum by the RIAA. The album also certified gold in Canada. In 1992, Can't Run from Yourself reached number 12 on the Top Country Albums chart and number 51 on the Billboard 200. It would also certify platinum in the United States. After releasing three more studio albums in the 1990s, Tucker issued 2002's Tanya, which was in conjunction with her own Tuckertime record label. In 2009 Tucker released her twenty fourth studio album, My Turn, which featured covers of classic country hits. After a 10-year hiatus, Tucker returned in 2019 with the studio album While I'm Livin'. It was produced by Brandi Carlile and Shooter Jennings.

== Studio albums ==
=== 1970s ===
List of albums, with selected chart positions and certifications, showing year released and album name
| Title | Album details | Peak chart positions | | | | Certifications |
| Title | Album details | US | US Cou. | CAN | CAN Cou. | Certifications |
|---|---|---|---|---|---|---|
| Delta Dawn | Released: September 11, 1972; Label: Columbia; Format: LP, cassette, 8-track | — | 32 | — | — | |
| What's Your Mama's Name | Released: May 21, 1973; Label: Columbia; Format: LP, cassette, 8-track | — | 4 | — | — | RIAA: Gold |
| Would You Lay with Me (In a Field of Stone) | Released: February 11, 1974; Label: Columbia; Format: LP, cassette, 8-track | 159 | 4 | — | — | RIAA: Gold |
| Tanya Tucker | Released: April 21, 1975; Label: MCA; Format: LP, cassette, 8-track | 113 | 8 | — | — | |
| Lovin' and Learnin' | Released: January 5, 1976; Label: MCA; Format: LP, cassette, 8-track | — | 3 | 91 | — | |
| Here's Some Love | Released: September 6, 1976; Label: MCA; Format: LP, cassette, 8-track | 203 | 1 | — | — | |
| Ridin' Rainbows | Released: February 14, 1977; Label: MCA; Format: LP, cassette, 8-track | — | 16 | — | — | |
| TNT | Released: November 6, 1978; Label: MCA; Format: LP, cassette, 8-track | 54 | 2 | 52 | 2 | MC: Gold; RIAA: Gold |
| Tear Me Apart | Released: October 29, 1979; Label: MCA; Format: LP, cassette, 8-track | 121 | 33 | 90 | — | |
"—" denotes a recording that did not chart or was not released in that territory.

=== 1980s ===
List of albums, with selected chart positions and certifications, showing year released and album name
| Title | Album details | Peak chart positions | | | Certifications |
| Title | Album details | US | US Cou. | CAN Cou. | Certifications |
|---|---|---|---|---|---|
| Dreamlovers | Released: September 29, 1980; Label: MCA; Format: LP, cassette, 8-track | 209 | 41 | — | |
| Should I Do It | Released: June 29, 1981; Label: MCA; Format: LP, cassette, 8-track | 180 | 48 | — | |
| Changes | Released: September 6, 1982; Label: Arista; Format: LP, cassette | 203 | 47 | — | |
| Girls Like Me | Released: March 3, 1986; Label: Capitol Nashville; Format: LP, cassette, CD | — | 20 | — | |
| Love Me Like You Used To | Released: July 21, 1987; Label: Capitol Nashville; Format: LP, cassette, CD | — | 12 | — | RIAA: Gold |
| Strong Enough to Bend | Released: August 8, 1988; Label: Capitol Nashville; Format: LP, cassette, CD | — | 9 | 25 | RIAA: Gold |
"—" denotes a recording that did not chart or was not released in that territory.

=== 1990s ===
List of albums, with selected chart positions and certifications, showing year released and album name
| Title | Album details | Peak chart positions | | | Certifications |
| Title | Album details | US | US Cou. | CAN Cou. | Certifications |
|---|---|---|---|---|---|
| Tennessee Woman | Released: April 17, 1990; Label: Capitol Nashville; Format: LP, cassette, CD | — | 18 | — | RIAA: Gold |
| Greatest Hits Encore (re-recordings) | Released: August 7, 1990; Label: Capitol Nashville; Format: Cassette, CD | — | — | — | |
| What Do I Do with Me | Released: July 2, 1991; Label: Capitol Nashville; Format: LP, cassette, CD | 48 | 6 | 10 | MC: Platinum; RIAA: Platinum |
| Can't Run from Yourself | Released: October 6, 1992; Label: Liberty; Formats: Cassette, CD | 51 | 12 | 4 | MC: Platinum; RIAA: Platinum |
| Soon | Released: October 19, 1993; Label: Liberty; Formats: Cassette, CD | 87 | 18 | 11 | MC: Gold; RIAA: Gold |
| Fire to Fire | Released: March 21, 1995; Label: Liberty; Formats: Cassette, CD | 169 | 29 | — | |
| Complicated | Released: March 25, 1997; Label: Capitol Nashville; Formats: Cassette, CD | 124 | 15 | 11 | |
"—" denotes a recording that did not chart or was not released in that territory.

=== 2000s–present ===
List of albums, with selected chart positions, showing year released and album name
| Title | Album details | Peak chart positions | | | | | Sales |
| Title | Album details | US | US Cou. | US Fol. | SCO | UK Cou. | Sales |
|---|---|---|---|---|---|---|---|
| Tanya | Released: September 24, 2002; Label: Capitol Nashville/Tuckertime; Formats: CD, cassette | — | 39 | — | — | — | |
| My Turn | Released: June 30, 2009; Label: Saguaro Road; Formats: CD, digital download | 183 | 27 | — | — | — | |
| While I'm Livin' | Released: August 23, 2019; Label: Fantasy; Formats: LP, CD, digital download | 68 | 8 | 2 | 60 | 2 | US: 44,200 |
| Sweet Western Sound | Released: June 2, 2023; Label: Fantasy; Formats: LP, CD, digital download | — | — | — | — | — | |
"—" denotes a recording that did not chart or was not released in that territory.

== Compilation albums ==
=== 1970s ===
List of albums, with selected chart positions and certifications, showing year released and album name
| Title | Album details | Peak chart positions | | Certifications |
| Title | Album details | US | US Cou. | Certifications |
|---|---|---|---|---|
| Greatest Hits | Released: December 2, 1974; Label: Columbia; Format: LP, cassette, 8-track | 201 | 18 | MC: Gold; RIAA: Platinum |
| You Are So Beautiful | Released: August 15, 1977; Label: Columbia; Format: LP, cassette, 8-track | — | 44 | |
| Would You Lay with Me | Released: 1978; Label: CBS; Formats: LP | — | — | |
| Tanya Tucker's Greatest Hits | Released: March 13, 1978; Label: MCA; Format: LP, cassette, 8-track | 210 | 35 | |
| Sound Elegance | Released: 1979; Label: MCA; Formats: LP | — | — | |
"—" denotes a recording that did not chart or was not released in that territory.

=== 1980s ===
List of albums, with selected chart positions and certifications, showing year released and album name
| Title | Album details | Peak chart positions | Certifications |
| Title | Album details | US Country | Certifications |
|---|---|---|---|
| The Sound of Tanya Tucker | Released: 1982; Label: CSP; Formats: LP, cassette | — | |
| Lizzie and the Rainman | Released: 1985; Label: MCA; Formats: Cassette, CD | — | |
| The Best of Tanya Tucker | Released: September 13, 1982; Label: MCA; Format: LP, cassette | — | |
| Greatest Hits | Released: July 25, 1989; Label: Capitol Nashville; Format: LP, cassette, CD | 20 | RIAA: Gold |
"—" denotes a recording that did not chart or was not released in that territory.

=== 1990s ===
List of albums, with selected chart positions and certifications, showing year released and album name
| Title | Album details | Peak chart positions | | Certifications |
| Title | Album details | US | US Cou. | Certifications |
|---|---|---|---|---|
| Greatest Country Hits | Released: 1991; Label: Curb; Formats: CD, cassette | — | — | |
| All-Time Greatest Hits | Released: 1991; Label: CEMA/EMI; Formats: CD, cassette | — | — | |
| The Legendary Tanya Tucker | Released: 1991; Label: Capitol; Formats: Cassette | — | — | |
| Country Classics | Released: 1991; Label: Capitol; Formats: CD | — | — | |
| Hits | Released: 1992; Label: EMI/Liberty; Formats: CD, cassette | — | — | |
| Tanya Tucker Collection | Released: 1992; Label: MCA; Formats: CD, cassette | — | — | |
| Best of My Love | Released: 1992; Label: Sony; Formats: CD | — | — | |
| Greatest Hits | Released: 1993; Label: CEMA; Formats: CD, cassette | — | — | |
| Nothin' But the Best | Released: 1993; Label: MCA; Formats: CD | — | — | |
| Greatest Hits 1990–1992 | Released: April 20, 1993; Label: Capitol Nashville; Format: LP, cassette, CD | 65 | 15 | MC: Gold; RIAA: Platinum |
| Love Songs | Released: August 20, 1996; Label: Capitol Nashville; Format: CD | — | — | |
| Country Classics | Released: 1997; Label: EMI; Formats: CD | — | — | |
| Greatest Hits | Released: 1997; Label: EMI/Razor & Tie; Formats: CD | — | — | |
| Super Hits | Released: February 17, 1998; Label: Columbia/Sony; Formats: CD, cassette | — | — | |
"—" denotes a recording that did not chart or was not released in that territory.

=== 2000s–2010s ===
List of albums, showing year released and album name
| Title | Album details |
|---|---|
| Country Classics II | Released: 2000; Label: EMI; Formats: CD |
| Country Greatest | Released: 2000; Label: EMI; Formats: CD |
| Sisters: An Anthology (with LaCosta) | Released: June 20, 2000; Label: Renaissance; Formats: CD |
| 20 Greatest Hits | Released: September 26, 2000; Label: Capitol Nashville; Format: CD |
| 20th Century Masters: The Millennium Collection | Released: October 31, 2000; Label: MCA Nashville; Format: CD |
| 16 Biggest Hits | Released: February 21, 2006; Label: Legacy; Format: CD, music download |
| Icon | Released: February 4, 2014; Label: Capitol Nashville; Formats: CD |

== Live albums ==
List of albums, with selected chart positions, showing year released and album name
| Title | Album details | Peak chart positions |
| Title | Album details | US Country |
|---|---|---|
| Live | Released: March 1, 1982; Label: MCA; Format: LP, cassette, 8-track | 67 |
| Live at Billy Bob's Texas | Released: September 13, 2005; Label: Smith; Format: CD | — |
| Live from the Troubadour | Released: October 16, 2020; Label: Fantasy; Format: CD, LP, digital download | — |
"—" denotes a recording that did not chart or was not released in that territory.

== Box sets ==
List of albums, showing year released and album name
| Title | Album details |
|---|---|
| Tanya Tucker | Released: September 12, 1995; Label: Liberty; Formats: CD |

== Video albums ==
List of albums, showing all relevant details
| Title | Album details |
|---|---|
| Tanya Tucker | Released: July 30, 1991; Label: Capitol Home Video; Format: VHS |
| Video Hits | Released: October 20, 1992; Label: Capitol Home Video; Format: VHS |
| Country Workout | Released: October 6, 1993; Label: Eurpac Home Entertainment; Format: VHS |
| Video Hits and More | Released: August 27, 2002; Label: Capitol Home Video; Format: DVD |
| Cheyenne Saloon, Volume 3 (featuring Lee Greenwood, Kathy Mattea and Mel Tillis) | Released: 2003; Label: Waterfall Studios; Formats: DVD |
| Live at Billy Bob's Texas | Released: September 30, 2005; Label: Smith Entertainment; Format: DVD |
| Tanya Tucker | Released: 2006; Label: Quantum Leap; Formats: DVD |
| Tanya Tucker Live | Released: 2007; Label: Pegasus Entertainment; Formats: DVD |
| In Concert | Released: February 26, 2008; Label: Alpha Centauri Entertainment; Format: DVD |

== Other album appearances ==
List of other album appearances, showing year released, other artists, and album name.
| Title | Year | Other artist(s) | Album |
|---|---|---|---|
| "Sister's Coming Home" | 1979 | Emmylou Harris | Blue Kentucky Girl |
| "Away in a Manger" | 1980 | —N/a | Christmas with the Country Stars |
| "Silent Night" | 1980 | —N/a | Christmas with the Country Stars |
| "The Night the Lights Went Out in Georgia" | 1981 | —N/a | The Night the Lights Went Out in Georgia |
| "Rodeo Girls" | 1981 | —N/a | The Night the Lights Went Out in Georgia |
| "You'll Never Take the Texas Out of Me" | 1981 | Big Bird | Sesame Street: Sesame Country |
| "Winter Wonderland" | 1990 | —N/a | Christmas for the 90's, Volume 1 |
| "What Child Is This?" | 1990 | —N/a | Christmas for the 90's, Volume 2 |
| "Back in Harmony" | 1991 | Charlie Louvin | 50 Years of Makin' Music |
| "A Voice Still Rings True" | 1995 | Ricky Skaggs and Lisa Stewart | Keith Whitley: A Tribute Album |
| "Somethin' Else" | 1995 | Little Richard | Rhythm Country and Blues |
| "Something" | 1995 | —N/a | Come Together: American Salutes the Beatles |
| "Christmas to Christmas" | 1995 | —N/a | Christmas for the 90's, Volume 3 |
| "The Wonder" | 1995 | —N/a | Christmas for the 90's, Volume 3 |
| "Some Day My Prince Will Come" | 1996 | —N/a | The Best of Country Sing the Best of Disney |
| "Going Nowhere and Gettin' There Fast" | 1996 | —N/a | NASCAR: Hotter Than Asphalt |
| "The Wild Side of Life" / "It Wasn't God Who Made Honky Tonk Angels" | 1997 | Hank Thompson and Kitty Wells | Hank Thompson & Friends |
| "Reggae Cowboy" | 2005 | The Bellamy Brothers and David Allan Cole | Angels & Outlaws, Vol. 1 |
| "Heart to Heart Talk" | 2005 | Bob Wills | Bob Wills: A Tribute to Bob's 100th Birthday |
| "Take Me Back to Tulsa" | 2005 | Bob Wills, Porter Wagoner and Terry Bradshaw | Bob Wills: A Tribute to Bob's 100th Birthday |
| "Mississippi" | 2005 | Billy Don Burns | Heroes, Friends & Other Troubled Souls |
| "Window Up Above" | 2006 | —N/a | God's Country: George Jones and Friends |
| "Let It Snow! Let It Snow! Let It Snow!" | 2006 | —N/a | Still Believing in Christmas |
| "Played the Game Too Long" | 2007 | Billy Joe Shaver | Everybody's Brother |
| "Don't Go Breaking My Heart" | 2008 | Ty Herndon | Gone Country: 70s Rock |
| "An American Woman" | 2008 | —N/a | Never Forget... |
| "Livin' Proof Your Love Is Killin' Me" | 2011 | Daryl Pillow | Finally |
| "Delta Dawn" | 2012 | Terri Clark | Classic |
| "The Rough Crowd" | 2013 | Gary Chapman and John Rich | The Truth |
| "Embraceable You" | 2013 | Frank Sinatra | Duets: Twentieth Anniversary |
| "The Rough Crowd" | 2013 | Gary Chapman and John Rich | The Truth |
| "Texas (When I Die)" | 2014 | Mary Sarah | Bridges |
| "You Better Hope You Die Young" | 2017 | Hellbound Glory | Pinball: Junkie Edition |
| "Meet in the Middle" | 2019 | Stoney LaRue | Onward |
| "Joan of Arkansas" | 2020 | Lena Paige | Roses in December |
| "The Farmer's Daughter" (Live) | 2020 | —N/a | Sing Me Back Home: The Music of Merle Haggard |
| "Okie from Muskogee" (Live) | 2020 | Various (Note: Aaron Lewis, Alabama, Ben Haggard, Billy F. Gibbons, Bobby Bare, Buddy Miller, Chris Janson, Connie Smith, Dierks Bentley, Hank Williams Jr., Jake Owen, Jamey Johnson, John Anderson, Kacey Musgraves, Keith Richards, Kenny Chesney, Loretta Lynn, Lucinda Williams, Lynyrd Skynyrd, Miranda Lambert, Rodney Crowell, Ronnie Dunn, Sheryl Crow, The Avett Brothers, Theresa Haggard, Toby Keith, Warren Haynes, and Willie Nelson) | Sing Me Back Home: The Music of Merle Haggard |
| "You Ain't Woman Enough" | 2021 | Loretta Lynn | Still Woman Enough |
| "When the Roll Is Called Up Yonder" | 2021 | Leslie Jordan | Company's Comin' |
| "Never Again, Every Time" | 2021 | Leigh Nash | The Tide, Vol. 1 |
| "Maybe She Lied" | 2021 | Scott Coner | A Change in Direction |
| "Higher" | 2021 | Eddie Montgomery | Ain't No Closing Me Down |
| "Maybe She Lied" (Acoustic) | 2022 | Scott Coner | The Mauxferry Chronicles, Vol. 3 |
