= Tanya Tucker's Greatest Hits =

Greatest hits album by Tanya Tucker
- Released: March 13, 1978
- Genre: Country
- Length: 36:58
- Label: MCA
- Producer: Jerry Crutchfield, Snuff Garrett

Tanya Tucker chronology
Ridin' Rainbows (1977)	Tanya Tucker's Greatest Hits (1978)	TNT (1978)

Tanya Tucker's Greatest Hits is the second compilation album by the American country music artist Tanya Tucker. It was released on March 13, 1978 via MCA Records.

== Track listing ==
No.	Title	Writer(s)	Length
1.	"Here's Some Love"	Richard Mainegra, Jack Roberts	2:59
2.	"Ridin' Rainbows"	Connie Ethridge, Jan Crutchfield, Susan Pugh	2:40
3.	"Pride of Franklin County"	Barbara Keith, Doug Tibbles	3:27
4.	"Dancing the Night Away"	James H. Brown Jr., Russell Smith	3:31
5.	"Wait 'Til Daddy Finds Out"	Dave Loggins	2:56
6.	"Let's Keep It That Way"	Curly Putman, Rafe Van Hoy	3:52
7.	"San Antonio Stroll"	Peter Noah	2:48
8.	"Don't Believe My Heart Can Stand Another You"	Billy Ray Reynolds	2:48
9.	"Short Cut"	Alan Kroeber, Lisa MacGregor	3:17
10.	"You've Got Me to Hold On To"	Loggins	3:04
11.	"Lizzie and the Rainman"	Kenny O'Dell, Larry Henley	3:05
12.	"It's a Cowboy Lovin' Night"	Ronnie Rogers	2:31

== Chart performance ==
Chart (1978)	Peak position
US Top Country Albums (Billboard)	18
