= You Are So Beautiful (album) =

Compilation album by Tanya Tucker
- Released: June 1977
- Genre: Country
- Label: Columbia
- Producer: Billy Sherrill

Tanya Tucker chronology
Ridin' Rainbows (1977)	You Are So Beautiful (1977)	Tanya Tucker's Greatest Hits (1978)

You Are So Beautiful is a compilation album by American country music singer Tanya Tucker. It was released in June 1977 by Columbia Records and with producer Billy Sherrill. It consisted of songs Tucker had recorded several years prior while still recording for Columbia. The highest-charting single was "Spring," which rose to #18 on the Billboard C&W chart in 1975, two years before the album's release, that single having been released by Columbia to compete with Tucker's debut MCA single, the #1 C&W hit "Lizzie and the Rainman". At the time the You Are So Beautiful album was released, Tucker's rendition of the title track was issued as a single reaching #40 C&W; the album was Tucker's lowest ranking up to that point at #44 on the C&W Albums chart.

== Track listing ==
No.	Title	Writer(s)	Length
1.	"You Are So Beautiful"	Billy Preston, Bruce Fisher	2:41
2.	"Best of My Love"	Don Henley, Glenn Frey, JD Souther	3:55
3.	"There Is a Place"	Sharon L. Rucker, Kinky Friedman	2:31
4.	"Can I Be Your Lady?"	David Allan Coe	2:40
5.	"Lovin' Arms"	Tom Jans	3:01
6.	"You Know Just What I'd Do"	Jerry Foster, Bill Rice	2:35
7.	"Almost Persuaded"	Billy Sherrill, Glenn Sutton	3:11
8.	"Spring"	John Tipton	3:53
9.	"Guess I'll Have to Love Him More"	Sherrill, Sutton	2:27
10.	"I Still Sing the Old Songs"	Coe	3:05
