= Greatest Hits (1974 Tanya Tucker album) =

Greatest hits album by Tanya Tucker
- Released: December 2, 1974
- Genre: Country
- Length: 28:42
- Label: Columbia
- Producer: Billy Sherrill

Tanya Tucker chronology
Would You Lay with Me (In a Field of Stone) (1974)	Greatest Hits (1974)	Tanya Tucker (1975)

Greatest Hits is the first compilation album by American country music artist Tanya Tucker. It was released on December 2, 1974 as her final album for Columbia Records, after this album's release, Tucker exited Columbia's roster in favor of MCA in 1975.

== Track listing ==
No.	Title	Writer(s)	Length
1.	"Delta Dawn"	Larry Collins, Alex Harvey	2:56
2.	"Blood Red and Goin' Down"	Curly Putman	3:02
3.	"The Jamestown Ferry"	Bobby Borchers, Mack Vickery	2:53
4.	"What's Your Mama's Name"	Dallas Frazier, Earl Montgomery	2:55
5.	"I Believe the South Is Gonna Rise Again"	Bobby Braddock	3:01
6.	"Would You Lay with Me (In a Field of Stone)"	David Allan Coe	2:23
7.	"Love's the Answer"	Emily Mitchell, Norro Wilson	2:34
8.	"Rainy Girl"	Tanya Tucker, Codye Hancock	2:29
9.	"No Man's Land"	Don Wayne	3:37
10.	"The Man That Turned My Mama On"	Ed Bruce	2:54

== Chart performance ==
Chart (1974)	Peak position
US Top Country Albums (Billboard)	18
