= Live from the Troubadour =

Live album by Tanya Tucker
- Released: October 16, 2020
- Recorded: October 16, 2019
- Venue: Troubadour (West Hollywood)
- Genre: Country
- Length: 61:25
- Label: Fantasy
- Producer: Tanya Tucker

Tanya Tucker chronology
While I'm Livin' (2019)	Live from the Troubadour (2020)	Sweet Western Sound (2023)

Singles from Live from the Troubadour
- 1. "Bring My Flowers Now" Released: December 13, 2019; 2. "I'm on Fire / Ring of Fire" Released: September 11, 2020; 3. "Delta Dawn" Released: October 2, 2020

Live from the Troubadour is the third live album by American country music singer Tanya Tucker. It was released on October 16, 2020, by Fantasy Records. The album was recorded on October 16, 2019, during the first night of Tucker's sold out two night engagement at the Troubadour to promote the release of her comeback album While I'm Livin'.

== Background ==
On July 8, 2019, Tucker announced three shows to celebrate the release of her new album, While I'm Livin'. The shows were August 22 at Nashville's Exit/In, September 17 at the Bowery Ballroom in New York, and October 16 at the Troubadour in Los Angeles. A second show at the Troubadour on October 17 was added on August 23. The first night at the Troubadour was recorded and highlights from the performance were broadcast by 88.5FM on December 13.

== Release and promotion ==
The first single from the album, "Bring My Flowers Now", was released on December 13, 2019.

The album was announced on September 11, 2020. The second single, "I'm on Fire / Ring of Fire", was released the same day along with the album's pre-order.

== Track listing ==
Live from the Troubadour track listing
No.	Title	Writer(s)	Length
1.	"Would You Lay with Me (In a Field of Stone)"	David Allan Coe	3:03
2.	"Jamestown Ferry"	Mack Vickery; Bobby Borchers	3:04
3.	"What's Your Mama's Name, Child"	Dallas Frazier; Earl Montgomery	3:05
4.	"Blood Red and Goin' Down"	Curly Putman	3:41
5.	"Strong Enough to Bend"	Beth Nielsen Chapman; Don Schlitz	3:29
6.	"I'm on Fire / Ring of Fire"	Bruce Springsteen; June Carter Cash; Merle Kilgore	3:50
7.	"Mustang Ridge"	Brandi Carlile; Tim Hanseroth; Phil Hanseroth	3:49
8.	"The Wheels of Laredo"	Carlile; T. Hanseroth; P. Hanseroth	4:03
9.	"I Don't Owe You Anything"	Carlile; T. Hanseroth; P. Hanseroth	3:44
10.	"High Ridin' Heroes"	David Lynn Jones	3:28
11.	"Hard Luck"	John C. "Pete" Bailey; David Lee Mitchell; Raymond L. Turner; Jerry Ontiberoz	3:37
12.	"Interlude"		0:46
13.	"Bring My Flowers Now"	Tanya Tucker; Carlile; T. Hanseroth; P. Hanseroth	4:14
14.	"Texas (When I Die)"	Ed Bruce; Patsy Bruce; Bobby Borchers	5:07
15.	"It's a Little Too Late"	Pat Terry; Roger Murrah	6:20
16.	"Delta Dawn"	Alex Harvey; Larry Collins	6:05
Total length:			61:25

== Personnel ==
Adapted from the album liner notes.

Performance

- Tanya Tucker – vocals
- Spencer Bartoletti – background vocals
- Jake Clayton – utility (fiddle, dobro, steel, harmony vocals)
- Andy Gibson – electric guitar
- Jefferson Jarvis – keyboards
- Shooter Jennings – keyboards on "High Ridin' Heroes"
- Mike Malinin – drums
- Brian Seligman – acoustic guitar
- Presley Tucker – backing vocals
- Dino Villanueva – bass guitar

Production

- Paul Blakemore – mastering
- Seth Presant – mixing
- Cory Stone – recording
- Tanya Tucker – producer

Other personnel

- Derrick Kupish – photography
- Carrie Smith – package design
