= A Memory Like I'm Gonna Be =

Single by Tanya Tucker

from the album Tanya
- Released: July 29, 2002
- Genre: Country
- Length: 3:10
- Label: Tuckertime/Capitol Nashville
- Songwriters: Roger Murrah, Jerry Laseter
- Producers: Barry Beckett, Jerry Laseter

Tanya Tucker singles chronology
"Ridin' Out the Heartache" (1997)	"A Memory Like I'm Gonna Be" (2002)	"Old Weakness (Coming On Strong)" (2003)

"A Memory Like I'm Gonna Be" is a song recorded by American country music artist Tanya Tucker. It was released in July 2002 as the first single from the album Tanya. The song reached #34 on the Billboard Hot Country Singles & Tracks chart. The song was written by Roger Murrah and Jerry Laseter.

== Content ==
Nashville-based songwriter Roger Murrah wrote the song with Tanya Tucker's then-fiancé, Jerry Laseter. Laseter also co-produced the song with Barry Beckett, and Tucker released it through her own Tuckertime label.

Lyrically, the song is a woman telling an ex-lover that she will be "hard to forget". Deborah Evans Price of Billboard wrote of the song that Tucker "exudes all the sass and personality that made her a star at 13...and has carried her through three decades of hits."

== Chart performance ==
Chart (2002)	Peak position
US Hot Country Songs (Billboard)	34
