= Spring (Tanya Tucker song) =

Single by Tanya Tucker

from the album You Are So Beautiful
- B-side: "Bed of Roses"
- Released: May 1975
- Recorded: 1974
- Studio: Columbia Studio
- Genre: Country pop
- Length: 3:53
- Label: Columbia
- Songwriter(s): John Tipton
- Producer(s): Billy Sherrill

Tanya Tucker singles chronology
| "Lizzie and the Rainman" (1975) | "Spring" (1975) | "San Antonio Stroll" (1975) |

"Spring" is a song written by John Tipton, recorded by American country music artist, Tanya Tucker. It was released in May 1975 and reached the top 20 of the American and Canadian country songs charts. It was among Tucker's final singles released by the Columbia label. It was the first single from her compilation album You Are Beautiful.

== Background and recording ==
Tanya Tucker was only 13 years old when she first broke through into country music with the top ten single, "Delta Dawn". Tucker's success continued with a series of number one singles, such as "What's Your Mama's Name" and "Blood Red and Goin' Down". Tucker moved to MCA Records in 1975 where she had another number one single with "Lizzie and the Rainman". Yet, Columbia continued issuing several more singles following her departure including "Spring". Composed by John Tipton, Tucker had originally recorded the track in 1974 at the Columbia Studio, located in Nashville, Tennessee. The session was produced by Billy Sherrill.

== Release, chart performance and reception ==
In May 1975, Columbia released "Spring" as a single. The track spent 15 weeks on the American Billboard Hot Country Songs chart. In August 1975, it reached the top 20, peaking at number 18 on the chart. On the Canadian RPM Country chart, the single reached a similar top 20 peak, climbing to number 11. The song was not included on album until the release of the 1977 Columbia Records compilation titled, You Are So Beautiful.

== Track listing ==
7" vinyl single

- "Spring" – 3:53
- "Bed of Roses" – 2:25

== Chart performance ==
| Chart (1975) | Peak position |
|---|---|
| Canada Country Singles (RPM) | 11 |
| US Hot Country Songs (Billboard) | 18 |
