= I Believe the South Is Gonna Rise Again =

Single by Tanya Tucker

from the album Would You Lay with Me (In a Field of Stone)
- B-side: "Old Man Tucker's Daughter"
- Released: December 1974
- Recorded: August – November 1973
- Studio: Columbia (Nashville, Tennessee)
- Genre: Country
- Length: 3:01
- Label: Columbia
- Songwriter(s): Bobby Braddock
- Producer(s): Billy Sherrill

Tanya Tucker singles chronology
"The Man That Turned My Mama On" (1974)	"I Believe the South Is Gonna Rise Again" (1974)	"Lizzie and the Rainman" (1975)

"I Believe the South Is Gonna Rise Again" is a song written by Bobby Braddock, and recorded by American country music artist, Tanya Tucker. It was released in December 1974 and reached the top 20 of the American country songs chart. It was the third and final single from Tucker's third studio album Would You Lay with Me (In a Field of Stone).

== Background and recording ==
At age 13, Tucker had found commercial success with the release of the top ten country single titled "Delta Dawn". She followed it with several number one singles including "What's Your Mama's Name" and "Blood Red and Goin' Down". Tucker cut her next single between August and November 1973 at the Columbia Studios in Nashville, Tennessee. The sessions for the song were produced by Billy Sherrill and it was written by Bobby Braddock.

== Release, chart performance and reception ==
"I Believe the South Is Gonna Rise Again" was first included as part of Tucker's third studio album, called Would You Lay with Me (In a Field of Stone). In December 1974, it was released as the final single from the album. The track spent 11 weeks on the American Billboard Hot Country Songs chart. In February 1975, it peaked at number 18 on the chart and became her first single to miss the top ten. On the Canadian RPM Country chart, the single was more commercially successful, peaking at number ten. The song received positive reception from critic Thom Jurek, who reviewed her third studio album for AllMusic. Jurek commented that she, "handles the lyrics and melodies with so much control and aplomb that it's difficult to believe how young she is here."

== Track listing ==
7" vinyl single

- "I Believe the South Is Gonna Rise Again" – 3:01
- "Old Man Tucker's Daughter" – 2:53

== Chart performance ==
Chart (1974–1975)	Peak position
Canada Country Singles (RPM)	10
US Hot Country Songs (Billboard)	18
