= Would You Lay with Me (In a Field of Stone) (song) =

Single by Tanya Tucker

from the album Would You Lay with Me (In a Field of Stone)
- B-side: "No Man's Land"
- Released: December 31, 1973
- Studio: Columbia (Nashville, Tennessee)
- Genre: Country
- Length: 2:23
- Label: Columbia
- Songwriter: David Allan Coe
- Producer: Billy Sherrill

Tanya Tucker singles chronology
| "Blood Red and Goin' Down" (1973) | "Would You Lay with Me (In a Field of Stone)" (1973) | "The Man That Turned My Mama On" (1974) |

"Would You Lay with Me (In a Field of Stone)" is a song written by David Allan Coe and recorded by American country music artist Tanya Tucker. It was released in December 1973 as the first single and title track from the album Would You Lay with Me (In a Field of Stone). It topped the U.S. country chart on March 30, 1974, for one week and was Tucker's third number-one song on the chart. On the Billboard Hot 100, the song peaked at number 46. Only her 1975 number-one country hit, "Lizzie and the Rainman", performed better on the pop chart.

== Background ==
John Lomax III stated that he was present when David Allen Coe heard the song If I Needed You by Townes Van Zandt and asked to use it. Van Zandt gave permission as long as he was credited as a writer, but instead Coe copied the subject matter and melody for "Would You Lay With Me" and did not credit Townes Van Zandt.

== Chart performance ==
| Chart (1973–1974) | Peak position |
|---|---|
| Australia (Kent Music Report) | 59 |
| US Hot Country Songs (Billboard) | 1 |
| US Billboard Hot 100 | 46 |
| Canadian RPM Country Tracks | 7 |
| Canadian RPM Top Singles | 54 |

== Cover versions ==
- David Allan Coe later recorded the song as the b-side to his 1975 single "You Never Even Called Me by My Name."
- In 1974, a version by veteran Australian singer Judy Stone reached into the top 5 of the Australia chart. It was the 32nd biggest selling single in Australia in 1974.
- Alf Robertson covered the song in 1978, in Swedish as "Jennifers frågor".
- Willie Nelson and Waylon Jennings recorded the song on their 1983 album, Take It to the Limit.
- In 2000, Johnny Cash covered the song on his album, American III: Solitary Man.
