= Dancing the Night Away (Tanya Tucker song) =

Single by Tanya Tucker

from the album Ridin' Rainbows
- B-side: "Let's Keep It That Way"
- Released: August 1977
- Recorded: September 1976
- Studio: Soundshop Studio
- Genre: Country
- Length: 3:31
- Label: MCA
- Songwriter(s): James H. Brown Jr.; Russell Smith
- Producer(s): Jerry Crutchfield

Tanya Tucker singles chronology
"You Are So Beautiful" (1977)	"Dancing the Night Away" (1977)	"Save Me" (1978)

"Dancing the Night Away" is a song written by James H. Brown Jr. and Russell Smith, and recorded by American country music artist Tanya Tucker. It was released in August 1977 and became a top 20 single on both the American and Canadian country song charts in 1977. The song was the third single from Tucker's album Ridin' Rainbows.

== Background and recording ==
Tanya Tucker became a country music star at age 13 with her 1972 single, "Delta Dawn". The song became a top ten release and was followed by a series of number one singles such as "What's Your Mama's Name" and "Blood Red and Goin' Down". Tucker moved from Columbia Records to MCA Records in 1975 and she continued having a string of number one and top ten singles. Among her singles released from MCA was the track "Dancing the Night Away". The song was composed by James H. Brown Jr. and Russell Smith. Tucker first recorded the song at the Soundshop Studio in September 1976. The session was held in Nashville, Tennessee and was produced by Jerry Crutchfield.

== Release and chart performance ==
"Dancing the Night Away" first appeared on Tucker's 1976 studio album called Ridin' Rainbows. It was spawned as the album's fourth single in August 1977 via MCA Records. The track spent 11 weeks on the American Billboard Hot Country Songs chart. By September 1977, the song reached number 16 on the chart. On the Canadian RPM Country chart, the single reached a similar top 20 chart position, climbing to number 19. The song was later recorded by Crystal Gayle for her 1979 album, Miss the Mississippi.

== Track listing ==
7" vinyl single

- "Dancing the Night Away" – 3:31
- "Let's Keep It That Way" – 3:52

== Chart performance ==
Chart (1977)	Peak position
Canada Country Singles (RPM)	19
US Hot Country Songs (Billboard)	16
