= Ridin' Rainbows (song) =

Single by Tanya Tucker

from the album Ridin' Rainbows
- B-side: "Short Cut"
- Released: December 1976
- Recorded: March 1976
- Studio: Soundshop Studio
- Genre: Country
- Length: 2:40
- Label: MCA
- Songwriter(s): Jan Crutchfield; Connie Etheridge; Susan Pugh
- Producer(s): Jerry Crutchfield

Tanya Tucker singles chronology
"A Rock 'n' Roll Girl from Alaska" (1976)	"Ridin' Rainbows" (1976)	"It's a Cowboy Lovin' Night" (1977)

"Ridin' Rainbows" is a song written by Jan Crutchfield, Connie Etheridge and Susan Pugh, and recorded by American country music artist Tanya Tucker. It was released in December 1976. It became a top 20 single on the American country songs chart and a top ten single on the Canadian country songs chart in 1977. The song was the first single and title track from Tucker's album Ridin' Rainbows.

== Background and recording ==
Tanya Tucker became a commercially-successful country artist as a teenager when her single, "Delta Dawn", reached the top ten in 1972. She followed with several number one singles over the next several years including "What's Your Mama's Name" and "San Antonio Stroll". Tucker had moved from Columbia Records to MCA Records in 1975 where she continued having commercial success. Among her singles released from MCA was the 1977 track titled "Ridin' Rainbows". The song was composed by Jan Crutchfield, Connie Etheridge and Susan Pugh. Tucker cut the track alongside producer Jerry Crutchfield in March 1976 at the Soundshop Studio in Nashville, Tennessee.

== Release and chart performance ==
"Ridin' Rainbows" first appeared as the title track to Tucker's 1976 album of the same. It was spawned as the album's third single in December 1976 via MCA Records. The track spent 12 weeks on the American Billboard Hot Country Songs chart. In February 1977, the song reached the top 20, climbing to the number 12 position. On the Canadian RPM Country chart, the single became even more successful, reaching number seven.

== Track listing ==
7" vinyl single

- "Ridin' Rainbows" – 2:40
- "Short Cut" – 3:17

== Chart performance ==
Chart (1976–1977)	Peak position
Canada Country Singles (RPM)	7
US Hot Country Songs (Billboard)	12
