= Little Things (Tanya Tucker song) =

Single by Tanya Tucker

from the album Complicated
- B-side: "Two Sparrows in a Hurricane"
- Released: February 24, 1997
- Genre: Country
- Length: 4:03
- Label: Capitol Nashville
- Songwriters: Michael Dulaney, Steven Dale Jones
- Producer: Gregg Brown

Tanya Tucker singles chronology
"Find Out What's Happenin'" (1995)	"Little Things" (1997)	"Ridin' Out the Heartache" (1997)

"Little Things" is a song written by Michael Dulaney and Steven Dale Jones, and recorded by American country music artist Tanya Tucker. It was released in February 1997 as the first single from the album Complicated. The song reached number 9 on the Billboard Hot Country Singles & Tracks chart, becoming her last Top 10 hit.

== Music video ==
The music video was directed by Gerry Wenner and premiered in early 1997.

== Chart performance ==
"Little Things" debuted at number 64 on the U.S. Billboard Hot Country Singles & Tracks for the week of March 1, 1997.

Chart (1997)	Peak position
Canada Country Singles (RPM)	8
US Bubbling Under Hot 100 (Billboard)	14
US Hot Country Songs (Billboard)	9

=== Year-end charts ===
Chart (1997)	Position
Canada Country Tracks (RPM)	71
US Country Songs (Billboard)	70
