= My Turn (Tanya Tucker album) =

Studio album by Tanya Tucker
- Released: June 30, 2009
- Genre: Country
- Length: 33:50
- Label: Saguaro Road
- Producer: Pete Anderson; Jerry Laseter

Tanya Tucker chronology
Tanya (2002)	My Turn (2009)	While I'm Livin' (2019)

Singles from My Turn
- 1. "Love's Gonna Live Here" Released: April 28, 2009

My Turn is the 25th studio album by American country music artist Tanya Tucker. The album was released June 30, 2009. It is her first studio album since Tanya in 2002. My Turn consists of cover versions of country music standards, including the lead single, "Love's Gonna Live Here", "Lovesick Blues", and "Crazy Arms".

== Content ==
My Turn consists of 12 cover versions of country music standards that were originally recorded entirely by male artists. Tucker stated that she recorded the album to dedicate to her father, Beau Tucker, stating:

I picked the songs my daddy (Beau Tucker) always wanted me to sing," explained Tucker of the My Turn project. "This is really a tribute to him, because he was with me throughout my entire career. He's now with God above but I know he's watching over me still and loving these songs and this record.

== Critical reception ==
Professional ratings
Review scores
Source	Rating
Allmusic	4.5/5 stars
The Boston Globe	(favorable)
Country Weekly	(average)
No Depression	(average)
PopMatters	6/10 stars
Robert Christgau	(3-star Honorable Mention)
Engine 145	4/5 stars

Allmusic critic Stephen Thomas Erlewine gave the album four and a half out of five stars. Erlewine critiqued Tucker's way of blending each song, stating, "Tucker isn't quite gender-bending the way Lyle Lovett did when he sang "Stand by Your Man," but rather taking these songs directly, sounding as tough as any guy as she saunters her way through "Crazy Arms" and "Lovesick Blues." Erlewine also said that, "Pete Anderson's dry, unadorned production gives this muscle and grit, perhaps the most sympathetic setting Tucker has had in decades, the triumph is all Tanya's, as she digs deep into these songs, finding new meaning within them and proving that a great covers album need not reinterpret the sound of a song in order to reinvent it."

Blake Boldt of Roughstock.com also reviewed the release, and praised the album, stating how Tucker was not just remaking Country music songs like other artists had previously done before, but instead renewing each of them. Boldt also gave positive comments to Tucker's voice, saying, "Now 50, Tucker's vocal stylings remain as provocative as her well-documented wild-child past; her instantly-recognizable drawl is one of country's greatest voices ever, and every knotty note is chock full of hearty twang."

== Track listing ==
No.	Title	Writer(s)	Original artist	Length
1.	"Wine Me Up"	Bill Deaton, Faron Young	Faron Young	2:38
2.	"Lovesick Blues"	Cliff Friend, Irving Mills	Emmett Miller	2:49
3.	"Love's Gonna Live Here" (with Jim Lauderdale)	Buck Owens	Buck Owens	2:26
4.	"Crazy Arms"	Ralph Mooney, Charles "Chuck" Seals	Ray Price	2:49
5.	"After the Fire Is Gone"	L.E. White	Loretta Lynn and Conway Twitty	2:38
6.	"Is Anybody Goin' to San Antone"	Dave Kirby, Glenn Martin	Charley Pride	2:37
7.	"I Love You a Thousand Ways"	Jim Beck, Lefty Frizzell	Lefty Frizzell	2:38
8.	"Big, Big Love"	Ray Carroll, Wynn Stewart	Wynn Stewart	2:58
9.	"Walk Through This World with Me"	Sandy Seamons, Katy Savage	George Jones	2:38
10.	"Oh Lonesome Me"	Don Gibson	Don Gibson	2:41
11.	"You Don't Know Me"	Cindy Walker	Eddy Arnold	2:38
12.	"Ramblin' Fever"	Merle Haggard	Merle Haggard	4:20

== Personnel ==
=== Musicians ===
- Tanya Tucker – lead vocals
- Pete Anderson – bass guitar, acoustic guitar, electric guitar, harmonica, mandola, percussion, string arrangements
- Bob "Boo" Bernstein – steel guitar
- Tim Godwin – acoustic guitar
- Flaco Jiménez – accordion
- Jerry Laseter – electric guitar
- Jim Lauderdale – duet vocals on "Love's Gonna Live Here"
- Mike Murphy – string arrangements, strings
- Don Reed – fiddle, strings
- Kevin Sepriano – acoustic guitar
- Jo-El Sonnier – accordion
- Darrin Vincent – backing vocals
- Rhonda Vincent – backing vocals
- Peter Gayle Williams – drums

=== Technical ===
- Pete Anderson – producer
- Sally Brodwer – engineer
- Doug Deveraux – engineer
- Kevin Hare – engineer
- Mike Jason – executive producer
- Keith Krouse – engineer
- Jerry Laseter – producer
- Mike Lattrell – engineer
- Tony Rambo – engineer

== Chart performance ==
Chart (2009)	Peak position
U.S. Billboard Top Country Albums	27
U.S. Billboard 200	183
