= Don't Believe My Heart Can Stand Another You =

- German release picture sleeve

Single by Tanya Tucker

from the album Lovin' and Learnin'
- B-side: "Depend on You"
- Released: November 1975
- Genre: Country
- Length: 2:51
- Label: MCA
- Songwriter(s): Billy Ray Reynolds
- Producer(s): Jerry Crutchfield

Tanya Tucker singles chronology
"Greener Than the Grass (We Laid On)" (1975)	"Don't Believe My Heart Can Stand Another You" (1975)	"You've Got Me to Hold On To" (1976)

"Don't Believe My Heart Can't Stand Another You" is a song written Billy Ray Reynolds, and recorded by American country music artist Tanya Tucker. It was released in November 1975 as the first single from her album Lovin' and Learnin'. The song peaked at number 4 on the Billboard Hot Country Singles chart. It also reached number 1 on the RPM Country Tracks chart in Canada.

== Chart performance ==
Chart (1975–1976)	Peak position
US Hot Country Songs (Billboard)	4
Canadian RPM Country Tracks	1
