= Greener Than the Grass (We Laid On) =

Single by Tanya Tucker
- B-side: "Guess I'll Have to Love Him More"
- Released: October 1975
- Recorded: 1974
- Studio: Columbia Studio
- Genre: Country
- Length: 2:50
- Label: Columbia
- Songwriter(s): David Allan Coe
- Producer(s): Billy Sherrill

Tanya Tucker singles chronology
"Travelling Salesman" (1975)	"Greener Than the Grass (We Laid On)" (1975)	"Don't Believe My Heart Can Stand Another You" (1975)

"Greener Than the Grass (We Laid On)" is a song written by David Allan Coe, and recorded by American country music artist, Tanya Tucker. It was released in October 1975 and reached positions on the North American country songs charts. It was among Tucker's final singles released by the Columbia label.

== Background and recording ==
At age 13, Tanya Tucker broke into the country music field with the top ten single "Delta Dawn". It was followed by a series of number one singles on the country charts including "What's Your Mama's Name" and "Blood Red and Goin' Down". In 1975, Tucker moved from Columbia to MCA Records, where she continued having commercial success despite being a teenager. Yet, Columbia continued issuing several more singles following her departure including "Greener Than the Grass (We Lad On)". Composed by David Allan Coe, Tucker had originally recorded the track in 1974 at the Columbia Studio, located in Nashville, Tennessee. The session was produced by Billy Sherrill.

== Release, chart performance and reception ==
Columbia Records released "Greener Than the Grass (We Laid On)" as a single in October 1975. The track spent ten weeks on the American Billboard Hot Country Songs chart. It reached number 23 on the chart by December 1975, becoming her first single to miss the top 20. On the Canadian RPM Country chart, the single peaked at number 20.

== Track listing ==
7" vinyl single

- "Greener Than the Grass (We Laid On)" – 2:50
- "Guess I'll Have to Love Him More" – 2:27

== Chart performance ==
Chart (1975)	Peak position
Canada Country Singles (RPM)	20
US Hot Country Songs (Billboard)	23
