= While I'm Livin' =

Studio album by Tanya Tucker
- Released: August 23, 2019
- Recorded: January 2019
- Studio: Sunset Sound (Los Angeles)
- Genre: Country
- Length: 34:48
- Label: Fantasy
- Producers: Brandi Carlile; Shooter Jennings

Tanya Tucker chronology
My Turn (2009)	While I'm Livin' (2019)	Live from the Troubadour (2020)

Singles from While I'm Livin'
- 1. "The Wheels of Laredo" Released: June 5, 2019; 2. "Hard Luck" Released: June 28, 2019; 3. "The House That Built Me" Released: August 2, 2019; 4. "Bring My Flowers Now" Released: August 16, 2019; 5. "The Winner's Game" Released: November 25, 2019; 6. "Pack Your Lies and Go" Released: November 6, 2020

While I'm Livin' is the 26th studio album by American country music singer-songwriter Tanya Tucker. It was released on August 23, 2019, by Fantasy Records. The album was produced by Brandi Carlile and Shooter Jennings. It is Tucker's first album in a decade, since 2009's My Turn, and her first album of original material since her 2002 album, Tanya. The album earned Tucker the Grammy Award for Best Country Album at the 62nd Annual Grammy Awards in addition to winning Best Country Song for "Bring My Flowers Now" which was also nominated for Best Country Solo Performance, and the all-genre Grammy Award for Song of the Year. Rolling Stone placed the album at number one on the publication's list of the 40 Best Country and Americana Albums of 2019 and number 24 on their list of the top 50 Albums of 2019. Tucker promoted the album throughout 2019 with the While I'm Livin' Tour and continued to support the album in the first quarter of 2020 on the Bring My Flowers Now Tour, a partnership with CMT's Next Women of Country. The COVID-19 pandemic caused the remainder of the tour to be postponed until July 2021.

== Background ==
After Tucker's 2002 album, Tanya, barely broke the top 40 of the country albums chart, she began to retreat from the spotlight. Since 2002, Tucker has only released one studio album, 2009's My Turn, an album of covers of songs by male country stars she listened to growing up, which was a disaster by Tucker's standards. She later recalled to Entertainment Weekly that "It should have been called My Sh—y Turn. They didn't use the final vocals I made. I had no control." After the release of My Turn, Tucker had more personal and pressing issues to deal with. She began to experience health problems from the chronic fatigue disease Epstein-barr. Both of her parents died, her father in 2006 and mother in 2012, leaving her emotionally drained and without management. Tucker's father had been her manager since the beginning of her career. Tucker recalled this time in her life, saying, "I quit touring. I didn't have a band. I went out to Malibu and sat in the sun and spent a lot of money."

Once Tucker decided to come back to the spotlight, she went to various labels only to find that there was little interest. For a while, Shooter Jennings (son of Waylon Jennings) had been casually speaking with her about the possibility of him producing her new album. Plans for a new album really began to speed up once Jennings mentioned to friend and avid Tucker fan Brandi Carlile that he would like for her to write a new song for the album. Carlile and her long-time collaborators, Phil and Tim Hanseroth, wrote nearly an entire album's worth of material. Jennings told Carlile that since she was such a big Tanya fan, she should co-produce the album with him. Tucker recalled that she was hesitant about recording the album at first, saying, "I didn’t know if the songs were strong enough."

The album was recorded over three weeks in January 2019, at Sunset Sound in Los Angeles. Tucker stated in an interview on Acoustic Café that "High Ridin' Heroes" was the first song recorded for the album. Tucker recorded a cover of Dennis Quaid and the Sharks' "On My Way to Heaven" for the album, featuring Quaid and Kris Kristofferson on backing vocals, but it was not included on the album's final track listing.

== Release and promotion ==
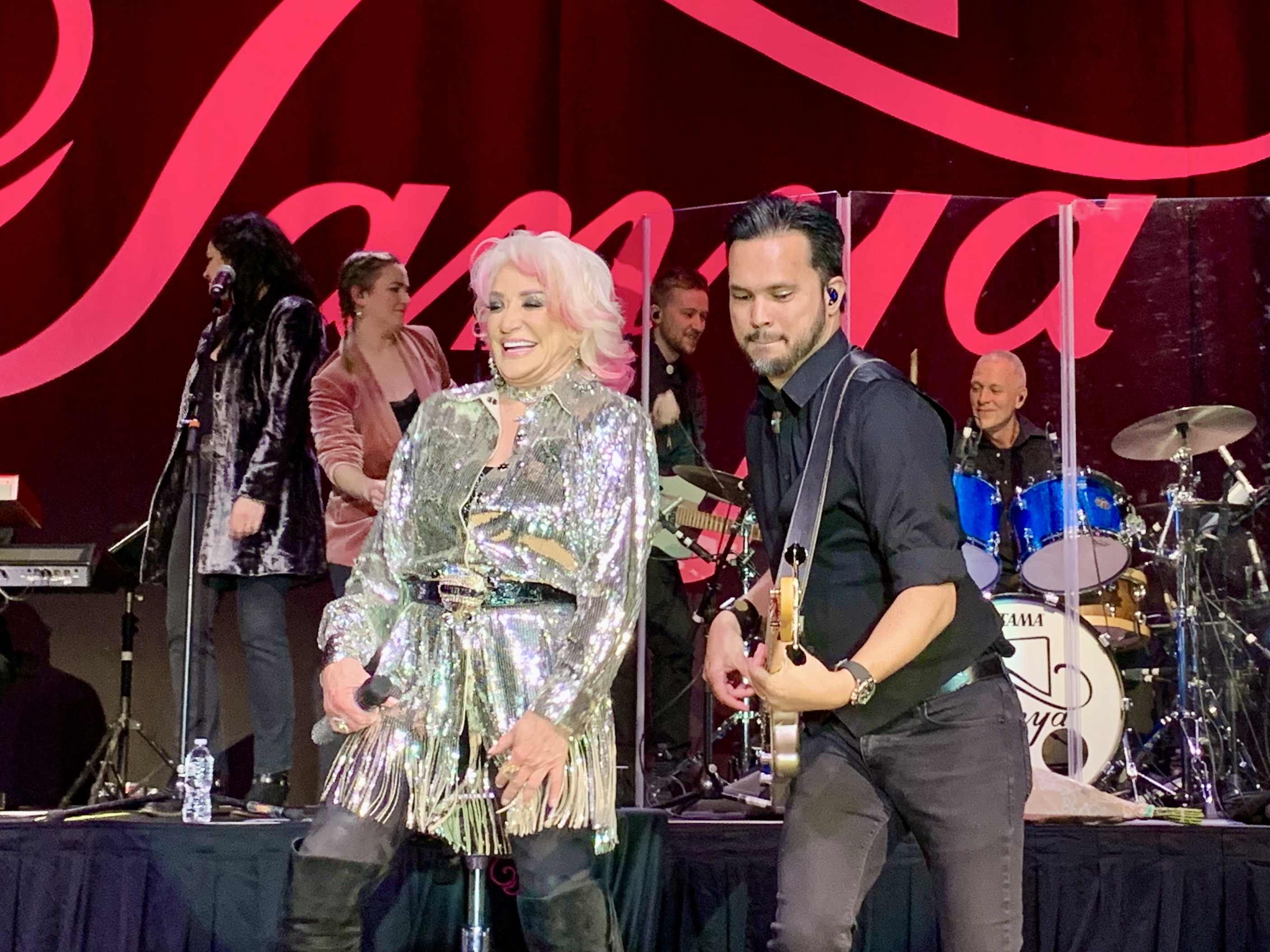
Tucker performing during the Bring My Flowers Now Tour at Graceland in 2020.

On April 1, 2019, Tucker and Carlile performed "Bring My Flowers Now" at Loretta Lynn's All-Star Birthday Celebration Concert at the Bridgestone Arena in Nashville.

The album was officially announced on June 5, 2019. The album's first single, "The Wheels of Laredo" was released with the album's preorder the same day, as well as its music video. Also on June 5, Tucker and Carlile performed "Delta Dawn" at the 2019 CMT Music Awards, where they were joined by Martina McBride, Trisha Yearwood, Deana Carter, Lauren Alaina, RaeLynn and Carly Pearce.

The album's second single, "Hard Luck", was released on June 28, along with its accompanying music video which features guest appearances from the album's producers, Brandi Carlile and Shooter Jennings.

The third single, a cover of Miranda Lambert's "The House That Built Me", was released on August 2 and its music video was released on August 26.

The album's fourth single, "Bring My Flowers Now", was released on August 16. The song's music video premiered on October 22.

"The Winner's Game" was released as the fifth single from the album on November 25. It had previously only been available with the album through Tucker's online store on a bonus lathe cut vinyl featuring the song and a personalized message, which was limited to 50 copies.

A live version of "Bring My Flowers Now" was released on December 13. It was recorded during a sold-out show at the Troubadour in Los Angeles on October 16. It was followed by the release Live from the Troubadour on October 16, 2020, a live album consisting of Tucker's full set from the show.

"Pack Your Lies and Go" was released as the album's sixth single on November 6, 2020. It had previously been released as a bonus track on the Target exclusive version of the album.

== Content ==
The majority of the album was written by Brandi Carlile and twin brothers Tim and Phil Hanseroth. The trio wrote seven of the album's ten tracks. The remaining three songs are covers.

The album opens with "Mustang Ridge", described by Rolling Stone as the album's "sing-a-long mission statement," it contains references to locations in Tucker's native Texas: Mustang Ridge and San Antonio's Hays Street Bridge. The second track, "The Wheels of Laredo", is described by Taste of Country as a "throbbing ballad that appears to acutely point at the contradictions inherent in the illegal immigration debate." "I Don’t Owe You Anything", the third track, is a "sassy kiss-off from a middle-aged mother who’s had enough," sung over a down-home acoustic arrangement. The album's fourth track, "The Day My Heart Goes Still", is a tribute to Tucker's father and manager, Beau, who died in 2006. Track five, "High Ridin’ Heroes", is a cover of a song written by David Lynn Jones in 1987 and originally recorded by Jones as a duet with Waylon Jennings.

The sixth track is a cover of Miranda Lambert’s 2010 hit, "The House That Built Me", which was written by Tom Douglas and Allen Shamblin. Tucker’s version transforms the song into a "deeply moving account of a parent who is searching for meaning in their life after the children have left behind a house whose emptiness becomes too much to bear." The seventh track on the album, "Hard Luck", is another cover. It was written by John C. Bailey, David Lee Mitchell, Raymond L. Turner, and Jerry Ontiberoz, and originally recorded in 1979 by Texas proto-metal band Josefus. In Tucker's hands the song becomes "an outlaw anthem of survival." The track features group background vocals from a number of people; including actor Dennis Quaid; Tucker's son, Grayson; and his father, Ben Reed. On the album's eighth track, "Rich", Tucker recalls the lean years spent traveling with her dad, which plays like her own version of Dolly Parton’s "Coat of Many Colors". Rolling Stone compared "Seminole Wind Calling", the album's ninth track, to Tucker's 1972 debut single, "Delta Dawn", saying that it "conjures the country-gospel of her breakthrough debut." The album closes with "Bring My Flowers Now", which was written by Tucker with Carlile and the Hanseroth brothers. The tender ballad is a reminder "to show appreciation for those we cherish while we still have that opportunity."

== Critical reception ==
Professional ratings
Aggregate scores
Source	Rating
Metacritic	83/100
Review scores
Source	Rating
AllMusic	4.5/5 stars
Exclaim!	9/10
Mojo	3 stars
Rolling Stone	4/5 stars

The album received universal acclaim from music critics. At Metacritic, which assigns a normalized rating out of 100 to reviews from mainstream publications, the album received a weighted average score of 83 based on 7 reviews.

Thierry Côté from Exclaim! gave the album a score of nine out of ten and said that the album "is perhaps the finest full-length in Tucker's storied five-decade career." In a positive review for Variety, A.D. Amorosi praised Carlile and the Hanseroth's "intuitive songwriting" and said that Tucker "proudly inhabits their biographical approximation of her nine lives with earnestness and ease." Jonathan Bernstein from Rolling Stone gave the album four out of five stars, praising the album's song selection and said that Tucker "never succumbs to old-age weariness." In a review for AllMusic, Stephen Thomas Erlewine gave the album four out of five stars. He felt that Tucker's covers of "Hard Luck" and "The House That Built Me" "add texture and deepen the emotional undercurrents flowing through the record." He went on to say that when the covers are combined with the original songs "these tunes paint a portrait of a mighty artist who has been through a lot but is fearless about the future." In a mixed review for Mojo, Fred Dellar said, "Tucker has created an album that should endear her to those who still raise the outlaw flag while also appealing to hard-edged pop-tinged rock believers."

== Accolades ==
=== Awards ===
Tucker received four nominations at the 62nd Annual Grammy Awards, the most of any country performer. The album won Best Country Album and "Bring My Flowers Now" won Best Country Song while also being nominated for Best Country Solo Performance and the all genre award for Song of the Year. The album was also nominated for Album of the Year at the 2020 Americana Music Honors & Awards and "Bring My Flowers Now" was nominated for Song of the Year. "Bring My Flowers Now" was also nominated for Video of the Year at the CMT Music Awards. It was in the first round of 14 CMT Video of the Year nominees and then fans voted the video into the final three nominees for Video of the Year

Award	Year	Category	Nominee/work	Result
Grammy Awards	2020	Best Country Album	While I'm Livin'	Won
Grammy Awards	2020	Song of the Year	"Bring My Flowers Now"	Nominated
Grammy Awards	2020	Best Country Solo Performance	"Bring My Flowers Now"	Nominated
Grammy Awards	2020	Best Country Song	"Bring My Flowers Now"	Won
Americana Music Honors & Awards	2020	Album of the Year	While I'm Livin'	Nominated
Americana Music Honors & Awards	2020	Song of the Year	"Bring My Flowers Now"	Nominated
CMT Music Awards	2020	Video of the Year	"Bring My Flowers Now"	Nominated

=== Year-end lists ===
The album also appeared on numerous year-end lists. Rolling Stone placed the album at number one on their 40 Best Country and Americana Albums of 2019 list and number 24 on their 50 Best Albums of 2019 list. Rolling Stone also placed "Bring My Flowers Now" at number three on their list of the 25 Best Country and Americana Songs of 2019. The Boot ranked the album at number two on their Top 10 Country and Americana Albums list. The album appeared at number eight on Exclaim!'s 10 Best Folk and Country Albums of 2019 list. NPR placed the album at number 24 on their list of the Best Albums of 2019 and placed Tucker's cover of "The House That Built Me" at number one on their Best Cover Songs of 2019 list. Stereogum ranked the album at number four on their list of the 10 Best Country Albums of 2019. The album appeared at number five on Paste magazine's list of the 20 Best Country and Americana Albums of 2019.

Year-end lists
Publication	Work	List	Rank	Ref.
The Boot	While I'm Livin'	Top 10 Country and Americana Albums	2	
Dallas Voice	While I'm Livin'	Best Albums of 2019	5	
Exclaim!	While I'm Livin'	10 Best Folk and Country Albums of 2019	8	
Garden & Gun	While I'm Livin'	The Best Southern Albums of 2019	20	
The Guardian	"The House That Built Me"	The Best Songs of 2019...That You Didn't Hear	—N/a	
No Depression	While I'm Livin'	Readers’ 50 Favorite Roots Music Albums of 2019	26	
NPR	While I'm Livin'	Best Albums of 2019	24	
NPR	"The House That Built Me"	Best Cover Songs of 2019	1	
Paste	While I'm Livin'	The 20 Best Country and Americana Albums of 2019	5	
PopMatters	While I'm Livin'	The 10 Best Country Albums of 2019	4	
Rolling Stone	While I'm Livin'	40 Best Country and Americana Albums of 2019	1	
Rolling Stone	While I'm Livin'	50 Best Albums of 2019	24	
Rolling Stone	"Bring My Flowers Now"	25 Best Country and Americana Songs of 2019	3	
Rolling Stone	"Hard Luck" (Music Video)	10 Best Country Music Videos of 2019	—N/a	
Stereogum	While I'm Livin'	The 10 Best Country Albums of 2019	4	
Taste of Country	While I'm Livin'	10 Best Country Albums of 2019	4	
Uproxx	While I'm Livin'	The 2019 Uproxx Music Critics Poll	46	
Wide Open Country	While I'm Livin'	The 20 Best Country Albums of 2019	—N/a	

=== Decade-end lists ===
Decade-end lists
Publication	Work	List	Rank	Ref.
Billboard	While I'm Livin'	The 25 Best Country Albums of the 2010s	21	
Billboard	"Bring My Flowers Now"	The 35 Best Country Songs of the 2010s	27	

== Commercial performance ==
The album debuted at number eight on the Billboard Top Country Albums chart, selling 10,000 units in its first week of release, almost all in traditional album sales. The album also debuted at number two on the Billboard Folk Albums chart and number 68 on the Billboard 200. The album saw success internationally as well, peaking at number two on the UK Country Albums chart and number 60 on the Scottish Albums chart.

The album has sold 44,200 copies in the United States as of March 9, 2020.

== Track listing ==
All tracks written by Brandi Carlile, Tim Hanseroth and Phil Hanseroth, except where noted.

No.	Title	Writer(s)	Length
1.	"Mustang Ridge"		3:37
2.	"The Wheels of Laredo"		3:49
3.	"I Don't Owe You Anything"		2:34
4.	"The Day My Heart Goes Still"		3:19
5.	"High Ridin' Heroes"	David Lynn Jones	3:27
6.	"The House That Built Me"	Tom Douglas; Allen Shamblin	4:12
7.	"Hard Luck"	John C. "Pete" Bailey; David Lee Mitchell; Raymond L. Turner; Jerry Ontiberoz	3:22
8.	"Rich"		2:33
9.	"Seminole Wind Calling"		3:35
10.	"Bring My Flowers Now"	Tanya Tucker; Carlile; T. Hanseroth; P. Hanseroth	4:20
Total length:			34:48

Target edition bonus tracks
No.	Title	Writer(s)	Length
11.	"Delta Dawn"	Alex Harvey; Larry Collins	3:33
12.	"Pack Your Lies and Go"	Alan Syms	2:54
Total length:			41:15

Bonus personalized 12" picture disc vinyl
No.	Title	Writer(s)	Length
1.	"Personalized message"		0:16
2.	"The Winner's Game"		3:33
Total length:			3:49

== Personnel ==
Adapted from the album liner notes.

- Brandi Carlile – producer, background vocals, acoustic guitar, group vocals on "Hard Luck", piano
- Danny Clinch – back cover photo, interior photos
- James Garner – A&R, group vocals on "Hard Luck"
- Nate Haessly – assistant engineer
- Phil Hanseroth – background vocals, bass, banjo, claps
- Tim Hanseroth – acoustic guitar, background vocals, banjo, claps
- Rich Hinman – pedal steel
- Norm Howell – group vocals on "Hard Luck"
- Tricia Howell – group vocals on "Hard Luck"
- Shooter Jennings – producer, engineer, piano, organ, Wurlitzer, synthesizers
- Ted Russell Kamp – bass, standup bass
- Pete Lyman – mastering
- Steven Lyon – cover photo
- Chris Masterson – acoustic guitar, baritone guitar, electric guitar, tambo, mando guitar, 12 string guitar, claps
- Josh Neumann – cello
- Chris Powell – drums, claps
- Dennis Quaid – group vocals on "Hard Luck"
- Mark Rains – engineer
- Ben Reed – group vocals on "Hard Luck"
- Jerilyn Sawyer – A&R, group vocals on "Hard Luck"
- Trina Shoemaker – mixing, shaker(s)
- Carrie Smith – art direction, design
- David Spreng – additional mix editing
- Grayson Tucker – group vocals on "Hard Luck"
- Tanya Tucker – vocals
- Eleanor Whitmore – mandolin, tenor guitar
- Nathan Yaccino – additional engineering
- Jim Zumwait – group vocals on "Hard Luck"

== Charts ==
Chart (2019)	Peak position
Scottish Albums (Official Charts)	60
UK Country Albums (Official Charts)	2
US Billboard 200	68
US Digital Albums (Billboard)	12
US Americana/Folk Albums (Billboard)	2
US Top Album Sales (Billboard)	7
US Top Country Albums (Billboard)	8
US Vinyl Albums (Billboard)	11
