= Here's Some Love (song) =

Single by Tanya Tucker

from the album Here's Some Love
- B-side: "Pride of Franklin County"
- Released: June 7, 1976
- Genre: Country, country rock
- Length: 2:59
- Label: MCA
- Songwriter(s): Richard Mainegra; Jack Roberts
- Producer(s): Jerry Crutchfield

Tanya Tucker singles chronology
| "You've Got Me to Hold On To" (1976) | "Here's Some Love" (1976) | "Ridin' Rainbows" (1977) |

"Here's Some Love" is a song written by Richard Mainegra and Jack Roberts, and recorded by American country music artist Tanya Tucker. It was released in June 1976 as the first single and title track from the album Here's Some Love.

== Chart performance ==
The single was Tucker's sixth number one on the country chart. "Here's Some Love" peaked on the Hot 100 at number eighty-two and went to number twenty-five on the Adult Contemporary chart.

=== Weekly charts ===
| Chart (1976) | Peak position |
|---|---|
| US Billboard Hot 100 | 82 |
| US Hot Country Songs (Billboard) | 1 |
| US Adult Contemporary (Billboard) | 25 |
| Canadian RPM Top Singles | 91 |
| Canadian RPM Country Tracks | 2 |
| Canadian RPM Adult Contemporary | 33 |

=== Year-end charts ===
| Chart (1976) | Position |
|---|---|
| US Hot Country Songs (Billboard) | 25 |
