= You've Got Me to Hold On To =

- Japanese release picture sleeve

Single by Tanya Tucker

from the album Lovin' and Learnin'
- B-side: "Ain't That a Shame"
- Released: April 17, 1976
- Genre: Country
- Length: 3:05
- Label: MCA
- Songwriter(s): Dave Loggins
- Producer(s): Jerry Crutchfield

Tanya Tucker singles chronology
"Don't Believe My Heart Can Stand Another You" (1975)	"You've Got Me to Hold On To" (1976)	"Here's Some Love" (1976)

"You've Got Me to Hold On To" is a song written by Dave Loggins, and recorded by American country music artist Tanya Tucker. It was released in April 1976 as the second single from the album Lovin' and Learnin'. The song reached number 3 on the Billboard Hot Country Singles & Tracks chart.

== Charts ==
=== Weekly charts ===
Chart (1976)	Peak position
US Hot Country Songs (Billboard)	3
Canadian RPM Country Tracks	3

=== Year-end charts ===
Chart (1976)	Position
US Hot Country Songs (Billboard)	48
