= The Man That Turned My Mama On =

Single by Tanya Tucker

from the album Would You Lay with Me (In a Field of Stone)
- B-side: "Satisfied with Missing You"
- Released: June 8, 1974
- Studio: Columbia (Nashville, Tennessee)
- Genre: Country
- Length: 3:05
- Label: Columbia
- Songwriter(s): Ed Bruce
- Producer(s): Billy Sherrill

Tanya Tucker singles chronology
"Would You Lay with Me (In a Field of Stone)" (1974)	"The Man That Turned My Mama On" (1974)	"I Believe the South Is Gonna Rise Again" (1974)

"The Man That Turned My Mama On" is a song written by Ed Bruce, and recorded by American country music artist Tanya Tucker. It was released in June 1974 as the second single from the album Would You Lay with Me (In a Field of Stone). The song reached #4 on the Billboard Hot Country Singles & Tracks chart.

== Content ==
The song speaks of the narrator's wish that she could have known more about her father, a traveling salesman who met her mother and quickly married her (the lyrics indicate that the quick marriage was more of an elopement than a shotgun marriage, since "Grandma Kate" – the narrator's grandmother who raised her mother to be a proper lady – likely would not have approved of the relationship).

Unlike other songs where the father is absent due to abandonment, in this song the father died of illness when she was only five.

== Chart performance ==
Chart (1974)	Peak position
US Hot Country Songs (Billboard)	4
US Billboard Hot 100	86
Canadian RPM Country Tracks	10

== Other versions ==
Songwriter Ed Bruce recorded the song for his own 1978 album "Cowboys and Dreamers"; released as a single, it made number 70 on the country charts.
