= La Costa =

American country music artist (born 1951)

LaCosta Tucker
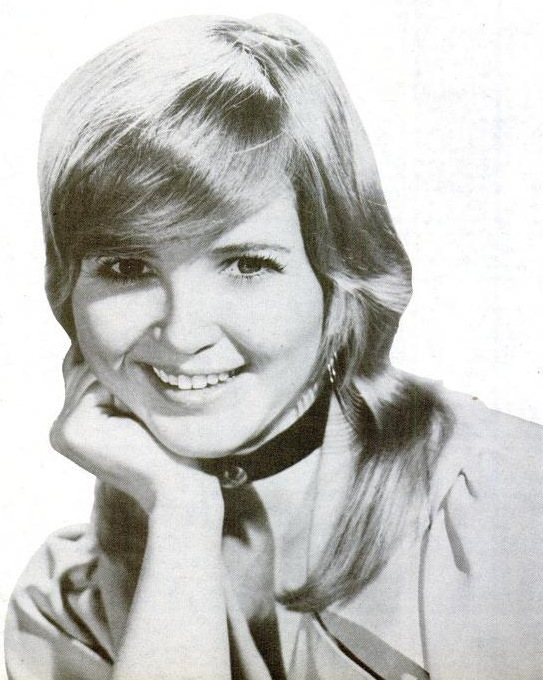
- Tucker in 1974

Background information
- Born: LaCosta Tucker; December 12, 1951 (age 74)
- Origin: Seminole, Texas, United States
- Genres: Country
- Occupations: Singer
- Instruments: Vocals
- Years active: 1974–present
- Label: Capitol

LaCosta Tucker (born December 12, 1951) is an American country music artist who recorded in the 1970s and 1980s as La Costa. The sister of country singer Tanya Tucker, LaCosta charted several singles of her own in the 1970s on the Billboard country singles chart, including the number three hit "Get on My Love Train".

== Biography ==
Born in Seminole, Texas, Tucker moved around frequently, as her father Beau Tucker was a construction worker. Tucker had two siblings, Donald, and younger sister, Tanya Tucker. Beau felt LaCosta had the talent to be a star, and Tucker won her first talent contest at age four. Between entering beauty pageants and talent shows, she performed with Tanya in a band called the Country Westerners. She graduated from Cochise College in Douglas, Arizona, and began working as a medical records technician as she sang in clubs and became Miss Country Music, Phoenix.

LaCosta met and married airline pilot Darrell Sorensen, who fathered her children and also managed her career. Around this time, Tanya was becoming a country music star. LaCosta chose to move to Las Vegas, to be near her; in 1974, Beau Tucker helped LaCosta get a recording contract with Capitol Records. Going only by the name LaCosta, she soon had a hit record with "I Wanta Get To You", which landed at number 25 on the country chart, followed by "Get on My Love Train" at number three, and "He Took Me for a Ride" at number 10. She charted 10 more singles for Capitol and recorded five albums for the label. In 1982, she moved to Elektra Records, and she charted with "Love Take It Easy on Me" under her full name of LaCosta Tucker.

In 1989, LaCosta toured with Tanya, and by the 1990s, was serving as president of Tanya's fan club. She raised two children, and for a time, made gourmet candy for sale on her sister's website.

Many of LaCosta Tucker's recordings are out of print, but a 2000 release, Sisters: An Anthology, contains some of her hits packaged together with Tanya's material.

== Discography ==
=== Studio albums ===
Title	Album details	Peak chart positions
Title	Album details	US Country
Get on My Love Train	Released: October 21, 1974; Label: Capitol; Format: LP	6
With All My Love	Released: April 21, 1975; Label: Capitol; Format: LP	33
Lovin' Somebody	Released: September 27, 1976; Label: Capitol; Format: LP	31
La Costa	Released: October 17, 1977; Label: Capitol; Format: LP	—
Changin' All the Time	Released: July 14, 1980; Label: Capitol; Format: LP	—

=== Singles ===
Title	Year	Peak chart positions		Album
Title	Year	US Country	CAN Country	Album
"I Wanta Get to You"	1974	25	—	Get on My Love Train
"Get on My Love Train"	1974	3	6	Get on My Love Train
"He Took Me for a Ride"	1975	10	21	Get on My Love Train
"This House Runs on Sunshine"	1975	19	15	With All My Love
"Western Man"	1975	11	10	Non-album single
"I Just Got a Feeling"	1976	28	—	With All My Love
"Lovin' Somebody on a Rainy Night"	1976	23	17	Lovin' Somebody
"What'll I Do"	1976	37	28	Lovin' Somebody
"We're All Alone"	1977	75	—	Non-album single
"Jessie and the Light"	1977	100	—	LaCosta
"Even Cowgirls Get the Blues"	1978	79	—	LaCosta
"#1 with a Heartache"	1978	94	—	LaCosta
"Changing All the Time"	1980	68	—	Changin' All the Time
"It Was Time"	1980	—	—	Changin' All the Time
"Love Take It Easy on Me"	1982	48	—	Non-album single
