= Bring My Flowers Now =

- Live from the Troubadour version artwork

Single by Tanya Tucker

from the album While I'm Livin'
- Released: August 16, 2019
- Recorded: January 2019
- Studio: Sunset Sound (Los Angeles)
- Genre: Country
- Length: 4:20
- Label: Fantasy
- Songwriters: Tanya Tucker; Brandi Carlile; Phil and Tim Hanseroth
- Producers: Brandi Carlile; Shooter Jennings

Tanya Tucker singles chronology
"The House That Built Me" (2019)	"Bring My Flowers Now" (2019)	"The Winner's Game" (2019)

Music video
- "Bring My Flowers Now" on YouTube

"Bring My Flowers Now" is a song by American country music singer-songwriter Tanya Tucker. The song was written by Tucker with Brandi Carlile, Tim Hanseroth and Phil Hanseroth. It was released on August 16, 2019, as the fourth single from Tucker's twenty-fifth studio album While I'm Livin'. After 14 nominations throughout her career, the song earned Tucker her first Grammy Award. "Bring My Flowers Now" won Best Country Song in addition to being nominated for Best Country Solo Performance and the all-genre Grammy Award for Song of the Year. Rolling Stone placed the song at number 3 on their Best Country and Americana Songs of 2019 list, while Billboard ranked the song at number 27 on their list of the 35 Best Country Songs of the 2010s. The song peaked at number 47 on the Billboard Hot Country Songs chart.

== Background ==
The songwriting process for "Bring My Flowers Now" began when Carlile suggested that Tucker finally finish the song she had been trying to write for 30 years. While Tucker was initially apprehensive about it, the track actually came about pretty easily. Tucker explained, "So I went into the restroom to think—I do my best thinking there—went back out, and [Brandi] was in the panel room. And we wrote this song in about 30 minutes. And then we walked in there to the vocal booth, and the band came in, and we recorded it." Tucker would later admit in interviews that she "would have liked to change a few things." She said that Carlile didn't want her to, saying that this album was about Tanya the singer, not Tanya the performer. Carlile told her, "This song sticks. This is what came out of your mouth, and that's the way we're gonna put it on there."

== Accolades ==
=== Awards ===
The song received three nominations at the 62nd Annual Grammy Awards. "Bring My Flowers Now" won Best Country Song while also being nominated for Best Country Solo Performance and the all genre award for Song of the Year.

Award	Year	Category	Result
Grammy Awards	2020	Song of the Year	Nominated
Grammy Awards	2020	Best Country Solo Performance	Nominated
Grammy Awards	2020	Best Country Song	Won
Americana Music Honors & Awards	2020	Song of the Year	Nominated
CMT Music Awards	2020	Video of the Year	Nominated

=== Year-end lists ===
Rolling Stone placed "Bring My Flowers Now" at number three on their list of the 25 Best Country and Americana Songs of 2019.

Year-end lists
Publication	List	Rank	Ref.
Rolling Stone	25 Best Country and Americana Songs of 2019	3	

=== Decade-end lists ===
Billboard ranked the song number 27 on their 35 Best Country Songs of the 2010s list.

Decade-end lists
Publication	List	Rank	Ref.
Billboard	The 35 Best Country Songs of the 2010s	27	

== Music video ==
The music video for "Bring My Flowers Now" was directed by Trey Fanjoy and released on October 22, 2019. Filmed entirely in black and white, the video depicts Tucker slowly riding horseback down a mostly deserted street with two young flower girls paving the way with flower petals. She encounters a few strangers along the way until she gets to the end of the street, where Brandi Carlile is playing piano. They tip their hats at each other and then Tucker rides off alone. It was filmed in Carthage, TN.

== Track listing ==
Digital download
No.	Title	Length
1.	"Bring My Flowers Now"	4:20

Digital download – Live from the Troubadour
No.	Title	Length
1.	"Bring My Flowers Now" (Live from the Troubadour)	5:13

== Personnel ==
Adapted from the album liner notes.

- Brandi Carlile – piano
- Tanya Tucker – vocals

== Charts ==
Chart (2020)	Peak position
US Digital Song Sales (Billboard)	33
US Hot Country Songs (Billboard)	47
