= It's a Cowboy Lovin' Night =

Single by Tanya Tucker

from the album Ridin' Rainbows
- B-side: "Wings"
- Released: April 16, 1977
- Genre: Country
- Label: MCA
- Songwriter(s): Ronnie Rogers
- Producer(s): Jerry Crutchfield

Tanya Tucker singles chronology
"Ridin' Rainbows" (1976)	"It's a Cowboy Lovin' Night" (1977)	"You Are So Beautiful" (1977)

"It's a Cowboy Lovin' Night" is a song written by Ronnie Rogers, and recorded by American country music artist Tanya Tucker. It was released in April 1977 as the second single from the album Ridin' Rainbows. The song reached #7 on the Billboard Hot Country Singles & Tracks chart.

== Chart performance ==
Chart (1977)	Peak position
US Hot Country Songs (Billboard)	7
Canadian RPM Country Tracks	2
