= Here's Some Love =

Studio album by Tanya Tucker
- Released: September 6, 1976
- Recorded: February 23–April 26, 1976
- Studio: Soundshop Studio (Nashville)
- Genre: Country
- Length: 29:12
- Label: MCA
- Producer: Jerry Crutchfield

Tanya Tucker chronology
Lovin' and Learnin' (1976)	Here's Some Love (1976)	Ridin' Rainbows (1977)

Singles from Here's Some Love
- 1. "Here's Some Love" Released: July 19, 1976; 2. "Hello Mr. Sunshine" Released: October 5, 1976; 3. "Short Cut" Released: November 8, 1976

Here's Some Love is the sixth studio album by American country music singer Tanya Tucker. It was released on September 6, 1976, by MCA Records, and hit #1 on Billboard's Hot Country LPs chart (Tucker's first). The album was produced by Jerry Crutchfield and contains Tucker's sixth No. 1 single, "Here's Some Love".

== Critical reception ==
Professional ratings
Review scores
Source	Rating
AllMusic	3.5/5 stars

The review published in the September 18, 1976, issue of Billboard said, "Excellent offering from Tucker who continues to broaden her appeal beyond the boundaries of country. Titled after her present hot single, the LP displays Tucker at her best, giving a good ride to several strong songs. Jerry Crutchfield's production is on the mark and he has combined an unusual assemblage of musicians—from Johnny Christopher to Mylon LeFevre—to provide an impressive instrumental and vocal background. Material varies from Tony Joe White's "The Gospel Singer" to David Gates' "I Use the Soap". Well balanced in material and talent, the album should move the young Tucker another giant step forward in her career. "Short Cut" indicates an almost jazzy side of Tucker with her warbling and the flute work." The review noted "Here's Some Love", "Comin' Home Alone", "Holding On", "The Gospel Singer", "I Use the Soap", and "Take Me to Heaven" as the best tracks on the album. It also included a note to record dealers which called the album "Tucker's closest approach to a crossover LP" and said that it "might generate some pop action as well as strong country sales."

The review in the September 18, 1976, issue of Cashbox said, "Reflecting a maturity of delivery, Tanya offers this slice of life with a definite feel for the so-called pop audience. Opening with the title song, which is Tanya's current hit single, each selection is tailored as a separate entity. Some are familiar, done in Tanya’s own style, others are newcomers, but the total is a superb package for anyone’s taste."

== Commercial performance ==
The album peaked at No. 1 on the US Billboard Hot Country LPs chart.

The album's first single, "Here's Some Love", was released in July 1976 and peaked at No. 1 on the US Billboard Hot Country Singles chart, No. 82 on the US Billboard Hot 100 chart, and No. 25 on the US Billboard Easy Listening chart. It peaked at No. 2 in Canada on the RPM Country Singles chart, No. 91 on the RPM Top Singles chart, and No. 33 on the RPM Adult Contemporary Singles chart. The second single, "Short Cut", was released in November 1976 and failed to chart. However, its B-side, "Ridin' Rainbows", a non-album track, received enough airplay that the label switched it to the A-side in December 1976 and it became the title track of Tucker's next album.

== Track listing ==
Standard edition

Side one
No.	Title	Writer(s)	Length
1.	"Here's Some Love"	Richard Mainegra; Jack Roberts	2:59
2.	"Round and Round the Bottle"	Susan Taylor	3:16
3.	"Comin' Home Alone"	Dave Loggins	2:03
4.	"Gonna Love You Anyway"	Layng Martine Jr.	2:03
5.	"Holding On"	Rafe van Hoy	2:43

Side two
No.	Title	Writer(s)	Length
1.	"You Just Loved the Leavin' Out of Me"	Linda Hargrove	2:16
2.	"The Gospel Singer"	Tony Joe White	4:00
3.	"Take Me to Heaven"	Mainegra; Taylor	3:24
4.	"Short Cut"	Lisa MacGregor; Alan Kroeber	3:17
5.	"I Use the Soap"	David Gates	3:11

Japan edition

Side one
No.	Title	Writer(s)	Length
1.	"Here's Some Love"	Richard Mainegra; Jack Roberts	2:59
2.	"Round and Round the Bottle"	Susan Taylor	3:16
3.	"Comin' Home Alone"	Dave Loggins	2:03
4.	"Gonna Love You Anyway"	Layng Martine Jr.	2:03
5.	"Holding On"	Rafe van Hoy	2:43

Side two
No.	Title	Writer(s)	Length
1.	"Hello Mr. Sunshine"	Veto Galati, Jr.; Mick Stewart	2:47
2.	"You Just Loved the Leavin' Out of Me"	Linda Hargrove	2:16
3.	"The Gospel Singer"	Tony Joe White	4:00
4.	"Take Me to Heaven"	Mainegra; Taylor	3:24
5.	"Short Cut"	Lisa MacGregor; Alan Kroeber	3:17
6.	"I Use the Soap"	David Gates	3:11

== Personnel ==
- Tanya Tucker - lead vocals
- Billy Sanford, Steve Gibson - electric and acoustic guitar
- Glenn Keener, Johnny Christopher - acoustic guitar
- Jack Williams - bass
- Bobby Ogdin, Shane Keister - keyboards
- Jerry Carrigan, Larrie Londin - drums
- Charlie McCoy - harmonica, congas
- Billy Puett - flute
- Christine Lakeland, Greg Gordon, Janie Fricke, Mylon LeFevre, Sheri Kramer - backing vocals
- The Nashville Strings - strings
- Bergen White - arrangements, vocals

== Charts ==
Album

Chart (1976)	Peak chart positions
US Hot Country LPs (Billboard)	1

Singles

Title	Year	Peak chart positions					
Title	Year	US Country	US	US AC	CAN Country	CAN	CAN AC
"Here's Some Love"	1976	1	82	25	2	91	33
