= Tanya Tucker (album) =

Studio album by Tanya Tucker
- Released: April 21, 1975
- Recorded: March 19–20, 1975
- Genre: Country
- Length: 29:47
- Label: MCA
- Producer: Snuff Garrett

Tanya Tucker chronology
Greatest Hits (1974)	Tanya Tucker (1975)	Lovin' and Learnin' (1976)

Singles from Tanya Tucker
- 1. "Lizzie and the Rainman" Released: April 14, 1975; 2. "San Antonio Stroll" Released: August 11, 1975; 3. "Traveling Salesman" Released: October 17, 1975

Tanya Tucker is the fourth studio album by American country music singer Tanya Tucker. It was released on April 21, 1975, as her first album for MCA Records after Columbia Records dropped Tucker from the label in 1974. The album was produced by Snuff Garrett and includes two No. 1 singles, "Lizzie and the Rainman" and "San Antonio Stroll".

== Critical reception ==
Professional ratings
Review scores
Source	Rating
AllMusic	3.5/5 stars

The review published in the May 3, 1975, issue of Billboard said, "Tanya's first MCA effort is kind of a long shot as far as the top half of the charts are concerned, but if her single hits she could do it. Producer Snuff Garrett has wisely chosen a mix of country, country oriented pop and straight pop for the set, with the intent obviously to keep her country but break her pop. Tanya still has one of the finest voices in music, pop, country or otherwise, and the new material simply offers her the chance to show off that voice in more directions. Strongest cuts are the ones leaning more toward country, though the pop oriented tunes are commercial enough. Expect pop play here. Only complaint is that from time to time the phrasing sounds a bit like Cher's. Still, it seems impossible this lady could ever make a bad album and she hasn't here." The review also noted "Lizzie and the Rainman", "Love of a Rolling Stone", "The King of Country Music", "When Will I Be Loved", "Son of a Preacher Man", "Someday Soon", and "Traveling Salesman" as the best cuts on the album.

Cashbox published a review in the May 10, 1975 issue which said, "Tanya's first LP for MCA Records was produced by Snuff Garrett and contains her current hot single "Lizzie and the Rainman". Each selection is treated to superb vocals using her untouchable style of demanding emotion from each and every selection. Some of our personal favorites are: "San Antonio Stroll", "When Will I Be Loved", "Someday Soon", and "Traveling Salesman"."

== Commercial performance ==
The album peaked at No. 8 on the US Billboard Hot Country LPs chart and No. 113 on the US Billboard Top LPs & Tape chart.

The album's first single, "Lizzie and the Rainman", was released in April 1975 and peaked at No. 1 on the US Billboard Hot Country Singles chart, No. 37 on the US Billboard Hot 100 chart, and No. 7 on the US Billboard Easy Listening chart. It also peaked at No. 1 in Canada on the RPM Country Singles chart, No. 66 on the RPM Top Singles chart, and No. 2 on the RPM Adult Contemporary Singles chart. The second single, "San Antonio Stroll", was released in August 1975 and peaked at No. 1 on the US Billboard Hot Country Singles chart No. 2 in Canada on the RPM Country Singles chart. "Traveling Salesman" was released as the second single in the UK in October 1975 and failed to chart.

== Track listing ==
Side one
No.	Title	Writer(s)	Length
1.	"Lizzie and the Rainman"	Kenny O'Dell; Larry Henley	3:05
2.	"Love of a Rolling Stone"	Jerry Chesnut	3:10
3.	"San Antonio Stroll"	Peter Noah	2:48
4.	"I'm Not Lisa"	Jessi Colter	3:28
5.	"The King of Country Music"	Steve Dorff; Milton Brown	2:31

Side two
No.	Title	Writer(s)	Length
1.	"When Will I Be Loved"	Phil Everly	2:27
2.	"The Serenade That We Played"	Lenny Roberts; Lindsay Harrison	2:55
3.	"Son of a Preacher Man"	Ronnie Wilkins; John Hurley	2:31
4.	"Someday Soon"	Ian Tyson	3:35
5.	"Traveling Salesman"	Gloria Sklerov; Harry Lloyd	3:17

== Personnel ==
Adapted from the album liner notes.

- Tanya Tucker – lead vocals
- Al Capps – arrangements
- Phil Everly — harmony vocals on "When Will I Be Loved"
- Snuff Garrett – producer
- Lenny Roberts – engineer
- Hal Blaine – percussion

== Charts ==
Album

Chart (1975)	Peak chart positions
US Hot Country LPs (Billboard)	8
US Top LPs & Tape (Billboard)	113

Singles

Title	Year	Peak chart positions					
Title	Year	US Country	US	US AC	CAN Country	CAN	CAN AC
"Lizzie and the Rainman"	1975	1	37	7	1	66	2
San Antonio Stroll"	1975	1	—	—	2	—	—
