= San Antonio Stroll =

Single by Tanya Tucker

from the album Tanya Tucker
- B-side: "The Serenade That We Played"
- Released: August 11, 1975
- Recorded: March 19, 1975
- Genre: Country
- Length: 2:51
- Label: MCA
- Songwriter(s): Peter Noah
- Producer(s): Snuff Garrett

Tanya Tucker singles chronology
"Spring" (1975)	"San Antonio Stroll" (1975)	"Greener Than the Grass (We Laid On)" (1975)

"San Antonio Stroll" is a song written by Peter Noah, and recorded by American country music artist Tanya Tucker. It was released in August 1975 as the second single from the album Tanya Tucker. It was her fifth number one on the country chart. The single stayed at number one for a single week and spent a total of eleven weeks on the country chart.

== Chart performance ==
Chart (1975)	Peak position
US Hot Country Songs (Billboard)	1
Canadian RPM Country Tracks	2

== Cover versions ==
- In 1976, Maury Finney recorded an instrumental version as the b-side to his single "Maiden's Prayer."
