= Lovin' and Learnin' =

Studio album by Tanya Tucker
- Released: January 5, 1976
- Recorded: October–November 1975
- Genre: Country
- Length: 30:53
- Label: MCA
- Producer: Jerry Crutchfield

Tanya Tucker chronology
Tanya Tucker (1975)	Lovin' and Learnin' (1976)	Here's Some Love (1976)

Singles from Lovin' and Learnin'
- 1. "Don't Believe My Heart Can Stand Another You" Released: December 1, 1975; 2. "Ain't That a Shame" Released: March 28, 1976; 3. "You've Got Me to Hold On To" Released: April 5, 1976; 4. "Pride of Franklin County" Released: May 19, 1976

Lovin' and Learnin' is the fifth studio album by American country music singer Tanya Tucker. It was released on January 5, 1976, by MCA Records. The album was produced by Jerry Crutchfield and includes two top five singles, "Don't Believe My Heart Can Stand Another You" and "You've Got Me to Hold On To".

== Critical reception ==
Professional ratings
Review scores
Source	Rating
AllMusic	3/5 stars
Christgau's Record Guide	B

The review published in the February 14, 1976 issue of Billboard said, "Tucker still does not appear to be singing quite as strongly as she could be, but the effort is a creditable one. Stronger country orientation than rock, which is to be expected. Best part of the LP are the expressive, interpretive vocals on the best of the cuts and some fine new songs from Billy Ray Reynolds, Barbara Keith and Doug Tibbles. Best cuts: "Don't Believe My Heart Can Stand Another You" (easily the best song on the album), "Pride of Franklin Country", and "Leave Him Alone". LP is first produced by Jerry Crutchfield."

The review published by Cashbox in the January 17, 1976 issue said, "Tanya says, "I’m 15, and you’re gonna hear from me", and we absolutely take her at her word as she expresses herself incomparably on this album. Produced by Jerry Crutchfield, it’s terrific Tanya throughout."

== Commercial performance ==
The album peaked at No. 3 on the US Billboard Hot Country LPs chart and No. 91 in Canada on the RPM Top Albums chart.

The album's first single, "Don't Believe My Heart Can Stand Another You", was released in December 1975 and peaked at No. 4 on the US Billboard Hot Country Singles chart and No. 1 in Canada on the RPM Country Singles chart. The second single, "Ain't That a Shame", was released in March 1976 only in the UK. The second North American single and third overall, "You've Got Me to Hold On To", was released in April 1976 and peaked at No. 3 on the US Billboard Hot Country Singles chart and No. 3 in Canada on the RPM Country Singles chart. The fourth and final single, "Pride of Franklin County", was released exclusively in Japan in May 1976.

== Track listing ==
Side one
No.	Title	Writer(s)	Length
1.	"Pride of Franklin County"	Barbara Keith; Doug Tibbles	3:27
2.	"Depend on You"	Parker McGee	3:03
3.	"Ain't That a Shame"	Antoine "Fats" Domino; Dave Bartholomew	2:29
4.	"Leave Him Alone"	Bobby Braddock; Curly Putman	2:55
5.	"You've Got Me to Hold On To"	Dave Loggins	3:04

Side two
No.	Title	Writer(s)	Length
1.	"Makin' Love Don't Always Make Love Grow"	Sterling Whipple	3:32
2.	"After the Thrill Is Gone"	Don Henley; Glenn Frey	2:50
3.	"Don't Believe My Heart Can Stand Another You"	Billy Ray Reynolds	2:48
4.	"Here We Are"	Putman; Rafe Van Hoy	2:51
5.	"My Cowboy's Getting Old"	Mary Ann Duwe	3:54

== Personnel ==
Adapted from the album liner notes.

- Tanya Tucker – lead and background vocals
- Jerry Crutchfield – background vocals
- Janie Fricke – background vocals
- Larry Gatlin – background vocals
- Bergen White – background vocals
- Jerry Carrigan – drums
- Charlie Daniels – violin
- Pete Drake – steel guitar
- Steve Gibson – guitar
- Glenn Keener – guitar
- Charlie McCoy – harmonica
- Nashville's Famous Strings – strings
- Hargus "Pig" Robbins – keyboards
- Billy Sanford – guitar
- Jack Williams – bass guitar

== Charts ==
Album

Chart (1976)	Peak chart positions
Canada Top Albums (RPM)	91
US Hot Country LPs (Billboard)	3

Singles

Title	Year	Peak chart positions	
Title	Year	US Country	CAN Country
"Don't Believe My Heart Can Stand Another You"	1975	4	1
"You've Got Me to Hold On To"	1976	3	3
