= Complicated (Tanya Tucker album) =

Studio album by Tanya Tucker
- Released: March 25, 1997
- Genre: Country
- Length: 37:00
- Label: Capitol Nashville
- Producer: Gregg Brown

Tanya Tucker chronology
Fire to Fire (1995)	Complicated (1997)	Tanya (2002)

Singles from Complicated
- 1. "Little Things" Released: February 24, 1997; 2. "Ridin' Out the Heartache" Released: June 23, 1997

Professional ratings
Review scores
Source	Rating
Allmusic	4/5 stars
Chicago Tribune	3.5/4 stars
Entertainment Weekly	B
Q	3/5 stars

Complicated is the 23rd studio album by American country music artist Tanya Tucker, it was released on March 25, 1997 on her former label Capitol Records after leaving Liberty Records. Tucker employed Gregg Brown to produce the album. One track hit the Top Ten in the Billboard Top Country Singles charts, the number 9 "Little Things." "Ridin' Out the Heartache" was the only other single to chart, at number 45. The album reached #15 on the Country Albums chart.

== Track listing ==
No.	Title	Writer(s)	Length
1.	"Ridin' Out the Heartache"	Cathy Majeski, Sunny Russ, Stephony Smith	3:55
2.	"Little Things"	Michael Dulaney, Steven Dale Jones	4:03
3.	"It Hurts Like Love"	Chuck Jones, Deborah Allen	3:29
4.	"I Don't Believe That's How You Feel"	Harlan Howard, Kostas	3:36
5.	"By the Way"	Smith, Cathy Majeski	3:16
6.	"Love Thing"	Bill LaBounty, Delbert McClinton	3:48
7.	"Wishin' It All Away"	Amanda Hunt-Taylor, Michael Lunn	4:25
8.	"Complicated"	LaBounty, Pat McLaughlin	3:40
9.	"All I Have to Offer You Is Love"	Craig Wiseman, Alisa Carroll	4:44
10.	"What Your Love Does for Me"	Austin Cunningham, Russ	3:49
11.	"You Don't Do It"	Al Anderson, Troy Seals	3:25

== Personnel ==
Compiled from liner notes.

Musicians

- Tanya Tucker - vocals
- Sam Bacco - timpani
- Mike Brignardello - bass guitar, upright bass
- Pat Buchanan - acoustic guitar, electric guitar, slide guitar, background vocals
- Larry Byrom - acoustic guitar, electric guitar
- Alisa Carroll - background vocals
- J. T. Corenflos - acoustic guitar, electric guitar
- Larry Franklin - fiddle
- G3/Hamptone - percussion
- Mike Haynes - trumpet
- John Jorgenson - electric guitar, mandolin, mandocello
- Fats Kaplin - accordion
- Billy Livsey - clavinet, Rhodes piano, Hammond organ, harmonium, Vox organ, Wurlitzer electronic piano
- Dana McVicker - background vocals
- Greg Morrow - drums
- Nashville String Machine - strings
- Hargus "Pig" Robbins - piano
- Robby Turner - Dobro, steel guitar
- Steve Turner - drums, percussion
- Billy Joe Walker Jr. - acoustic guitar, electric guitar
- Reggie Young - electric guitar

Technical

- Gregg Brown - production
- Jim DeMain - vocal recording, overdubs
- Rob Feaster - recording, engineering
- John Hampton - mixing
- Mark Nevers - engineering
- Denny Purcell - mastering
- Mike Purcell - engineering

== Charts ==
=== Weekly charts ===
Chart (1997)	Peak position
Canadian Country Albums (RPM)	11
US Billboard 200	124
US Top Country Albums (Billboard)	15

=== Year-end charts ===
Chart (1997)	Position
US Top Country Albums (Billboard)	71
