= Ridin' Rainbows =

Studio album by Tanya Tucker
- Released: February 14, 1977
- Recorded: February 23–October 20, 1976
- Genre: Country
- Length: 33:42
- Label: MCA
- Producer: Jerry Crutchfield

Tanya Tucker chronology
Here's Some Love (1976)	Ridin' Rainbows (1977)	You Are So Beautiful (1977)

Singles from Ridin' Rainbows
- 1. "Ridin' Rainbows" Released: December 13, 1976; 2. "It's a Cowboy Lovin' Night" Released: April 4, 1977; 3. "Dancing the Night Away" Released: August 1, 1977

Ridin' Rainbows is the seventh studio album by American country music singer Tanya Tucker. It was released on February 14, 1977, by MCA Records. The album was produced by Jerry Crutchfield and includes three top 20 hits; "Ridin' Rainbows", "It's a Cowboy Lovin' Night" and "Dancing the Night Away".

== Critical reception ==
Professional ratings
Review scores
Source	Rating
AllMusic	3/5 stars

The review in the February 26, 1977 issue of Billboard said, "Each LP effort brings Tanya closer to the crossover she's been striving for. Some excellent soulful singing highlighted with tasteful string arrangements by Bergen White and Jack Williams and sharp instrumentation bring out the pop potential in the young MCA artist. Members of the Amazing Rhythm Aces add backup vocals to "Dancing the Night Away" written by Russell Smith and James H. Brown Jr. and included on the Aces last album (Too Stuffed to Jump). Seals & Crofts also lend vocals on "Knee Deep in Loving You". A definite step in the right direction by Tucker and producer, Jerry Crutchfield." The review noted "Love Me Like You Never Will Again", "Wait 'Til Daddy Finds Out", "Let's Keep It That Way", Ridin' Rainbows", and "Wings" as the best cuts on the album.

== Commercial performance ==
The album peaked at No. 16 on the US Billboard Hot Country LPs chart.

The album's first single, "Ridin' Rainbows", was originally released in November 1976 as the B-side of "Short Cut" from Tucker's previous album, Here's Some Love. When "Short Cut" failed to chart and radio began to play the B-side instead, the label officially issued "Ridin' Rainbows" as a single in December 1976. It peaked at No. 12 on the US Billboard Hot Country Singles chart and No. 7 in Canada on the RPM Country Singles chart. The second single, "It's a Cowboy Lovin' Night", was released in April 1977 and peaked at No. 7 on the US Billboard Hot Country Singles chart and No. 2 in Canada on the RPM Country Singles chart. The third and final single, "Dancing the Night Away", was released in August 1977 and peaked at No. 16 on the US Billboard Hot Country Singles chart and No. 19 in Canada on the RPM Country Singles chart.

== Track listing ==
Side one
No.	Title	Writer(s)	Length
1.	"Dancing the Night Away"	Russell Smith; James H. Brown Jr.	3:31
2.	"Love Me Like You Never Will Again"	Billy Ray Reynolds	4:13
3.	"Wait 'Til Daddy Finds Out"	Dave Loggins	2:56
4.	"Let's Keep It That Way"	Curly Putman; Rafe Van Hoy	3:52
5.	"White Rocket"	Van Hoy	3:55

Side two
No.	Title	Writer(s)	Length
1.	"Ridin' Rainbows"	Jan Crutchfield; Susan Pugh; Connie Ethridge	2:40
2.	"It's a Cowboy Lovin' Night"	Ronnie Rogers	2:31
3.	"It Was Always You"	Bob McDill	3:39
4.	"I'm Knee Deep in Loving You"	Sonny Throckmorton	2:42
5.	"Wings"	Jerry Crutchfield; Gary Baker	3:43

== Charts ==
Album

Chart (1976)	Peak chart positions
US Hot Country LPs (Billboard)	16

Singles

Title	Year	Peak chart positions	
Title	Year	US Country	CAN Country
"Ridin' Rainbows"	1976	12	7
"It's a Cowboy Lovin' Night"	1977	7	2
"Dancing the Night Away"	1977	16	19
