= Lizzie and the Rainman =

Single by Tanya Tucker

from the album Tanya Tucker
- B-side: "Traveling Salesman"
- Released: April 14, 1975
- Recorded: March 19, 1975
- Genre: Pop, soft rock, country
- Length: 3:05
- Label: MCA
- Songwriters: Larry Henley, Kenny O'Dell
- Producer: Snuff Garrett

Tanya Tucker singles chronology
"I Believe the South Is Gonna Rise Again" (1974)	"Lizzie and the Rainman" (1975)	"Spring" (1975)

"Lizzie and the Rainman" is a song written by Kenny O'Dell and Larry Henley. The song was first recorded in 1972, being that year a single release for its co-writer Kenny O'Dell and an album cut for Bobby Goldsboro (California Wine) and the Hollies (Romany, under the slightly different title "Lizzy and the Rain Man").

== Background ==
"Lizzie and the Rainman" relates how a rainmaker visiting a drought-stricken West Texas town offers to make it rain for $100. Using Native American rain dance techniques (and, similar to prosperity gospel preachers, tells the people that the rain won't come if they don't believe), he is called out by a skeptical local woman named Lizzie Cooper, whom he then tries to woo.

The idea for the song came from the film The Rainmaker whose heroine is named Lizzie Curry.

== Tanya Tucker recording ==
In 1975, the song was recorded by American country music artist Tanya Tucker. A narrative song as was typical for the first phase of Tucker's career. She recorded her vocal for "Lizzie and the Rainman" in a 19 March 1975 session in Los Angeles produced by Snuff Garrett; Tucker would recall: "the recording was so impersonal. I was used to recording live with all the musicians in the studio, and I just sang to the tracks on this one." Released as the lead single from the album Tanya Tucker - which marked Tucker's MCA Records debut - "Lizzie and the Rainman" was Tucker's fourth Hot Country Songs #1 and was also her first single to make the Pop Top 40, reaching #37 on the Billboard Hot 100 in June 1975. A #7 A/C hit, "Lizzie and the Rainman" would prove to be Tucker's only Top 40 hit despite her later recording material more specifically aimed at the Pop market; her one subsequent Hot 100 item "Here's Some Love" peaked at #82.

== Chart performance ==
Chart (1975)	Peak position
Australia (Kent Music Report)	85
US Hot Country Songs (Billboard)	1
US Billboard Hot 100	37
US Adult Contemporary (Billboard)	7
Canadian RPM Country Tracks	1
Canadian RPM Top Singles	66
Canadian RPM Adult Contemporary Tracks	2

== Other recordings ==
- In 1973, Alex Taylor had a single release of the song.
