= Would You Lay with Me (In a Field of Stone) =

Studio album by Tanya Tucker
- Released: February 11, 1974
- Recorded: August 28, 1973–November 29, 1973
- Studios: Columbia (Nashville, Tennessee)
- Genre: Country
- Length: 33:16
- Label: Columbia
- Producer: Billy Sherrill

Tanya Tucker chronology
What's Your Mama's Name (1973)	Would You Lay with Me (In a Field of Stone) (1974)	Greatest Hits (1974)

Singles from Would You Lay with Me (In a Field of Stone)
- 1. "Would You Lay with Me (In a Field of Stone)" Released: December 17, 1973; 2. "The Man That Turned My Mama On" Released: May 20, 1974; 3. "I Believe the South Is Gonna Rise Again" Released: December 2, 1974

Would You Lay with Me (In a Field of Stone) is the third studio album by American country music singer Tanya Tucker. It was released on February 11, 1974, by Columbia Records. The album was produced by Billy Sherrill and includes Tucker's third No. 1 single, "Would You Lay with Me (In a Field of Stone)". It was certified Gold by the RIAA in 1995 for sales of more than 500,000 copies.

== Critical reception ==
Professional ratings
Review scores
Source	Rating
AllMusic	5/5 stars
Christgau's Record Guide	B−

In the issue dated March 2, 1974, Billboard published a review of the album which said, "The little girl who sings grown up songs has some pretty strong ones here. And she does an extraordinary amount of that done previously by others. In all, she acquits herself well. Her best is probably "How Can I Tell Him", although there are a lot of close seconds."

The review published in the February 23, 1974 issue of Cashbox said, "Currently riding high on the charts, the title track is a good indication of the kind of polish, poise and true professionalism that Tanya possesses. Her vocal capacity is surprisingly developed considering her age. But in this young lady's case age is no barrier to success as her past record of achievement clearly indicates. "How Can I Tell Him", a moving and tender ballad is finely orchestrated. A pleasing rendition of "Let Me Be There" gives this catchy song added dimension and new life. Other cuts of particular interest include the up-tempo "The Man That Turned My Mama On", "The Baptism of Jesse Taylor", and "No Man's Land"."

== Commercial performance ==
The album peaked at No. 4 on the US Billboard Hot Country LP's chart and No. 159 on the US Billboard Top LP's & Tape chart.

The album's first single, "Would You Lay with Me (In a Field of Stone)", was released in December 1973 and peaked at No. 1 on the US Billboard Hot Country Singles chart and No. 46 on the US Billboard Hot 100 chart. It also peaked at No. 1 in Canada on the RPM Country Singles chart and No. 54 on the RPM Top Singles chart. The second single, "The Man That Turned My Mama On", was released in May 1974 and peaked at No. 4 on the US Billboard Hot Country Singles chart and No. 86 on the US Billboard Hot 100 chart. It peaked at No. 10 in Canada on the RPM Country Singles chart. The third and final single, "I Believe the South Is Gonna Rise Again", was released in December 1974 and peaked at No. 18 on the US Billboard Hot Country Singles chart and No. 10 in Canada on the RPM Country Singles chart.

== Track listing ==
Side one
No.	Title	Writer(s)	Length
1.	"Would You Lay with Me (In a Field of Stone)"	David Allan Coe	2:23
2.	"How Can I Tell Him"	Roland Kent "Lobo" LaVoie	4:40
3.	"Let Me Be There"	John Rostill	2:56
4.	"Bed of Rose's"	Harold Reid	2:25
5.	"The Man That Turned My Mama On"	Ed Bruce	2:54

Side two
No.	Title	Writer(s)	Length
1.	"I Believe the South Is Gonna Rise Again"	Bobby Braddock	3:01
2.	"Old Dan Tucker's Daughter"	Curly Putman; Buddy Killen	2:53
3.	"No Man's Land"	Don Wayne	3:37
4.	"Why Me, Lord"	Kris Kristofferson	2:47
5.	"The Baptism of Jesse Taylor"	Dallas Frazier; Sanger D. Shafer	3:15
6.	"What If We Were Running Out of Love"	Linda Hargrove	2:25

== Personnel ==
Adapted from the album liner notes.

- Tanya Tucker – lead vocals
- Bill Barnes – cover design, photography
- Lou Bradley – engineer
- Bill McElhiney – string arrangements
- The Nashville Edition – background vocals
- Billy Sherrill – producer
- Bergen White – string arrangements

== Charts ==
Album

Chart (1974)	Peak chart positions
US Hot Country LP's (Billboard)	4
US Top LP's & Tape (Billboard)	159

Singles

Title	Year	Peak chart positions			
Title	Year	US Country	US	CAN Country	CAN
"Would You Lay with Me (In a Field of Stone)"	1973	1	46	7	54
"The Man That Turned My Mama On"	1974	4	86	10	—
"I Believe the South Is Gonna Rise Again"	1974	18	—	10	—

== Certifications ==
Region	Certification	Certified units/sales
United States (RIAA)	Gold	500,000^{^}
^{^} Shipments figures based on certification alone.
