= Tanya (album) =

Studio album by Tanya Tucker
- Released: September 24, 2002
- Recorded: 2002
- Studio: Emerald Sound Studio (Nashville)
- Genre: Country
- Length: 42:54
- Label: Tuckertime; Capitol Nashville
- Producer: Barry Beckett; Jerry Laseter

Tanya Tucker chronology
Complicated (1997)	Tanya (2002)	Live at Billy Bob's Texas (2005)

Singles from Tanya
- 1. "A Memory Like I'm Gonna Be" Released: July 29, 2002; 2. "Old Weakness (Coming on Strong)" Released: February 17, 2003

Professional ratings
Review scores
Source	Rating
Allmusic	3/5 stars

Tanya is the 24th studio album by American country music artist Tanya Tucker. It was released on September 24, 2002 via her own Tuckertime label and Capitol Nashville. It includes the singles "A Memory Like I'm Gonna Be" and "Old Weakness (Coming On Strong)", which peaked at number 34 and number 49 on the Billboard Hot Country Songs chart, respectively.

"Old Weakness (Coming On Strong)" and "Over My Shoulder" were originally recorded by Patty Loveless on her 1994 album When Fallen Angels Fly. The former song was recorded by Delbert McClinton and Greg Holland as well.

Giving it three stars out of five, Jonathan Widran of Allmusic said in his review, "Tucker seems, as always, adept at just about any great story and steel guitar-twanged groove that comes her way."

== Track listing ==
No.	Title	Writer(s)	Length
1.	"Old Weakness (Coming On Strong)"	Gary Nicholson; Bob DiPiero	3:34
2.	"Oh What a Love"	Jerry Laseter; Hank Cochran	3:27
3.	"Over My Shoulder"	Marcus Hummon; Roger Murrah	3:57
4.	"A Memory Like I'm Gonna Be"	Laseter; Murrah	3:10
5.	"We Had It All"	Laseter; Kerry Kurt Phillips	4:12
6.	"I Can Live Without You (But Not Very Long)"	Laseter; Phillips	3:44
7.	"I Still Hear Your Voice"	Gary Burr; Beth Hooker	2:40
8.	"Borrowed Wings"	Pat Terry, Murrah	3:59
9.	"1010 Whippoorwill Lane"	Laseter; Phillips	3:08
10.	"Should'a Thought About That"	Tanya Tucker; Laseter; Phillips	3:58
11.	"I Can Do That"	Laseter; Earl Clark; David Stewart	3:35
12.	"Waitin' for the Sun"	Monty Criswell; Murrah	3:30
Total length:			42:54

== Personnel ==
- Tanya Tucker - lead vocals, backing vocals
- Eddie Bayers - drums
- Barry Beckett - keyboards, piano
- Bekka Bramlett - backing vocals
- J. T. Corenflos - electric guitar
- Dan Dugmore - pedal steel guitar
- Vince Gill - backing vocals
- Carl Gorodetzky - string contractor
- Aubrey Haynie - mandolin
- Beth Hooker - backing vocals on "I Still Hear Your Voice"
- Jim Horn - soprano saxophone
- Ronn Huff - string arrangements
- John Barlow Jarvis - keyboards, piano
- Jerry Laseter - electric guitar
- Blue Miller - acoustic guitar
- John Wesley Ryles - backing vocals
- Lisa Silver - backing vocals
- Hank Singer - fiddle
- Willie Weeks - bass guitar
- Dennis Wilson - backing vocals

== Chart performance ==
Chart (2002)	Peak position
U.S. Billboard Top Country Albums	39
