= Tanya Tucker =

American country singer (born 1958)

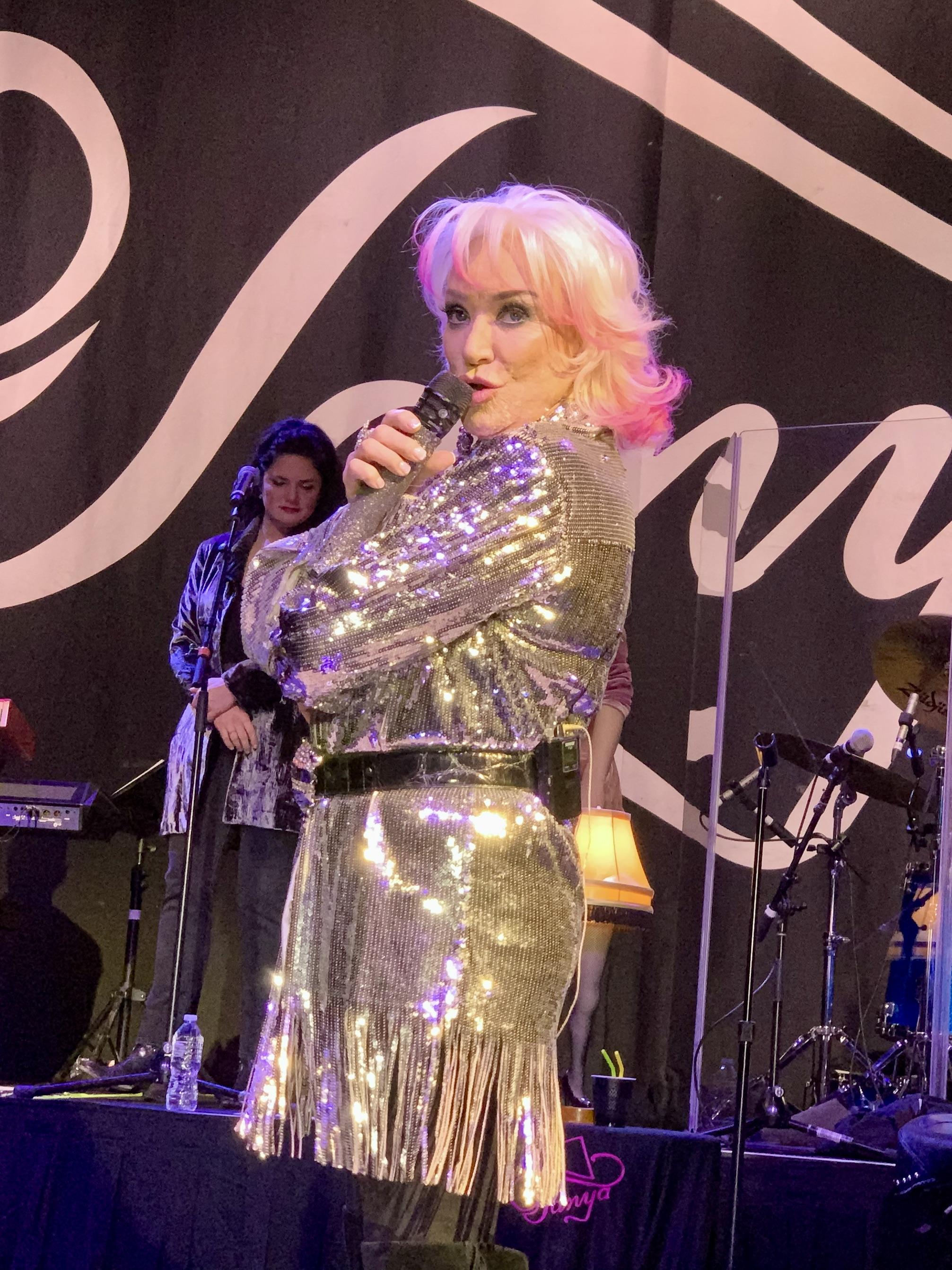
- Tucker performing at Graceland in 2020

Background information
- Born: Tanya Denise Tucker; October 10, 1958 (age 68); Seminole, Texas, U.S.
- Genres: Country; outlaw country; country rock
- Occupations: Singer; songwriter
- Years active: 1971–present
- Labels: Columbia; MCA; Arista; Capitol Nashville; Liberty; Capitol; Tuckertime; Saguaro Road; Fantasy
- Website: tanyatucker.com

Tanya Denise Tucker (born October 10, 1958) is an American country singer who had her first hit, "Delta Dawn", in 1972 at the age of 13. During her career Tucker became one of the few child performers to mature into adulthood without losing her audience; she had a streak of top-10 and top-40 hits. She has had several successful albums, several Country Music Association award nominations, and hit songs including 1973's "What's Your Mama's Name?" and "Blood Red and Goin' Down", 1975's "Lizzie and the Rainman", 1988's "Strong Enough to Bend", and 1992's "Two Sparrows in a Hurricane". Tucker's 2019 album While I'm Livin' won the Grammy Award for Best Country Album, and "Bring My Flowers Now" from that same album won Tucker a shared songwriting Grammy for Best Country Song.

Tucker’s latest album is a 2023 critically acclaimed collaboration with Brandi Carlile called Sweet Western Sound. Tucker was inducted into the Country Music Hall of Fame on October 22, 2023.

== Early life ==
Tanya Denise Tucker was born in Seminole, Texas, the youngest of three children born to Alma Juanita (née Cunningham; 1927–2012) and Jesse Melvin "Beau" Tucker (1927–2006). Prior to managing Tanya's career, Beau was a heavy equipment operator, so the family moved often as he sought better work. Her early childhood was spent primarily in Willcox, Arizona, where the only radio station in town, KHIL, played country music. The Tuckers attended concerts of country stars such as Ernest Tubb and Mel Tillis, and Tanya's sister LaCosta was praised in the family for her vocal abilities. At the age of eight, Tanya told her father that she also wanted to be a country singer when she grew up.

When the Tuckers moved to St. George, Utah, Juanita took Tanya to audition for the film Jeremiah Johnson. Tanya did not win the bigger role for which she tried out, but she was hired, as was her horse, as a bit player (as Quallen's oldest daughter). About this time, she also received one of her first musical breaks, when her father drove the family to Phoenix for the Arizona State Fair, on the chance that the featured performer, country singer Judy Lynn, could use Tanya in her show. Tanya sang for the fair's entertainment managers, and she was engaged to sing at the fair itself.

Tucker made her debut with Mel Tillis, who was so impressed by her talent that he invited her onstage to perform. In 1969, the family moved to Henderson, Nevada, where Tucker regularly performed. Eventually, she recorded a demonstration tape that gained the attention of songwriter Dolores Fuller, who sent it to producer Billy Sherrill, the head of artists and repertoire at CBS Records. Sherrill was impressed with the demo tape and signed the teenage vocalist to Columbia Records.

== Career ==
=== 1972–1979: Teen country star ===
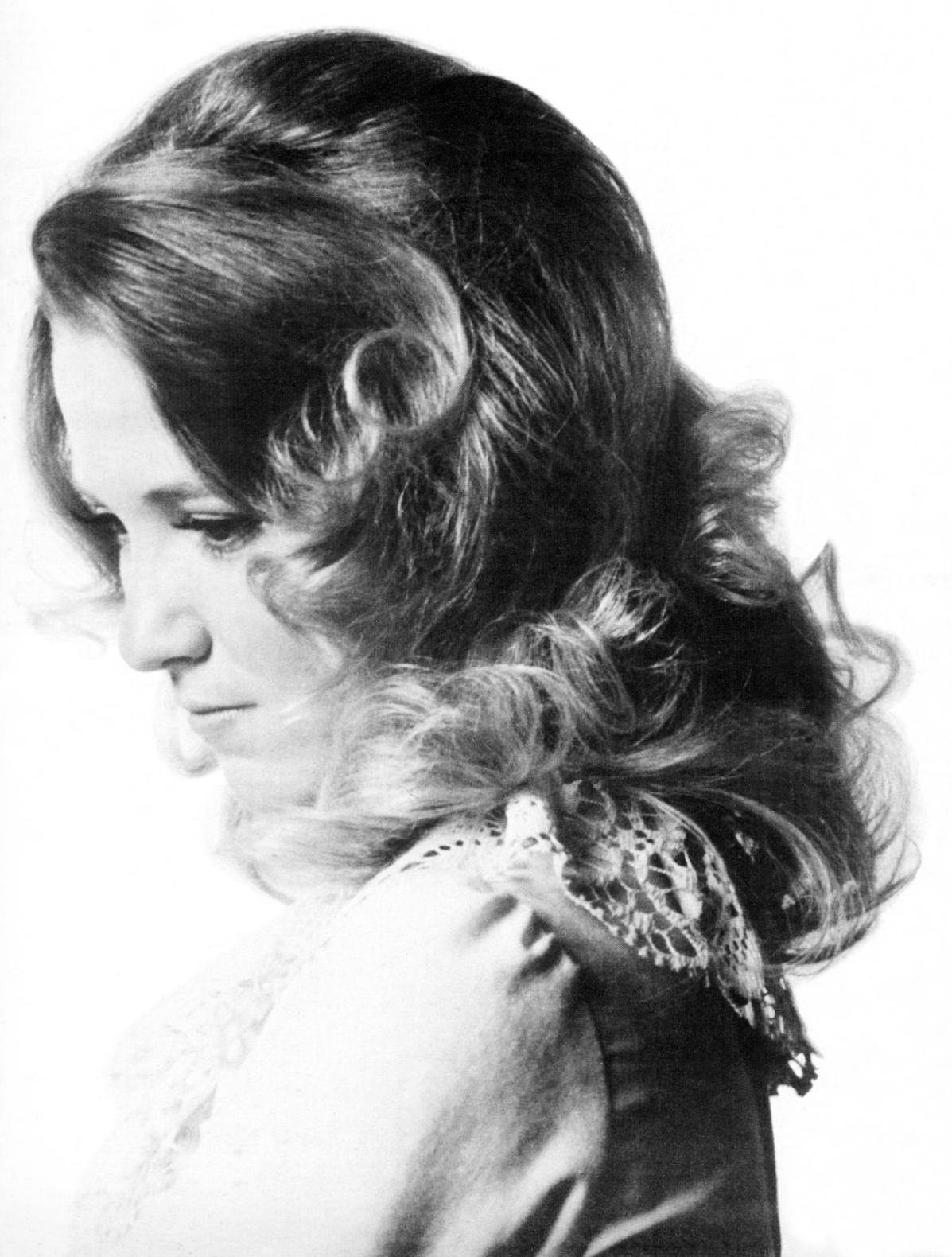
Tucker in a 1973 promotional portrait for Columbia Records

Sherrill initially planned to have Tucker record "The Happiest Girl in the Whole USA", but she chose "Delta Dawn" – a song Billy Sherrill heard Bette Midler sing on The Tonight Show – instead as her first single while Donna Fargo, the writer of "The Happiest Girl in the Whole USA", released her own version as a single. Released in May 1972, the song became a hit, peaking at number six on the country chart and scraping the bottom of the pop chart. At first, Columbia Records tried to downplay Tucker's age, but soon word leaked out and she became a sensation. A year later, Australian singer Helen Reddy scored a number-one U.S. pop hit with her version of "Delta Dawn".

"I thank the lucky stars and the Good Lord for that song," Tucker told Nine-O-One Network Magazine in 1988. "If I cut it now for the first time I think it would be a hit. I was fortunate to have latched onto that one, and that was all Sherrill's doing. If it hadn't been for Sherrill, I probably would have been a rodeo queen or something."

Her second single, "Love's the Answer", also became a top-10 hit later in 1972. Tucker's third single, "What's Your Mama's Name", became her first number-one hit in the spring of 1973. Two other number ones – "Blood Red and Goin' Down" and "Would You Lay with Me (In a Field of Stone)" followed, establishing Tucker as a major star.

In 1975, she signed with MCA Records, where she had a string of hit singles that ran into the late 1970s.

Among these hits was "Lizzie and the Rainman", which became a number-one country hit, and also became Tucker's only top-40 pop music hit, peaking at number 37. It also peaked among the top 10 on the adult contemporary charts at the time. Tucker has a string of top-10 country hits under MCA between 1975 and 1978, including "San Antonio Stroll", "Here's Some Love", and "It's a Cowboy Lovin' Night".

In 1977, she recorded "You Taught Me How to Cry," a duet with Hoyt Axton on his album Snowblind Friend.

In 1978, she decided to radically change her image and cross over to rock with her TNT album. Despite the controversy over the record and its sexy cover, it went gold the following year.

The two hit singles from the album were "I'm a Singer, You're the Song", and "Texas (When I Die)". The latter reached number five on the country charts, and its B-side, "Not Fade Away", a Buddy Holly cover, peaked at number 70 on the Billboard Hot 100.

=== 1979–1984: Sales decline and personal battles ===
By the end of the 1970s, her sales were declining – in 1980 she only had two hits, one of them was "Can I See You Tonight?". Also in 1980, she recorded a few singles with Glen Campbell, with whom she was romantically linked. In addition to recording, she also made her feature-film debut in Hard Country, although she did have small roles in Jeremiah Johnson (1972) and the television miniseries The Rebels (1979).

She also had begun drinking in her late teens; later, she explained how it started:

You send your ass out on the road doing two gigs a night and after all that adoration go back to empty hotel rooms. Loneliness got me into it.

In 1978, Tucker moved to Los Angeles to try, unsuccessfully, to broaden her appeal to pop audiences, and was quickly captivated by the city's nightlife. She also said that she "was the wildest thing out there. I could stay up longer, drink more and kick the biggest ass in town. I was on the ragged edge."

Despite having a top 10 hit in March 1983 ("Feel Right") from her first and only Arista album Changes, she struggled to have her music played on the radio. By mid-1983, her singles were no longer making the top 40.

She moved to Nashville after her breakup with Campbell in 1982 and began to lead a more secluded life. Finally, in 1988, her family confronted her and persuaded her to enter the Betty Ford Center.

=== 1986–1997: Comeback ===
In 1986, Tucker signed with Capitol Records; she returned to the charts with "One Love at a Time", which climbed to number three. Her career was revitalized with 1986's Girls Like Me, an album that spawned four top-10 country singles. In 1988, she had three number-one country singles: "I Won't Take Less Than Your Love" (with Paul Davis and Paul Overstreet), "If It Don't Come Easy", and "Strong Enough to Bend".

Her music was now more country pop-styled and up-tempo, but this material made Tucker popular again. Between 1988 and 1989, Tucker enjoyed one of her most popular years on the charts, racking up eight country top-10 hits in a row. Her albums around this time were also achieving "Gold" certifications by the RIAA, after selling 500,000 copies. A Greatest Hits album followed in 1989. It also contained a new single called "My Arms Stay Open All Night". Radio responded well; the song peaked at number two.

In 1988, Tucker was nominated by the Country Music Association for "Female Vocalist of the Year", and was nominated for other major awards during this time. Her contribution to the country music genre was rewarded when the Country Music Association voted her the "Female Vocalist of the Year" in 1991, though she missed the event, having just given birth to her second child. Eight consecutive singles reached the top 10 in the early 1990s, including "Down to My Last Teardrop", "(Without You) What Do I Do with Me", and "Two Sparrows in a Hurricane". In 1990, Tucker was named "Female Video Artist of the Year" by CMT. Although by the 1990s, she no longer had number-one hits, many singles came close peaking in the country top five, as well as the top 10. Tucker was one of the most successful female country artists at the time. She became one of the few teen stars to find success in her adult years.

Her 1993 album Greatest Hits 1990-1992 rose to number 15, and also went to number 18 on the Top Country Albums chart. Liberty Records was changed to Capitol Nashville in 1994.

By the 1990s, Tucker was a 20-year veteran in country music, though she was only in her mid-30s. In 1994, "Hangin' In" was her last top-five hit, as well as her last top-10 hit for a while. That year, she performed at the half-time show at Super Bowl XXVIII. In 1996, she was one of the top-10 most-played artists of the year, and at the time was also Capitol Records' biggest signed female artist. In 1997, she returned to the top 10 on the country charts for the last time with the hit, "Little Things", which peaked at number nine. That year she was inducted into the Texas Country Music Hall of Fame.

=== 2000–present: Music career today ===
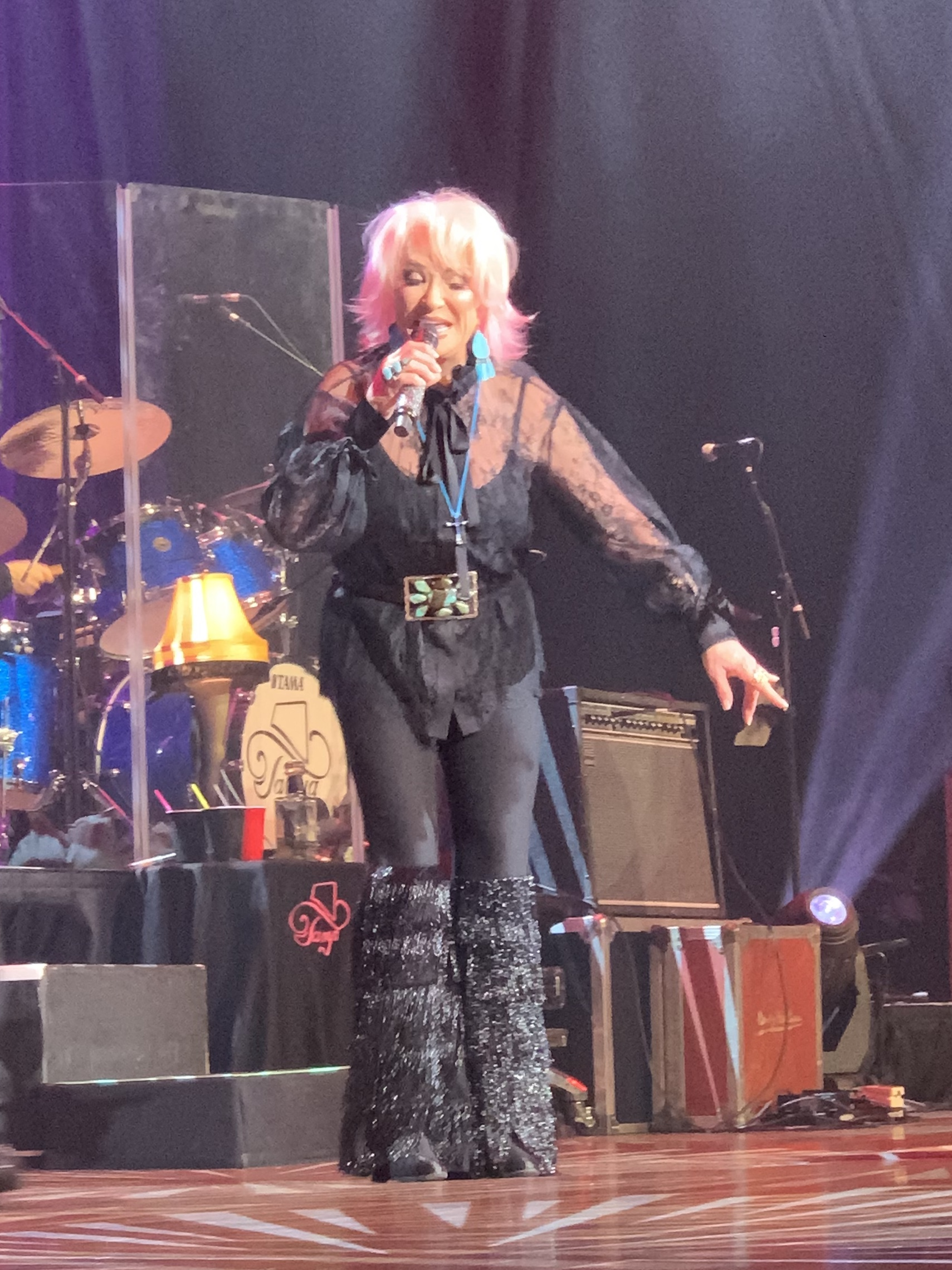
Tucker performing at the Ryman Auditorium in 2020

In 2002, Tucker founded Tuckertime Records, allowing her to retain control of the recording process and release the singles she wished to release. The same year, she issued Tanya, her first album in five years, which was distributed through Capitol Records.

In 2002, Tucker was ranked number 20 on CMT's 40 Greatest Women of Country Music. In 2005, she released an album, Live at Billy Bob's Texas. In 2005, she also contributed two songs to a tribute album to Bob Wills, called A Tribute to Bob Wills 100th Anniversary. In 2005, she released a book, 100 Ways to Beat the Blues on Fireside, which included tips on shaking the blues, from some of Tucker's friends such as Willie Nelson, Brenda Lee, Little Richard, and Burt Reynolds.

Tucker recorded an album, Lonesome Town, around 2007, but it has never been released. The same year, she recorded a live concert at the Renaissance Center in December. Tucker also sang a duet with country music artist Billy Joe Shaver, of Shaver's song, "Played the Game Too Long", on his album, Everybody's Brother, released in September 2007.

In 2009, Tucker signed a one-time deal with Saguaro Road Records from Time-Life. Tucker's "Lonesome Town" project was put on hold to do the first cover album of her career, My Turn, which was released in June 2009 and placed number 27 on the Billboard country charts. The first single, "Love's Gonna Live Here", was released to radio and was also available as a digital single. It is a remake of the classic hit by Buck Owens. The album includes classic country hits such as "Wine Me Up", "Lovesick Blues", "You Don't Know Me", "Ramblin' Fever", "Walk Through This World With Me", "Big Big Love", "Crazy Arms", "After The Fire Is Gone", and "Oh Lonesome Me".

Tucker appeared on Terri Clark's 2012 album Classic in a remake duet of her first single "Delta Dawn".

In June 2017, Tucker was featured in Rolling Stone as one of the 100 Greatest Country Artists of All Time.

After the death of former flame Glen Campbell on August 8, 2017, Tucker released her first single since 2009, "Forever Loving You", a song co-penned by Tennessee State Senator Rusty Crowe. The song's release the following day, on the eve of Campbell's funeral, drew ire and criticism being exploitative. Tucker claimed that a portion of the proceeds will benefit the Alzheimer's Foundation of America, but the foundation stated it was not involved in the promotion and has not received any funds.

Tucker released While I'm Livin', her first collection of original material since 2002's Tanya, in 2019 via Fantasy Records. It was produced by Shooter Jennings and Brandi Carlile, with Carlile brought onto the project after initially being approached for songs by Jennings but after having professed such an admiration of Tucker and her work, Jennings felt it necessary for her to co-produce the record alongside him. Tucker performed "Bring My Flowers Now" at Loretta Lynn's all-star 87th birthday concert at Nashville's Bridgestone Arena with Carlile playing piano. The album's first single, "Hard Luck", was released on June 28, along with its accompanying music video.

On January 26, 2020, Tanya Tucker won her first two Grammy Awards for "Bring My Flowers Now" and "While I'm Livin'". Tucker released a live album, Live from the Troubadour on October 16, 2020. In a 2021 interview with Rolling Stone, Tucker revealed that she was working on a follow-up to While I'm Livin' with Carlile and Jennings. Tucker collaborated with RuPaul for "This is Our Country" in September 2021.

During her 2022 set at Stagecoach Festival, Tucker revealed completing a new album. Tanya announced her studio album Sweet Western Sound on April 5, 2023, releasing the first single, "Kindness". Sweet Western Sound was produced by Tucker along with Brandi Carlile and Shooter Jennings, and released June 2, 2023, on Fantasy Records.

=== Outlaw image ===
Like the other Outlaw artists in the business at the time (Waylon Jennings, Johnny Cash, Willie Nelson, Kris Kristofferson, Jessi Colter, Emmylou Harris, David Allan Coe, Hank Williams Jr.), Tucker was able to combine qualities of country and rock music into her voice to make the Outlaw sound that was popular at the time. These qualities could be heard on some of her biggest hits at the time, including 1978's "Texas (When I Die)". She ranked number nine on CMT Greatest Outlaws: The Dirty Dozen, the only woman to appear on that list.

Gretchen Wilson made reference to Tucker in her 2004 hit song "Redneck Woman", and Tucker appears briefly in the video of the song, showing Tucker with other Outlaws.

== The Return of Tanya Tucker ==
17 years after Tucker slipped from the spotlight, musician Brandi Carlile collaborated with her on the album While I'm Livin', as well as a documentary based on Tucker's life. The Return of Tanya Tucker: Featuring Brandi Carlile was released in New York and Los Angeles on October 21, 2022, and nationwide on November 4. It was accompanied by the track "Ready As I'll Never Be".

== Other works ==
Tucker appeared as a celebrity judge on Dance Fever in 1979.

She appeared in two country music-themed episodes of The Love Boat in 1983.

She published a 1997 autobiography, Nickel Dreams: My Life.

She starred in her own reality show, Tuckerville, on TLC in 2005. It ran for two seasons for 18 episodes. The show covers an in-depth visit with Tucker in her home with her family.

Tucker continues to perform for the military doing benefits with newer country acts such as Eric Agnew and Cole Deggs & the Lonesome.

In 2019, she launched her own brand of tequila called Cosa Salvaje.

== Personal life ==
Tucker had a relationship with Glen Campbell in the early 1980s. She also dated Merle Haggard, Andy Gibb, and Don Johnson.

She later had a relationship with actor Ben Reed, with whom she had daughter Presley Tanita (b. July 5, 1989) and son Beau "Grayson" (b. October 2, 1991).

Tucker has had an on-again, off-again relationship with Jerry Laseter, a Nashville musician. They were engaged in 1997 and again in 1999. Just days before their 1999 wedding, Tucker canceled the ceremony when she discovered she was pregnant with her third child, Tucker's daughter Layla LaCosta (b. June 25, 1999), saying she did not want to walk down the aisle pregnant in her wedding dress. Laseter was co-producer of Tucker's albums in 2002 (Tanya), 2005 (Live at Billy Bob's Texas), and 2009 (My Turn).

Tucker's brother is Don (deceased) and her sister is country singer La Costa.

In 2022, Tucker sold her Brentwood, Tennessee, home (purchased three years earlier for $1,510,000) for $2,275,000.

== Awards and nominations ==
Award	Year	Recipient(s) and nominee(s)	Category	Result	Ref.
Academy of Country Music Awards	1972	Tanya Tucker	Most Promising Female Vocalist	Won	
Academy of Country Music Awards	1975	Tanya Tucker	Top Female Vocalist of the Year	Nominated	
Academy of Country Music Awards	1987	Tanya Tucker	Top Female Vocalist	Nominated	
Academy of Country Music Awards	1988	Tanya Tucker	Top Female Vocalist	Nominated	
Academy of Country Music Awards	1988	"Strong Enough to Bend"	Song of the Year	Nominated	
Academy of Country Music Awards	1988	"Strong Enough to Bend"	Single Record of the Year	Nominated	
Academy of Country Music Awards	1989	Tanya Tucker	Top Female Vocalist	Nominated	
Academy of Country Music Awards	1990	"Don't Go Out" (with T. Graham Brown)	Top Vocal Duet	Nominated	
Academy of Country Music Awards	1990	Tanya Tucker	Top Female Vocalist	Nominated	
Academy of Country Music Awards	1991	Tanya Tucker	Top Female Vocalist	Nominated	
Academy of Country Music Awards	1992	"Two Sparrows in a Hurricane"	Video of the Year	Won	
Academy of Country Music Awards	1992	"Two Sparrows in a Hurricane"	Song of the Year	Nominated	
Academy of Country Music Awards	1992	"Two Sparrows in a Hurricane"	Single Record of the Year	Nominated	
Academy of Country Music Awards	1992	Tanya Tucker	Top Female Vocalist	Nominated	
Academy of Country Music Awards	1993	Tanya Tucker	Top Female Vocalist	Nominated	
Academy of Country Music Awards	1993	Common Thread: The Songs of the Eagles	Album of the Year	Nominated	
Academy of Country Music Awards	2015	Tanya Tucker	Cliffie Stone Pioneer Award	Won	
Country Music Association Awards	1973	Tanya Tucker	Female Vocalist of the Year	Nominated	
Country Music Association Awards	1974	Tanya Tucker	Female Vocalist of the Year	Nominated	
Country Music Association Awards	1975	Tanya Tucker	Female Vocalist of the Year	Nominated	
Country Music Association Awards	1988	Tanya Tucker	Female Vocalist of the Year	Nominated	
Country Music Association Awards	1988	"I Won't Take Less Than Your Love" (with Paul Davis and Paul Overstreet)	Vocal Event of the Year	Nominated	
Country Music Association Awards	1989	Tanya Tucker	Female Vocalist of the Year	Nominated	
Country Music Association Awards	1990	Tanya Tucker	Female Vocalist of the Year	Nominated	
Country Music Association Awards	1990	"Don't Go Out" (with T. Graham Brown)	Vocal Even of the Year	Nominated	
Country Music Association Awards	1991	Tanya Tucker	Female Vocalist of the Year	Won	
Country Music Association Awards	1992	What Do I Do with Me	Album of the Year	Nominated	
Country Music Association Awards	1992	Tanya Tucker	Female Vocalist of the Year	Nominated	
Country Music Association Awards	1993	Tanya Tucker	Female Vocalist of the Year	Nominated	
Country Music Association Awards	1993	"Two Sparrows in a Hurricane"	Single of the Year	Nominated	
Country Music Association Awards	1993	"Tell Me About It" (with Delbert McClinton)	Vocal Event of the Year	Nominated	
Country Music Association Awards	1994	Common Thread: The Songs of the Eagles	Album of the Year	Won	
Country Music Association Awards	1994	Rhythm, Country and Blues	Album of the Year	Nominated	
Grammy Awards	1973	"Delta Dawn"	Best Female Country Vocal Performance	Nominated	
Grammy Awards	1975	"Would You Lay with Me (In a Field of Stone)"	Best Female Country Vocal Performance	Nominated	
Grammy Awards	1980	TNT	Best Female Rock Vocal Performance	Nominated	
Grammy Awards	1981	"Dream Lover" (with Glen Campbell)	Best Country Vocal Performance by a Duo or Group	Nominated	
Grammy Awards	1988	"Love Me Like You Used To"	Best Female Country Vocal Performance	Nominated	
Grammy Awards	1989	"Strong Enough to Bend"	Best Female Country Vocal Performance	Nominated	
Grammy Awards	1992	"Down to My Last Teardrop"	Best Female Country Vocal Performance	Nominated	
Grammy Awards	1993	"Tell Me About It" (with Delbert McClinton)	Best Country Collaboration with Vocals	Nominated	
Grammy Awards	1994	"Soon"	Best Female Country Vocal Performance	Nominated	
Grammy Awards	1994	"Romeo" (with Dolly Parton, Billy Ray Cyrus, Mary Chapin Carpenter, Pam Tillis, Kathy Mattea)	Best Country Collaboration with Vocals	Nominated	
Grammy Awards	2020	While I'm Livin'	Best Country Album	Won	
Grammy Awards	2020	"Bring My Flowers Now"	Song of the Year	Nominated	
Grammy Awards	2020	"Bring My Flowers Now"	Best Country Solo Performance	Nominated	
Grammy Awards	2020	"Bring My Flowers Now"	Best Country Song	Won	
Americana Music Awards	2020	Tanya Tucker	Artist of the Year	Nominated	
Americana Music Awards	2020	While I'm Livin'	Album of the Year	Nominated	
Americana Music Awards	2020	Bring My Flowers Now	Song of the Year	Nominated	

== Discography ==
Studio albums

- Delta Dawn (1972)
- What's Your Mama's Name (1973)
- Would You Lay with Me (In a Field of Stone) (1974)
- Tanya Tucker (1975)
- Lovin' and Learnin' (1976)
- Here's Some Love (1976)
- Ridin' Rainbows (1977)
- TNT (1978)
- Tear Me Apart (1979)
- Dreamlovers (1980)
- Should I Do It (1981)
- Changes (1982)
- Girls Like Me (1986)
- Love Me Like You Used To (1987)
- Strong Enough to Bend (1988)
- Tennessee Woman (1990)
- Greatest Hits Encore (1990)
- What Do I Do with Me (1991)
- Can't Run from Yourself (1992)
- Soon (1993)
- Fire to Fire (1995)
- Complicated (1997)
- Tanya (2002)
- My Turn (2009)
- While I'm Livin' (2019)
- Sweet Western Sound (2023)
