= List of songs recorded by Tanya Tucker =

American country artist Tanya Tucker has released 25 studio albums throughout her career. At age 13, Tucker released her debut album Delta Dawn (1972) on Columbia Records. It peaked at No. 32 on the Billboard Top Country Albums chart. This album was followed by What's Your Mama's Name (1973) and Would You Lay with Me (In a Field of Stone) (1974), which were both certified Gold by the RIAA. Tucker moved to MCA Records in 1975 and released a self-titled album the same year. It peaked at No. 8 on the Top Country Albums chart and No. 113 on the Billboard 200. Between 1976 and 1977 she issued four studio albums before the release of TNT (1978), which was marketed towards a rock audience. It was also certified Gold by the RIAA.

After releasing three commercially unsuccessful albums, Tucker made a successful comeback on Capitol Records with Girls Like Me (1986). The album peaked at No. 20 on the Top Country Albums chart and produced four top 10 hits on the Billboard Hot Country Songs chart. Tucker released two more successful albums in the 1980s: Love Me Like You Used To (1987) and Strong Enough to Bend (1988). What Do I Do with Me (1991) became her first album to be certified Platinum by the RIAA. The album was also certified Gold in Canada. Can't Run from Yourself (1992) reached No. 12 on the Top Country Albums chart, No. 51 on the Billboard 200 and was certified Platinum by the RIAA. After releasing three more studio albums in the 1990s, Tucker released Tanya (2002) on her own Tuckertime Records. In 2009, Tucker released her twenty-fourth studio album, My Turn, which featured covers of classic country hits. After a 10-year hiatus, Tucker returned in 2019 with the studio album While I'm Livin', produced by Brandi Carlile and Shooter Jennings. In 2023 Tucker once again collaborated with Carlile and Jennings with the critically acclaimed album Sweet Western Sound.

== Released songs ==
Title	Artist(s)	Writer(s)	Album	Year	Ref
"1010 Whippoorwill Lane"	Tanya Tucker	Jerry Laseter; Kerry Kurt Phillips	Tanya	2002	
"A Blue Guitar"	Tanya Tucker	Dennis Linde	Soon	1993	
"A Memory Like I'm Gonna Be"	Tanya Tucker	Jerry Laseter; Roger Murrah	Tanya	2002	
"A Rock 'n' Roll Girl from Alaska"	Tanya Tucker	Peter Shuey; Mick Stewart	Non-album single	1977	
"A Thing Called Love"	Tanya Tucker	Jerry Reed Hubbard	Changes	1982	
"A Voice Still Rings True"	Event / Various (Note: Joe Diffie, Ricky Skaggs, T. Graham Brown, Tanya Tucker, Sawyer Brown, Steve Wariner, Earl Thomas Conley, Deborah Allen, Mark Collie, John Anderson, Ken Mellons, and Mac McAnally)	Larry Cordle; Randy Scruggs	Keith Whitley: A Tribute Album	1995	
"After the Fire Is Gone"	Tanya Tucker	L.E. White	My Turn	2009	
"After the Thrill Is Gone"	Tanya Tucker	Don Henley; Glenn Frey	Lovin' and Learnin'	1976	
"Ain't That a Shame"	Tanya Tucker	Antonio Domino; Dave Bartholomew	Lovin' and Learnin'	1976	
"Alien"	Tanya Tucker	Bobby Braddock	Love Me Like You Used To	1987	
"All I Have to Offer You Is Love"	Tanya Tucker	Craig Wiseman	Complicated	1997	
"All the Way"	Tanya Tucker	Bob Morrison; Jim Zerface	Dreamlovers	1980	
"Almost Persuaded"	Tanya Tucker	Billy Sherrill; Glenn Sutton	You Are So Beautiful	1977	
"Already Gone"	Tanya Tucker	Jack Tempchin; Robb Strandlund	Common Thread: The Songs of the Eagles	1993	
"An American Woman"	Tanya Tucker	Anita Cox; Sherry Johnson	Never Forget...	2008	
"Angel from Montgomery"	Tanya Tucker	John Prine	TNT	1978	
"As Long as I'm Dreamin'"	Tanya Tucker	Jeff Cook; Teddy Gentry; John Jarrard; Gary Nicholson	Strong Enough to Bend	1988	
"As Long as There's a Heartbeat"	Tanya Tucker	David Powelson	Tennessee Woman	1990	
"Away in a Manger"	Tanya Tucker	Traditional	A Christmas Gift	1974	
"Baby I'm Yours"	Tanya Tucker	Van Allen McCoy	Changes	1982	
"Back in Harmony"	Charlie Louvin featuring Tanya Tucker	Shel Silverstein; Mickey James; Rich Fagan	50 Years of Makin' Music	1991	
"Back on My Feet"	Tanya Tucker	Max D. Barnes; Troy Seals	Strong Enough to Bend	1988	
"Bed of Rose's"	Tanya Tucker	Don Reid	Would You Lay with Me (In a Field of Stone)	1974	
"Best of My Love"	Tanya Tucker	Don Henley; Glenn Frey; JD Souther	You Are So Beautiful	1977	
"Better Late Than Never"	Tanya Tucker	Steve Krikorian	Tear Me Apart	1979	
"Between the Two of Them"	Tanya Tucker	Mickey Cates	Fire to Fire	1995	
"Bidding America Goodbye (The Auction)"	Tanya Tucker	Jamie O'Hara	What Do I Do with Me	1991	
"Big, Big Love"	Tanya Tucker	Ray Carroll; Wynn Stewart	My Turn	2009	
"Black Water Bayou"	Tanya Tucker	Matraca Berg; Ronnie Samoset	Soon	1993	
"Blind Love"	Tanya Tucker	Dennis Linde	Tear Me Apart	1979	
"Blood Red and Goin' Down"	Tanya Tucker	Curly Putman	What's Your Mama's Name	1973	
"Blood Red and Goin' Down"	Tanya Tucker	Curly Putman	Live	1982	
"Blood Red and Goin' Down"	Tanya Tucker	Curly Putman	Greatest Hits Encore	1990	
"Borrowed Wings"	Tanya Tucker	Pat Terry; Roger Murrah	Tanya	2002	
"Bring My Flowers Now"	Tanya Tucker	Tanya Tucker; Brandi Carlile; Tim Hanseroth; Phil Hanseroth	While I'm Livin'	2019	
"Brown Eyed Handsome Man"	Tanya Tucker	Chuck Berry	TNT	1978	
"By Day by Day"	Tanya Tucker	Dennis Linde	Tear Me Apart	1979	
"By the Way"	Tanya Tucker	Stephony Smith; Cathy Majeski	Complicated	1997	
"California Cotton Field"	Tanya Tucker	Dallas Frazier; Earl Montgomery	What's Your Mama's Name	1973	
"Call on Me"	Tanya Tucker	Gary Scruggs	Strong Enough to Bend	1988	
"Can I See You Tonight"	Tanya Tucker	Deborah Allen; Rafe Van Hoy	Dreamlovers	1980	
"Can I See You Tonight"	Tanya Tucker	Deborah Allen; Rafe Van Hoy	Live	1982	
"Can't Run from Yourself"	Tanya Tucker	Marshall Chapman	Can't Run from Yourself	1992	
"Changes"	Tanya Tucker	Tanya Tucker; Frank J. Myers; Eddy Raven	Changes	1982	
"Chasing the American Dream"	Tanya Tucker	Angela Kaset; Nancy Bergen	Tanya Tucker	1994	
"Christmas to Christmas"	Tanya Tucker	Alan Rhody; Ron Hellard	Christmas for the '90s, Vol. 3	1995	
"Come in Out of the World"	Tanya Tucker	Don Schlitz; Billy Livsey	Fire to Fire	1995	
"Come on Honey"	Tanya Tucker	Paul Davis	Soon	1993	
"Comin' Home Alone"	Tanya Tucker	Dave Loggins	Here's Some Love	1976	
"Complicated"	Tanya Tucker	Bill LaBounty; Pat McLaughlin	Complicated	1997	
"Crazy Arms"	Tanya Tucker	Ralph Mooney; Chuck Seals	My Turn	2009	
"Crossfire of Desire"	Tanya Tucker	Casey Kelly; Julie Didier; Lewis Anderson	Tear Me Apart	1979	
"Cry"	Tanya Tucker	Garth Murphy; Frank Musker	Changes	1982	
"Daddy and Home"	Tanya Tucker	Jimmie Rodgers; Elsie McWilliams	Strong Enough to Bend	1988	
"Daddy Long Legs"	Tanya Tucker	Marshall Chapman	Girls Like Me	1986	
"Dancing the Night Away"	Tanya Tucker	Russell Smith; James H. Brown, Jr.	Ridin' Rainbows	1977	
"Danger Ahead"	Tanya Tucker	Paul Kennerley	Can't Run from Yourself	1992	
"Delta Dawn"	Tanya Tucker	Alex Harvey; Larry Collins	Delta Dawn	1972	
"Delta Dawn"	Tanya Tucker	Alex Harvey; Larry Collins	Live	1982	
"Delta Dawn"	Tanya Tucker	Alex Harvey; Larry Collins	Greatest Hits Encore	1990	
"Delta Dawn"	Terri Clark featuring Tanya Tucker	Alex Harvey; Larry Collins	Classic	2012	
"Delta Dawn"	Tanya Tucker	Alex Harvey; Larry Collins	While I'm Livin'	2019	
"Depend on You"	Tanya Tucker	Parker McGee	Lovin' and Learnin'	1976	
"Don't Believe My Heart Can Stand Another You"	Tanya Tucker	Billy Ray Reynolds	Lovin' and Learnin'	1976	
"Don't Believe My Heart Can Stand Another You"	Tanya Tucker	Billy Ray Reynolds	Greatest Hits Encore	1990	
"Don't Go Breaking My Heart"	Ty Herndon and Tanya Tucker	Elton John; Bernie Taupin	Gone Country: '70s Rock	2008	
"Don't Go Out"	Tanya Tucker featuring T. Graham Brown	Radney Foster; Bill Lloyd	Tennessee Woman	1990	
"Don't Let My Heart Be the Last to Know"	Tanya Tucker	Dennis Morgan; Billy Burnette	Can't Run from Yourself	1992	
"Don't You Want to Be a Lover Tonight"	Tanya Tucker	Sterling Whipple	Dreamlovers	1980	
"Down to My Last Teardrop"	Tanya Tucker	Paul Davis	What Do I Do with Me	1991	
"Dream Lover"	Tanya Tucker featuring Glen Campbell	Bobby Darin	Dreamlovers	1980	
"Embraceable You"	Frank Sinatra featuring Tanya Tucker	George Gershwin; Ira Gershwin	Duets: Twentieth Anniversary	2013	
"Everything That You Want"	Tanya Tucker	Randy Sharp; Jack Wesley Routh	What Do I Do with Me	1991	
"Feel Right"	Tanya Tucker	Larry Byrom	Changes	1982	
"Fire to Fire"	Tanya Tucker featuring Willie Nelson	Sharon Rice; Bill Rice; Mike Lawler	Fire to Fire	1995	
"Find Out What's Happenin'"	Tanya Tucker	Jerry Crutchfield	Fire to Fire	1995	
"Fool, Fool Heart"	Tanya Tucker	Rick Peoples; Roger Brown	Girls Like Me	1986	
"Forever Loving You"	Tanya Tucker	Tanya Tucker; Michael Lynn Rogers; Rusty Crowe	Non-album single	2017	
"Girls Like Me"	Tanya Tucker	Karen Brooks; Matraca Berg; Ronnie Samoset	Girls Like Me	1986	
"Going Nowhere and Gettin' There Fast"	Tanya Tucker	Andy Byrd; Wayne Knox	NASCAR: Hotter Than Asphalt	1996	
"Gonna Love You Anyway"	Tanya Tucker	Layng Martine, Jr.	Here's Some Love	1976	
"Good Ole Boys"	John Schneider featuring Tanya Tucker, Steve Wariner, John Conlee, T.G. Sheppard, Jo-el Sonnier, Mathew Nelson, Gunnar Nelson, Heidi Newfield, Bobby Bare, and T. Graham Brown	Waylon Jennings	The Odyssey: Vagabond	2018	
"Goodbye Baby"	Tanya Tucker	Paul Davis	Tennessee Woman	1990	
"Greener Than the Grass (We Laid On)"	Tanya Tucker	David Allan Coe	Non-album single	1975	
"Guess I'll Have to Love Him More"	Tanya Tucker	Billy Sherrill; Glenn Sutton	You Are So Beautiful	1977	
"Half the Moon"	Tanya Tucker	Hugh Prestwood	Can't Run from Yourself	1992	
"Halfway to Heaven"	Tanya Tucker	Jerry Goldstein; Guy Francis Peritore; Robert Evan Getter	Should I Do It	1981	
"Halfway to Heaven"	Tanya Tucker	Jerry Goldstein; Guy Francis Peritore; Robert Evan Getter	Live	1982	
"Hangin' In"	Tanya Tucker	Steve Bogard; Rick Giles	Soon	1993	
"Hard Luck"	Tanya Tucker	John C. "Pete" Bailey; David Lee Mitchell; Raymond L. Turner; Jerry Ontiberoz	While I'm Livin'	2019	
"He Was Just Leaving"	Tanya Tucker	Lisa Angelle; Walt Aldridge	What Do I Do with Me	1991	
"He's All I Got"	Tanya Tucker	Jerry Williams; Gary Bonds	Delta Dawn	1972	
"Heart to Heart Talk"	Bob Wills featuring Tanya Tucker	Lee Ross	Bob Wills: A Tribute to Bob's 100th Birthday	2005	
"Heartache #3"	Tanya Tucker	Joe Rainey	Should I Do It	1981	
"Heartache and a Half"	Tanya Tucker	Eddie Struzick; Deborah Allen; Rafe Van Hoy	Changes	1982	
"Heartbreak Hotel"	Tanya Tucker	Elvis Presley; Tommy Durden; Mae Axton	TNT	1978	
"Heartbreaker"	Tanya Tucker	Joe L. Wilson	Love Me Like You Used To	1987	
"Hello Mr. Sunshine"	Tanya Tucker	Veto Galati, Jr. Mick Stewart	Here's Some Love	1976	
"Here We Are"	Tanya Tucker	Curly Putman; Rafe Van Hoy	Lovin' and Learnin'	1976	
"Here's Some Love"	Tanya Tucker	Richard Mainegra; Jack Roberts	Here's Some Love	1976	
"Here's Some Love"	Tanya Tucker	Richard Mainegra; Jack Roberts	Greatest Hits Encore	1990	
"High Ridin' Heroes"	Tanya Tucker	David Lynn Jones	While I'm Livin'	2019	
"Highway Robbery"	Tanya Tucker	Michael Garvin; Bucky Jones; Tom Shapiro	Strong Enough to Bend	1988	
"Holding On"	Tanya Tucker	Rafe Van Hoy	Here's Some Love	1976	
"Hope You Find What You're Loving For"	Tanya Tucker	Dean Dillon; Hank Cochran	Love Me Like You Used To	1987	
"Horseshoe Bend"	Tanya Tucker	Mack Vickery; Bobby Borchers	What's Your Mama's Name	1973	
"How Can I Tell Him"	Tanya Tucker	Lobo	Would You Lay with Me (In a Field of Stone)	1974	
"I Believe the South Is Gonna Rise Again"	Tanya Tucker	Bobby Braddock	Would You Lay with Me (In a Field of Stone)	1974	
"I Bet She Knows"	Tanya Tucker	Paul Thorn; Billy Maddox	Fire to Fire	1995	
"I Can Do That"	Tanya Tucker	Jerry Laseter; Earl Clark; David Stewart	Tanya	2002	
"I Can Live Without You (But Not Very Long)"	Tanya Tucker	Jerry Laseter; Kerry Kurt Phillips	Tanya	2002	
"I Don't Believe That's How You Feel"	Tanya Tucker	Harlan Howard; Kostas	Complicated	1997	
"I Don't Owe You Anything"	Tanya Tucker	Brandi Carlile; Tim Hanseroth; Phil Hanseroth	While I'm Livin'	2019	
"I Don't Want You to Go"	Tanya Tucker	Bruce Roberts; Allee Willis	Changes	1982	
"I Left My Heart in San Francisco"	Tanya Tucker	George Cory; Douglas Cross	Tear Me Apart	1979	
"I Love the Way He Loves Me"	Tanya Tucker	D. Fuller; J. Cunningham	"Delta Dawn" B-side	1972	
"I Love You Anyway"	Tanya Tucker	Pat Terry	Soon	1993	
"I Loved You a Thousand Ways"	Tanya Tucker	Jim Beck; Lefty Frizzell	My Turn	2009	
"I Oughta' Let Go"	Tanya Tucker	Troy Seals; Steve Diamond; Eddie Setser	Should I Do It	1981	
"I Still Hear Your Voice"	Tanya Tucker	Gary Burr; Beth Hooker	Tanya	2002	
"I Still Sing the Old Songs"	Tanya Tucker	David Allan Coe	You Are So Beautiful	1977	
"I Won't Take Less Than Your Love"	Tanya Tucker featuring Paul Davis and Paul Overstreet	Paul Overstreet; Don Schlitz	Love Me Like You Used To	1987	
"I Wonder What He's Doing Tonight"	Tanya Tucker	John Jarrard; Gary Nicholson	Love Me Like You Used To	1987	
"I Use the Soap"	Tanya Tucker	David Gates	Here's Some Love	1976	
"I'll Be Your Lady"	Tanya Tucker	David Allan Coe	You Are So Beautiful	1977	
"I'll Come Back as Another Woman"	Tanya Tucker	Richard E. Carpenter; Kent Robbins	Girls Like Me	1986	
"I'll Take the Memories"	Tanya Tucker	Charlie Craig; Keith Stegall	Fire to Fire	1995	
"I'll Take Today"	Tanya Tucker	Kent Robbins; Will Robinson	Fire to Fire	1995	
"I'll Tennessee You in My Dreams"	Tanya Tucker	Paul Overstreet; Don Schlitz	Love Me Like You Used To	1987	
"I'm in Love and He's in Dallas"	Tanya Tucker	Kent Robbins; Richard Leigh	Tanya Tucker	1994	
"I'm Not Lisa"	Tanya Tucker	Jessi Colter	Tanya Tucker	1975	
"I'm So Lonesome I Could Cry"	Tanya Tucker	Hank Williams	Delta Dawn	1972	
"I'm the Singer, You're the Song"	Tanya Tucker	Tanya Tucker; Jerry Goldstein	TNT	1978	
"I've Got Somebody"	Tanya Tucker	Randy Goodrum	Dreamlovers	1980	
"I've Learned to Live"	Tanya Tucker	Dean Dillon; Frank Dycus	Can't Run from Yourself	1992	
"I've Never Said No Before"	Tanya Tucker	Mark Gray	Tear Me Apart	1979	
"If I Didn't Love You"	Tanya Tucker	Deborah Allen; Rafe Van Hoy	Love Me Like You Used To	1987	
"If It Don't Come Easy"	Tanya Tucker	Dave Gibson; Craig Karp	Love Me Like You Used To	1987	
"If You Feel It"	Tanya Tucker	Jerry Goldstein; Jimmy Ford	TNT	1978	
"If You Touch Me (You've Got to Love Me)"	Tanya Tucker	Carmol Taylor; Norro Wilson; Joe Stampley	Delta Dawn	1972	
"If Your Heart Ain't Busy Tonight"	Tanya Tucker	Tom Shapiro; Chris Waters	What Do I Do with Me	1991	
"Is Anybody Goin' to San Antone"	Tanya Tucker	Dave Kirby; Glenn Martin	My Turn	2009	
"It Was Always You"	Tanya Tucker	Bob McDill	Ridin' Rainbows	1977	
"It Hurts Like Love"	Tanya Tucker	Chuck Jones; Deborah Allen	Complicated	1997	
"It Wasn't God Who Made Honky Tonk Angels"	Hank Thompson featuring Kitty Wells and Tanya Tucker	J.D. Miller	Hank Thompson and Friends (Note: Recorded as a medley with "The Wild Side of Life" for Thompson's 1997 album, Hank Thompson and Friends.)	1997	
"It Won't Be Me"	Tanya Tucker	Tom Shapiro; Chris Waters	Tennessee Woman	1990	
"It's a Cowboy Lovin' Night"	Tanya Tucker	Ronnie Rogers	Ridin' Rainbows	1977	
"It's a Little Too Late"	Tanya Tucker	Pat Terry; Roger Murrah	Can't Run from Yourself	1992	
"It's Nice to Be with You"	Tanya Tucker	Jerry Goldstein	TNT	1978	
"It's Only Over for You"	Tanya Tucker	Mike Reid; Rory Bourke	Girls Like Me	1986	
"Just About Now"	Tanya Tucker	Gary Burr; Jon Vezner	Tanya Tucker	1994	
"Just Another Love"	Tanya Tucker	Paul Davis	Girls Like Me	1986	
"Knee Deep in Loving You"	Tanya Tucker	Sonny Throckmorton	Ridin' Rainbows	1977	
"Lay Back in the Arms of Someone"	Tanya Tucker	Nicky Chinn; Mike Chapman	Tear Me Apart	1979	
"Leave Him Alone"	Tanya Tucker	Bobby Braddock; Curly Putman	Lovin' and Learnin'	1976	
"Let It Snow! Let It Snow! Let It Snow!"	Tanya Tucker	Sammy Cahn; Jule Styne	Still Believing in Christmas	2006	
"Let Me Be There"	Tanya Tucker	John Rostill	Would You Lay with Me (In a Field of Stone)	1974	
"(Let Me Be Your) Teddy Bear"	Tanya Tucker	Kal Mann; Bernie Lowe	It's Now or Never: The Tribute to Elvis	1994	
"Let Me Count the Ways"	Tanya Tucker	Jerry Crutchfield; Claire Cloninger	Dreamlovers	1980	
"Let the Good Times Roll"	Tanya Tucker	Tony Martin; Reese Wilson	Soon	1993	
"Let's Keep It That Way"	Tanya Tucker	Rafe Van Hoy; Curly Putman	Ridin' Rainbows	1977	
"Little Things"	Tanya Tucker	Michael Dulaney; Steven Dale Jones	Complicated	1997	
"Livin' Proof Your Love Is Killin' Me"	Daryl Pillow featuring Tanya Tucker	J.B. Rudd; George Teren	Finally	2011	
"Lizzie and the Rainman"	Tanya Tucker	Kenny O'Dell; Larry Henley	Tanya Tucker	1975	
"Lonely at the Right Time"	Tanya Tucker	Frank J. Myers; Don Pfrimmer	Strong Enough to Bend	1988	
"Lonesome Town"	Tanya Tucker	Matraca Berg; Ronnie Samoset	Strong Enough to Bend	1988	
"Love Knows We Tried"	Tanya Tucker	Jan Crutchfield; Kerry Chater; Rory Bourke	Dreamlovers	1980	
"Love Me Like You Never Will Again"	Tanya Tucker	Billy Ray Reynolds; Eddie Fox	Ridin' Rainbows	1977	
"Love Me Like You Used To"	Tanya Tucker	Paul Davis; Bobby Emmons	Love Me Like You Used To	1987	
"Love of a Rolling Stone"	Tanya Tucker	Jerry Chesnut	Tanya Tucker	1975	
"Love Thing"	Tanya Tucker	Bill LaBounty; Delbert McClinton	Complicated	1997	
"Love Will"	Tanya Tucker	Byron Hill; Cyril Rawson	Fire to Fire	1995	
"Love's Gonna Live Here"	Tanya Tucker featuring Jim Lauderdale	Buck Owens	My Turn	2009	
"Love's the Answer"	Tanya Tucker	Emily Mitchell; Norro Wilson	Delta Dawn	1972	
"Lover Goodbye"	Tanya Tucker	Phil Everly; Joey Paige	TNT	1978	
"Lovesick Blues"	Tanya Tucker	Cliff Friend; Irving Mills	My Turn	2009	
"Lovin' Arms"	Tanya Tucker	Tom Jans	You Are So Beautiful	1977	
"Loving You Could Never Be Better"	Tanya Tucker	Earl Montgomery; Carl Montgomery; Betty Tate	Delta Dawn	1972	
"Lucky Enough for Two"	Tanya Tucker	Henry Gaffney	Should I Do It	1981	
"Makin' Love Don't Always Make Love Grow"	Tanya Tucker	Sterling Whipple	Lovin' and Learnin'	1976	
"Merry Christmas Wherever You Are"	Tanya Tucker	Mack Vickery; Jerry Laseter	Non-album single	2011	
"Mississippi"	Billy Don Burns featuring Tanya Tucker	Billy Don Burns; Hank Cochran	Heroes, Friends & Other Troubled Souls	2005	
"Mustang Ridge"	Tanya Tucker	Brandi Carlile; Tim Hanseroth; Phil Hanseroth	While I'm Livin'	2019	
"My Arms Stay Open All Night"	Tanya Tucker	Paul Overstreet; Don Schlitz	Greatest Hits	1989	
"My Cowboy's Getting Old"	Tanya Tucker	Mary Ann Duwe	Lovin' and Learnin'	1976	
"My Song"	Tanya Tucker featuring Glen Campbell	Steve Hardin	Dreamlovers	1980	
"New York City Song"	Tanya Tucker	Linda Hargrove	Delta Dawn	1972	
"No Man's Land"	Tanya Tucker	Don Wayne	Would You Lay with Me (In a Field of Stone)	1974	
"Nobody Dies from a Broken Heart"	Tanya Tucker	Randy Sharp; Sonny LeMaire	Fire to Fire	1995	
"Not Fade Away"	Tanya Tucker	Charles Hardin; Norman Petty	TNT	1978	
"Now We're Talking"	Tanya Tucker	Mike Reid; Wayland Holyfield	Tanya Tucker	1994	
"Oh Lonesome Me"	Tanya Tucker	Don Gibson	My Turn	2009	
"Oh What a Love"	Tanya Tucker	Jerry Laseter; Hank Cochran	Tanya	2002	
"Oh What It Did to Me"	Tanya Tucker	Jerry Crutchfield	Tennessee Woman	1990	
"Old Dan Tucker's Daughter"	Tanya Tucker	Curly Putman; Buddy Killen	Would You Lay with Me (In a Field of Stone)	1974	
"Old Weakness (Coming on Strong)"	Tanya Tucker	Gary Nicholson; Bob DiPiero	Tanya	2002	
"One Big Family"	Heart of Nashville (Note: Roy Acuff, Rex Allen, Jr., Lynn Anderson, Eddy Arnold, Chet Atkins, Bobby Bare, Lane Brody, T. Graham Brown, Little Jimmy Dickens, Karen Taylor-Good, Dobie Gray, Sonny James, George Jones, The Kendalls, Dave Kirby, Neal Matthews, Kathy Mattea, O.B. McClinton, Ronnie McDowell, Lorrie Morgan, Colleen Peterson, Boots Randolph, Jerry Reed, Jeannie C. Riley, Ronny Robbins, Ray Sawyer, Troy Seals, Jeannie Seely, Rick Schulman, Gordon Stoker, Tanya Tucker, Mack Vickery, Porter Wagoner, Duane West, Leona Williams, Bergen White, and Faron Young)	Ronnie McDowell; Mike Reid; Troy Seals	Non-album single	1985	
"One Love at a Time"	Tanya Tucker	Paul Davis; Paul Overstreet	Girls Like Me	1986	
"Over My Shoulder"	Tanya Tucker	Marcus Hummon; Roger Murrah	Tanya	2002	
"Pack Your Lies and Go"	Tanya Tucker	Alan Syms	While I'm Livin'	2019	
"Pass Me By"	Tanya Tucker	Hillman Hall	What's Your Mama's Name	1973	
"Pecos Promenade"	Tanya Tucker	Larry Collins; Sandy Pinkard; Snuff Garrett	Smokey and the Bandit 2	1980	
"Pecos Promenade"	Tanya Tucker	Larry Collins; Sandy Pinkard; Snuff Garrett	Live	1982	
"Pecos Promenade"	Tanya Tucker	Larry Collins; Sandy Pinkard; Snuff Garrett	Greatest Hits Encore	1990	
"Played the Game Too Long"	Billy Joe Shaver featuring Tanya Tucker	Hillman Hall; Billy Joe Shaver	Everybody's Brother	2007	
"Playing for Keeps"	Tanya Tucker	Lewis Anderson; Lisa Silver	Strong Enough to Bend	1988	
"Pride of Franklin County"	Tanya Tucker	Barbara Keith; Doug Tibbes	Lovin' and Learnin'	1976	
"Rainbow Rider"	Tanya Tucker	Bobby Fischer; Charlie Black; Austin Roberts	Can't Run from Yourself	1992	
"Rainy Girl"	Tanya Tucker	Tanya Tucker; Codye Hancock	What's Your Mama's Name	1973	
"Ramblin' Fever"	Tanya Tucker	Merle Haggard	My Turn	2009	
"Reggae Cowboy"	The Bellamy Brothers featuring Tanya Tucker and David Allan Coe	David Bellamy	Angels & Outlaws, Vol. 1	2005	
"Rich"	Tanya Tucker	Brandi Carlile; Tim Hanseroth; Phil Hanseroth	While I'm Livin'	2019	
"Ridin' Out the Heartache"	Tanya Tucker	Cathy Majeski; Sunny Russ; Stephony Smith	Complicated	1997	
"Ridin' Rainbows"	Tanya Tucker	Jan Crutchfield; Susan Pugh; Connie Ethridge	Ridin' Rainbows	1977	
"Right About Now"	Tanya Tucker	Rick Bowles; Jeff Silbar	What Do I Do with Me	1991	
"Rodeo Girls"	Tanya Tucker	Tanya Tucker; Joe Rainey	Should I Do It	1981	
"Rodeo Girls"	Tanya Tucker	Tanya Tucker; Joe Rainey	The Night the Lights Went Out in Georgia	1981	
"Romeo"	Dolly Parton featuring Billy Ray Cyrus, Tanya Tucker, Mary-Chapin Carpenter, Kathy Mattea, and Pam Tillis	Dolly Parton	Slow Dancing with the Moon	1993	
"Round and Round the Bottle"	Tanya Tucker	K. Susan Taylor	Here's Some Love	1976	
"Same Old Story"	Tanya Tucker	Tony Arata	Tanya Tucker	1994	
"San Antonio Stroll"	Tanya Tucker	Peter Noah	Tanya Tucker	1975	
"San Antonio Stroll"	Tanya Tucker	Peter Noah	Greatest Hits Encore	1990	
"San Francisco (Be Sure to Wear Some Flowers in Your Hair)"	Tanya Tucker	John Phillips	Tear Me Apart	1979	
"Save Me"	Tanya Tucker	Tanya Tucker; Jerry Goldstein	Non-album single	1978	
"Seminole Wind Calling"	Tanya Tucker	Brandi Carlile; Tim Hanseroth; Phil Hanseroth	While I'm Livin'	2019	
"Shame on the Moon"	Tanya Tucker	Rodney Crowell	Changes	1982	
"Shady Streets"	Tanya Tucker	Dickey Betts; Dan Toler; Billy Ray Reynolds	Tear Me Apart	1979	
"Short Cut"	Tanya Tucker	Lisa MacGregor; Alan Kroeber	Here's Some Love	1976	
"Shotgun"	Tanya Tucker	Michael Garvin; Tom Shapiro	Tennessee Woman	1990	
"Should I Do It"	Tanya Tucker	Layng Martine, Jr.	Should I Do It	1981	
"Should'a Thought About That"	Tanya Tucker	Tanya Tucker; Jerry Laseter; Kerry Kurt Phillips	Tanya	2002	
"Shoulder to Shoulder"	Glen Campbell featuring Tanya Tucker	Henry Gaffney	It's the World Gone Crazy (Note: This recording was also included on Tucker's 1981 album, Should I Do It.)	1981	
"Silence Is King"	Tanya Tucker	Gary Burr; Jim Photoglo	Soon	1993	
"Silent Night"	Tanya Tucker	Franz Xaver Gruber; Joseph Mohr	RFD Christmas	1981	
"Silver Bells"	Tanya Tucker	Jay Livingston; Ray Evans	Christmas Greetings, Vol. 5	1974	
"Sister's Coming Home"	Emmylou Harris with Tanya Tucker	Willie Nelson	Blue Kentucky Girl	1979	
"Slippin' Away"	Tanya Tucker	Jerry Goldstein; Jimmy Ford	"Save Me" B-side	1978	
"Smell the Flowers"	Tanya Tucker	Jerry Reed	Delta Dawn	1972	
"Sneaky Moon"	Tanya Tucker	Bill LaBounty	Soon	1993	
"Some Day My Prince Will Come"	Tanya Tucker	Frank Churchill; Larry Morey	The Best of Country Sing the Best of Disney	1996	
"Some Kind of Trouble"	Tanya Tucker	Mike Reid; Brent Maher; Don Potter	What Do I Do with Me	1991	
"Somebody (Trying to Tell You Something)"	Tanya Tucker	Joe Rainey; Jack Tempchin	Dreamlovers	1980	
"Somebody Buy This Cowgirl a Beer"	Tanya Tucker	Milton Brown; Stephen Dorff; Snuff Garrett	Live	1982	
"Somebody Must Have Loved You Right Last Night"	Tanya Tucker	Ken Bell	Tear Me Apart	1979	
"Somebody to Care"	Tanya Tucker	Bill Caswell; Alan Rhody	Girls Like Me	1986	
"Someday Soon"	Tanya Tucker	Ian Tyson	Tanya Tucker	1975	
"Somethin' Else"	Little Richard and Tanya Tucker	Eddie Cochran; Sharon Sheeley	Rhythm Country and Blues	1994	
"Something"	Tanya Tucker	George Harrison	Come Together: America Salutes the Beatles	1995	
"Son-of-a Preacher Man"	Tanya Tucker	Ronnie Wilkins; John Hurley	Tanya Tucker	1975	
"Song Man"	Tanya Tucker	Dallas Frazier; A.L. "Doodle" Owens	What's Your Mama's Name	1973	
"Soon"	Tanya Tucker	Casey Kelly; Bob Regan	Soon	1993	
"Soul Song"	Tanya Tucker	George Richey; Norro Wilson; Billy Sherrill	Delta Dawn	1972	
"Spring"	Tanya Tucker	John Tipton	You Are So Beautiful	1977	
"Still Hold On"	Tanya Tucker	Kim Carnes; Dave Ellingson; Wendy Waldman; Eric Kaz	Girls Like Me	1986	
"Stormy Weather"	Tanya Tucker	Leo Sayer; Tom Snow	Should I Do It	1981	
"Strong Enough to Bend"	Tanya Tucker	Beth Nielsen Chapman; Don Schlitz	Strong Enough to Bend	1988	
"Take Another Run"	Tanya Tucker	Paul Overstreet; Don Schlitz	Tennessee Woman	1990	
"Take Me Back to Tulsa"	Bob Wills featuring Porter Wagoner, Terry Bradshaw, and Tanya Tucker	Tommy Duncan; James Robert Wills	Bob Wills: A Tribute to Bob's 100th Birthday	2005	
"Take Me to Heaven"	Tanya Tucker	Richard Mainegra; K. Susan Taylor	Here's Some Love	1976	
"Teach Me the Words to Your Song"	Tanya Tucker	Rory Michael Bourke; Gayle Barnhill	What's Your Mama's Name	1973	
"Tear Me Apart"	Tanya Tucker	Nicky Chinn; Mike Chapman	Tear Me Apart	1979	
"Teddy Bear Song"	Tanya Tucker	Don Earl; Nick Nixon	What's Your Mama's Name	1973	
"Tell Me About It"	Tanya Tucker featuring Delbert McClinton	Bill LaBounty; Pat McLaughlin	Can't Run from Yourself	1992	
"Temporarily Blue"	Tanya Tucker	Tommy Rocco; John Schweers; Charlie Black	Love Me Like You Used To	1987	
"Tennessee Woman"	Tanya Tucker	Jimmy Webb	Dreamlovers	1980	
"Texas (When I Die)"	Tanya Tucker	Ed Bruce; Patsy Bruce; Bobby Borchers	TNT	1978	
"Texas (When I Die)"	Tanya Tucker	Ed Bruce; Patsy Bruce; Bobby Borchers	Live	1982	
"Texas (When I Die)"	Tanya Tucker	Ed Bruce; Patsy Bruce; Bobby Borchers	Greatest Hits Encore	1990	
"Texas (When I Die)"	Mary Sarah featuring Tanya Tucker	Ed Bruce; Patsy Bruce; Bobby Borchers	Bridges	2014	
"The Baptism of Jesse Taylor"	Tanya Tucker	Dallas Frazier; Sanger D. Shafer	Would You Lay with Me (In a Field of Stone)	1974	
"The Chokin' Kind"	Tanya Tucker	Harlan Howard	What's Your Mama's Name	1973	
"The Day My Heart Goes Still"	Tanya Tucker	Brandi Carlile; Tim Hanseroth; Phil Hanseroth	While I'm Livin'	2019	
"The Gospel Singer"	Tanya Tucker	Tony Joe White	Here's Some Love	1976	
"The Happiest Girl in the Whole U.S.A."	Tanya Tucker	Donna Fargo	Delta Dawn	1972	
"The House That Built Me"	Tanya Tucker	Tom Douglas; Allen Shamblin	While I'm Livin'	2019	
"The Jamestown Ferry"	Tanya Tucker	Mack Vickery; Bobby Borchers	Delta Dawn	1972	
"The Jamestown Ferry"	Tanya Tucker	Mack Vickery; Bobby Borchers	Live	1982	
"The Jamestown Ferry"	Tanya Tucker	Mack Vickery; Bobby Borchers	Greatest Hits Encore	1990	
"The King of Country Music"	Tanya Tucker	Steve Dorff; Milton L. Brown	Tanya Tucker	1975	
"The Love You Gave to Me"	Tanya Tucker	Gary Nicholson; Delbert McClinton	Fire to Fire	1995	
"The Man That Turned My Mama On"	Tanya Tucker	Ed Bruce	Would You Lay with Me (In a Field of Stone)	1974	
"The Memories We Still Haven't Made"	Tanya Tucker	Thom Schuyler	Tanya Tucker	1994	
"The Missing Piece of Puzzle"	Tanya Tucker	Mark Sherrill; Leon Sherrill	What's Your Mama's Name	1973	
"The Night the Lights Went Out in Georgia"	Tanya Tucker	Bobby Russell	The Night the Lights Went Out in Georgia	1981	
"The Night They Drove Old Dixie Down"	Tanya Tucker	J. Robbie Robertson	Live	1982	
"The River and the Wind"	Tanya Tucker	Jim Weatherly	TNT	1978	
"The Rough Crowd"	Gary Chapman featuring Tanya Tucker and John Rich	Brandon Kinney; Jeremy Spillman	The Truth	2013	
"The Serenade That We Played"	Tanya Tucker	Lenny Roberts; Lindsay Harrison	Tanya Tucker	1975	
"The Thunder Rolls"	Tanya Tucker	Garth Brooks; Pat Alger	Tanya Tucker	1994	
"The Wheels of Laredo"	Tanya Tucker	Brandi Carlile; Tim Hanseroth; Phil Hanseroth	While I'm Livin'	2019	
"The Wild Side of Life"	Hank Thompson featuring Kitty Wells and Tanya Tucker	Arlie Carter; William Warren	Hank Thompson and Friends (Note: Recorded as a medley with "It Wasn't God Who Made Honky Tonk Angels" for Thompson's 1997 album, Hank Thompson and Friends.)	1997	
"The Winner's Game"	Tanya Tucker	Brandi Carlile; Tim Hanseroth; Phil Hanseroth	While I'm Livin'	2019	
"The Wonder"	Tanya Tucker	Gunn; Martin	Christmas for the '90s, Vol. 3	1995	
"There Is a Place"	Tanya Tucker	Sharon L. Rucker; Kinky Friedman	You Are So Beautiful	1977	
"There's a Tennessee Woman / Ben's Song"	Tanya Tucker	Tanya Tucker; Gary Stewart	Tennessee Woman	1990	
"This Heart of Mine"	Tanya Tucker	John Jarvis; Don Cook	"Walking Shoes" B-side	1990	
"Time and Distance"	Tanya Tucker	Donny Lowery; Randy Sharp	What Do I Do with Me	1991	
"Too Long"	Tanya Tucker	Mike Donovan	Changes	1982	
"Trail of Tears"	Tanya Tucker	Paul Kennerley	What Do I Do with Me	1991	
"Traveling Salesman"	Tanya Tucker	Gloria Sklerov; Harry Lloyd	Tanya Tucker	1975	
"Two Sparrows in a Hurricane"	Tanya Tucker	Mark Alan Springer	Can't Run from Yourself	1992	
"Until You're Mine"	Tanya Tucker	Thom Schuyler; Billy Walker; David Malloy	Changes	1982	
"Wait 'Til Daddy Finds Out"	Tanya Tucker	Dave Loggins	Ridin' Rainbows	1977	
"Waitin' for the Sun"	Tanya Tucker	Monty Criswell; Roger Murrah	Tanya	2002	
"Walk Through This World with Me"	Tanya Tucker	Sandy Seamons; Katy Savage	My Turn	2009	
"Walking Shoes"	Tanya Tucker	Paul Kennerley	Tennessee Woman	1990	
"We Don't Have to Do This"	Tanya Tucker	Gary Burr; Victoria Shaw	Soon	1993	
"We Had It All"	Tanya Tucker	Jerry Laseter; Kerry Kurt Phillips	Tanya	2002	
"We're Playing Games Again"	Tanya Tucker	Richard Kerr; Troy Seals	Should I Do It	1981	
"What Child Is This?"	Tanya Tucker	William Chatterton Dix	Christmas for the '90s, Vol. 2	1990	
"What Do They Know"	Tanya Tucker	Richard Ross; Donny Kees	Can't Run from Yourself	1992	
"What If We Were Running Out of Love"	Tanya Tucker	Linda Hargrove	Would You Lay with Me (In a Field of Stone)	1974	
"What Your Love Does for Me"	Tanya Tucker	Austin Cunningham; Sunny Russ	Complicated	1997	
"What's Your Mama's Name"	Tanya Tucker	Earl Montgomery; Dallas Frazier	What's Your Mama's Name	1973	
"What's Your Mama's Name"	Tanya Tucker	Earl Montgomery; Dallas Frazier	Live	1982	
"What's Your Mama's Name"	Tanya Tucker	Earl Montgomery; Dallas Frazier	Greatest Hits Encore	1990	
"When Will I Be Loved"	Tanya Tucker	Phil Everly	Tanya Tucker	1975	
"White Rocket"	Tanya Tucker	Rafe Van Hoy	Ridin' Rainbows	1977	
"Window Up Above"	Tanya Tucker	George Jones	God's Country: George Jones and Friends	2006	
"Why Don't We Just Sleep on It Tonight"	Glen Campbell featuring Tanya Tucker	John Lewis Parker; Harry Shannon	It's the World Gone Crazy	1981	
"Why Me, Lord"	Tanya Tucker	Kris Kristofferson	Would You Lay with Me (In a Field of Stone)	1974	
"Wine Me Up"	Tanya Tucker	Bill Deaton; Faron Young	My Turn	2009	
"Wings"	Tanya Tucker	Jan Crutchfield; Gary Baker	Ridin' Rainbows	1977	
"Winter Wonderland"	Tanya Tucker	Felix Bernard; Richard B. Smith	Christmas for the '90s, Vol. 1	1990	
"Wishin' It All Away"	Tanya Tucker	Amanda Hunt-Taylor; Michael Lunn	Complicated	1997	
"(Without You) What Do I Do with Me"	Tanya Tucker	Royce Porter; L. David Lewis; David Chamberlain	What Do I Do with Me	1991	
"Would You Lay with Me (In a Field of Stone)"	Tanya Tucker	David Allan Coe	Would You Lay with Me (In a Field of Stone)	1974	
"Would You Lay with Me (In a Field of Stone)"	Tanya Tucker	David Allan Coe	Live	1982	
"Would You Lay with Me (In a Field of Stone)"	Tanya Tucker	David Allan Coe	Greatest Hits Encore	1990	
"You Are So Beautiful"	Tanya Tucker	Billy Preston; Bruce Fisher	You Are So Beautiful	1977	
"You Better Hope You Die Young"	Hellbound Glory featuring Tanya Tucker	Leroy Virgil	Pinball (Junkie Edition)	2018	
"You Could Change My Mind"	Tanya Tucker	Lewis Anderson	Girls Like Me	1986	
"You Don't Do It"	Tanya Tucker	Al Anderson; Troy Seals	Complicated	1997	
"You Don't Have to Say You Love Me"	Tanya Tucker	Pino Donaggio; Vito Pallavicini; Vicki Wickham; Simon Napier-Bell	Should I Do It	1981	
"You Don't Know Me"	Tanya Tucker	Cindy Walker; Eddy Arnold	My Turn	2009	
"You Just Loved the Leavin' Out of Me"	Tanya Tucker	Linda Hargrove	Here's Some Love	1976	
"You Just Watch Me"	Tanya Tucker	Rick Giles; Bob Regan	Soon	1993	
"You Know Just What I'd Do"	Tanya Tucker	Jerry Foster; Bill Rice	You Are So Beautiful	1977	
"You'll Never Take the Texas Out of Me"	Tanya Tucker and Big Bird	Dennis Scott	Sesame Street: Sesame Country	1981	
"You're Not Alone"	Tanya Tucker	Tom Shapiro; Chris Waters	Strong Enough to Bend	1988	
"You've Got Me to Hold On To"	Tanya Tucker	Dave Loggins	Lovin' and Learnin'	1976	
"Your Love Amazes Me"	Tanya Tucker	Amanda Hunt; Chuck Jones	Tanya Tucker	1994	
"Your Old Magic"	Tanya Tucker	Tony Martin; Troy Martin	Tennessee Woman	1990	
