= Greatest Hits 1990–1992 =

Greatest hits album by Tanya Tucker
- Released: April 20, 1993
- Genre: Country
- Length: 32:30
- Label: Liberty
- Producer: Jerry Crutchfield

Tanya Tucker chronology
Can't Run from Yourself (1992)	Greatest Hits 1990–1992 (1993)	Soon (1993)

Professional ratings
Review scores
Source	Rating
Allmusic	4.5/5 stars

Greatest Hits 1990–1992 is a compilation album by American country music artist Tanya Tucker. It was released by Liberty Records in April 1993, containing most of the singles from Tennessee Woman, What Do I Do with Me and Can't Run from Yourself (the Top 10 hit single "Tell Me About It" was omitted). No new material was recorded for the project. The album peaked at number 15 on the Top Country Albums chart and number 65 on the Billboard 200 and was certified Platinum by the RIAA.

== Track listing ==
No.	Title	Writer(s)	Original album	Length
1.	"It's a Little Too Late"	Pat Terry, Roger Murrah	Can't Run from Yourself (1992)	2:39
2.	"Some Kind of Trouble"	Mike Reid, Brent Maher, Don Potter	What Do I Do with Me (1991)	3:52
3.	"(Without You) What Do I Do with Me"	Royce Porter, Lemuel David Lewis, David Chamberlain	What Do I Do with Me	2:56
4.	"Down to My Last Teardrop"	Paul Davis	What Do I Do with Me	3:29
5.	"Don't Go Out" (duet with T. Graham Brown)	Radney Foster, Bill Lloyd	Tennessee Woman (1990)	3:15
6.	"Walking Shoes"	Paul Kennerley	Tennessee Woman	2:39
7.	"Oh What It Did to Me"	Jerry Crutchfield	Tennessee Woman	3:31
8.	"Two Sparrows in a Hurricane"	Mark Alan Springer	Can't Run from Yourself	4:10
9.	"If Your Heart Ain't Busy Tonight"	Tom Shapiro, Chris Waters	What Do I Do with Me	3:03
10.	"It Won't Be Me"	Shapiro, Waters	Tennessee Woman	2:56
Total length:				32:30

== Chart performance ==
Chart (1993)	Peak position
U.S. Billboard Top Country Albums	15
U.S. Billboard 200	65
