= 28th Academy of Country Music Awards =

US music awards ceremony in 1993

- Date: May 11, 1993
- Location: Universal Amphitheatre, Los Angeles, California
- Hosted by: George Strait; Randy Owen; Reba McEntire

Highlights
- Most wins: Brooks & Dunn (3)
- Most nominations: Garth Brooks; Billy Ray Cyrus; Mary Chapin Carpenter; Tanya Tucker; Brooks & Dunn (4 each)

Television/radio coverage
- Network: NBC

The 28th Academy of Country Music Awards was held on May 11, 1993, at the Universal Amphitheatre, in Los Angeles, California . The ceremony was hosted by George Strait, Randy Owen, and Reba McEntire.

== Winners and nominees ==
Winners are shown in bold.

Entertainer of the Year	Album of the Year
**Garth Brooks**; Billy Ray Cyrus; Alan Jackson; Reba McEntire; Travis Tritt	**Brand New Man — Brooks & Dunn**; Come On Come On — Mary Chapin Carpenter; Some Gave All — Billy Ray Cyrus; The Chase — Garth Brooks; Wynonna — Wynonna
Top Female Vocalist of the Year	Top Male Vocalist of the Year
**Mary Chapin Carpenter**; Lorrie Morgan; Pam Tillis; Tanya Tucker; Wynonna	**Vince Gill**; Garth Brooks; Billy Dean; Alan Jackson; Doug Stone
Top Vocal Group of the Year	Top Vocal Duo of the Year
**Diamond Rio**; Alabama; Little Texas; McBride & the Ride; Restless Heart; Sawyer Brown	**Brooks & Dunn**; Mary Chapin Carpenter and Joe Diffie; Chris LeDoux and Garth Brooks; Patty Loveless and Dwight Yoakam; Travis Tritt and Marty Stuart
Single Record of the Year	Song of the Year
**"Boot Scootin' Boogie"** — **Brooks & Dunn**; "Achy Breaky Heart" — Billy Ray Cyrus; "Love, Me" — Collin Raye; "Straight Tequila Night" — John Anderson; "Two Sparrows in a Hurricane" — Tanya Tucker	"**I Still Believe in You**" — **Vince Gill, John Barlow Jarvis**; "Boot Scootin' Boogie" — Ronnie Dunn; "I Feel Lucky" — Mary Chapin Carpenter, Don Schlitz; "Something in Red" — Angela Kaset; "Two Sparrows in a Hurricane" — Mark Alan Springer
Top New Male Vocalist	Top New Female Vocalist
**Tracy Lawrence**; Billy Ray Cyrus; Collin Raye	**Michelle Wright**; Martina McBride; Joy Lynn White
Top New Vocal Duo or Group	Video of the Year
**Confederate Railroad**; Great Plains; Little Texas	**"Two Sparrows in a Hurricane"** — **Tanya Tucker**; "Don't Let Our Love Start Slippin' Away" — Vince Gill; "Lord Have Mercy on the Working Man" — Travis Tritt; "Take It Back" — Reba McEntire; "The Night the Lights Went Out in Georgia" — Reba McEntire
Pioneer Award
**George Jones**
Tex Ritter Award
**Pure Country**

== Performers ==
Performer(s)	Song(s)
Vince Gill	"One More Last Chance"
Brooks & Dunn	"Hard Workin' Man"
Wynonna	"Rock Bottom"
Martina McBride; Joy Lynn White; Michelle Wright	Top New Female Vocalist Medley "The Time Has Come" "True Confessions" "Take It Like a Man"
George Strait	"When Did You Stop Loving Me"
Mary Chapin Carpenter	"The Hard Way"
Alan Jackson	"Chattahoochee"
Garth Brooks	"That Summer"
Billy Ray Cyrus; Tracy Lawrence; Collin Raye	Top New Male Vocalist Medley "Some Gave All" "Alibis" "That Was a River"
Reba McEntire	"It's Your Call"
Tanya Tucker; Delbert McClinton	"Tell Me About It"
Travis Tritt	"T-R-O-U-B-L-E"
Doug Stone; Patty Loveless	Conway and Loretta Tribute "It's Only Make Believe" "Coal Miner's Daughter" "Louisiana Woman, Mississippi Man"
Alabama	"I'm in a Hurry (And Don't Know Why)"
Confederate Railroad; Great Plains; Little Texas	Top New Vocal Duo or Group Medley "Queen of Memphis" "Faster Gun" "What Might Have Been"
Lorrie Morgan	"I Guess You Had to Be There"
Billy Dean; Suzy Bogguss	"Pay Attention"/"Something Up My Sleeve"
John Anderson	"Money in the Bank"
George Jones; ACM Cast	"The Race Is On"

== Presenters ==
Presenter(s)	Notes
Hal Ketchum; Lisa Hartman Black	Single Record of the Year
Sammy Kershaw; Restless Heart	Top New Female Vocalist
Lee Horsley	Presents Tex Ritter Award to Pure Country
Pam Tillis; Larry Stewart	Top Vocal Duo of the Year
Kathy Mattea; James Brolin	Video of the Year
Shelby Lynne; Ralph Emery; Trisha Yearwood	Top New Male Vocalist
Chris LeDoux; Marie Osmond; Mark Chesnutt	Album of the Year
Dan Seals; Lorianne Crook; Charlie Chase	Song of the Year
Garth Brooks	Presented Pioneer Award to George Jones
McBride & the Ride; Joe Diffie	Top Female Vocalist of the Year
Diamond Rio	Top New Vocal Duo or Group
Buck Owens; Aaron Tippin	Top Vocal Group of the Year
Charlie Daniels; Leanza Cornett	Top Male Vocalist of the Year
Troy Aikman; Cybill Shepherd	Entertainer of the Year
