= List of Olympic songs and anthems =

Olympic songs and anthems are adopted officially by International Olympic Committee (or by official broadcasters and partners selected by IOC), to be used prior to the Olympic Games and to accompany the games during the event.

They are used as theme music in TV broadcast and also used in advertising campaigns for the Olympic Games. Some songs and anthems are more popular and famous than official songs and anthems.

== Summer Olympics ==
=== Official theme songs and anthems ===
Games	Host City	Title	Language(s)	Performer(s)	Writer(s) and producer(s)	Audio and Videos	Live Performance
1896	Athens	"Olympic Hymn"	Greek	Spyridon Samaras (conductor)	Spyridon Samaras (music); Kostis Palamas (lyrics)		
1932	Los Angeles	"Olympic Hymn"	English		Walter Bradley Keeler (music); Louis Benson (lyrics)		
1936	Berlin	"Olympische Hymne"	German	Richard Strauss (conductor), Berlin Philharmonic, the National Socialist Symphony Orchestra	Richard Strauss (music); Robert Lubahn (lyrics)		
1948	London	"Olympic Hymn (Non nobis Domine)"	English	Malcolm Sargent (conductor)	Roger Quilter (music); Rudyard Kipling (lyrics)		
1952	Helsinki	"Olympiahymni" (Olympic Hymn)	Finnish	Matti Turunen (conductor)	Jaakko Linjama (music); Toivo Lyy (lyrics)		
1952	Helsinki	"Olympiafanfaari" (Olympic Fanfare)	Instrumental		Aarre Merikanto		
1976	Montreal	"Bienvenue à Montréal" (Welcome to Montreal)	French	René Simard	Claude Lacombe, René Simard, Vic Vogel	Music Video	
1980	Moscow	"Festive Overture"	Instrumental		Dmitri Shostakovich		
1980	Moscow	"Олимпиада-80" (Olympiad 80)	Russian	Tõnis Mägi, Mykola Hnatyuk	David Tukhmanov, Robert Rozhdestvensky	Music Video; Music Video	
1980	Moscow	"Стадион моей мечты" (My Dream Stadium)	Russian	Muslim Magomayev		Music Video	
1984	Los Angeles	"Reach Out" (official song, also used as track theme)	English	Paul Engemann	Giorgio Moroder	Official Music Video	
1984	Los Angeles	"Olympic Fanfare and Theme" (official theme)	Instrumental	New American Orchestra	John Williams		Opening Ceremony
1988	Seoul	"Hand in Hand": English Version	English	Koreana	Giorgio Moroder, Tom Whitlock (English lyrics), Kim Moon-hwan (Korean lyrics)	Official Music Video	Opening Ceremony
1988	Seoul	"손에 손 잡고": Korean Version	Korean	Koreana	Giorgio Moroder, Tom Whitlock (English lyrics), Kim Moon-hwan (Korean lyrics)	Music Video	Opening Ceremony
1992	Barcelona	"Canto Olympico"	Greek	The Greek Radio Symphonic Orchestra, the Greek Radio Chorus	Mikis Theodorakis		
1992	Barcelona	"Amigos Para Siempre" (Friends for Life)	English and Spanish	José Carreras, Sarah Brightman	Andrew Lloyd Webber	Official Music Video	Closing Ceremony
1996	Atlanta	"Reach" (official song)	English	Gloria Estefan	Gloria Estefan, Diane Warren	Official Music Video	Closing Ceremony
1996	Atlanta	"Summon the Heroes" (official theme)	Instrumental	Atlanta Symphony	John Williams		Opening Ceremony
2000	Sydney	"Dare To Dream"	English	Olivia Newton-John, John Farnham	Paul Begaud, Vanessa Corish, Wayne Tester	Audio	Opening Ceremony
2004	Athens	"Oceania"	English	Björk	Björk, Sjón	Official Music Video	Opening Ceremony
2008	Beijing	"You and Me"	Chinese and English	Liu Huan, Sarah Brightman	Qigang Chen	Official Music Video; Music Video	
2012	London	"Survival"	English	Muse	Matt Bellamy		Closing Ceremony
2012	London	"Good Life"	English	Delphic	James Cook, Matt Cocksedge, Richard Boardman		
2016	Rio de Janeiro	"Alma e Coração" (Soul and Heart)	Portuguese	Thiaguinho, Projota		Music Video	
2020	Tokyo	"Colorful"	Japanese	Ai, Motohiro Hata, Little Glee Monster, Daichi Miura, Perfume, Taemin, Miyavi, Nasty C, Sabrina Carpenter, Ayumu Imazu, Blue Vintage, Mizki, Sanari, Chikuzen Sato	Ryosuke Imai	Music Video	
2024	Paris	"Parade" (official theme)	Instrumental	Orchestre National de France	Victor Le Masne	Audio	Live Performance
2024	Paris	"Hello World" (official song)	English	Gwen Stefani, Anderson .Paak	Ryan Tedder	Official Music Video	

=== Medal ceremony theme songs ===
Games	Host City	Title	Peformers	Writer(s) and producer(s)
2012	London	"Chariots Of Fire"	N/A	Vangelis
2012	London	"Medal Ceremony" (during closing ceremony)	N/A	David Arnold
2016	Rio de Janeiro	"Brazilian Fantasy"	N/A	Alexandre de Faria
2020	Tokyo	"Tokyo 2020 Victory Ceremony Theme"	144 people from top Japanese studio musicians and leading symphony orchestras - Recorded Version	Naoki Sato
2020	Tokyo	"Tokyo 2020 Victory Ceremony Theme"	Tokyo Metropolitan Symphony Orchestra and Tokyo Symphony Chorus - Live Version	Naoki Sato
2024	Paris	"Parade"	Orchestre National de France	Victor Le Masne

=== Other notable songs and anthems ===
Games	Host City	Title	Language(s)	Performer(s)	Writer(s) and producer(s)	Audio and Videos	Live Performance
1928	Amsterdam	"Olympiademarsch"	Dutch	Kees Pruis	James Klein and Franz Doelle (music), Kees Pruis (lyrics)		
1928	Amsterdam	"Op ter Olympiade"	Dutch	Duo Hofmann	Gerrit van Weezel (music); Joh. P. Koppen (lyrics)		
1964	Tokyo	"Olympic Games"	Instrumental	Ken Lean	André Popp		
1964	Tokyo	"Tokyo Melody": BBC broadcast Theme song	Instrumental	Helmut Zacharias	Helmut Zacharias		
1964	Tokyo	"The Olympics Song"		Kyu Sakamoto	T. Miyata, M. Koga		
1968	Mexico City	"Mexico Melody": BBC broadcast Theme song	Instrumental	Helmut Zacharias	Helmut Zacharias		
1976	Montréal	"Vive les Jeux Olympiques"	French	Serge Laprade	Pierre Sauvil		
1980	Moscow	"Ода Доброму Вестнику" ("Ode To The Bearer Of Good News")	Russian	Eduard Artemyev (synths), Gennadiy Trofimov (vocals), Boomerang, Melody (choir)	Eduard Artemyev		
1980	Moscow	"Olympic Games"	English	Miguel Bosé	Miguel Bosé, Steve Kipner, Toto Cutugno		
1980	Moscow	"Do Your Best": Planned theme song for the Japanese teams	Japanese, English	Pink Lady	Shunichi Tokura, Shizuka Ijūin		
1988	Seoul	"One Moment in Time": NBC Sports Broadcast Theme Song	English	Whitney Houston	Albert Hammond	Official Music Video	
1988	Seoul	"The Olympic Spirit": NBC Sports Broadcast Theme Music	Instrumental	John Williams	John Williams		
1988	Seoul	"You're Not Alone": Australian Official Olympic Team Song	English	Australian Olympians	Rob Hirst, Angry Anderson, Bernie Lynch, Mal Logan, John Schumann	Official Music Video	
1988	Seoul	"Korea"	English	Leslie Mandoki and Eva Sun	Leslie Mandoki, László Bencker		
1988	Seoul	"Heart and Soul": NHK Broadcast Theme Song	Japanese, English	Mari Hamada	Hiroyuki Ohtsuki, Mari Hamada		
1988	Seoul	"Go For Gold": ARD Broadcast Theme Song	English	The Winners	Thomas Hen, Detlef Reshöft, Timothy Touchton		
1992	Barcelona	"Barcelona": Official Theme Song Candidate; BBC Grandstand Theme Song	English and Spanish	Freddie Mercury and Montserrat Caballé	Freddie Mercury, Mike Moran		
1992	Barcelona	"Go For Gold in Barcelona"	English	The Winners	Thomas Hen, Detlef Reshöft, Timothy Touchton		
1996	Atlanta	"The Power of the Dream"	English	Celine Dion	Kenneth Brian Edmonds, David Walter Foster, Linda Diane Thompson		Opening Ceremony
1996	Atlanta	"Return to Innocence": Promotional Video Theme Song	English, Amis	Enigma	Michael Cretu, Kuo Ying-nan, Kuo Hsiu-chu	Music Video	
1996	Atlanta	"Javelin": Official Bid Theme	Instrumental	Atlanta Symphony Orchestra	Michael Torke	Audio	
1996	Atlanta	"Tara's Theme": BBC broadcast Theme song	Instrumental	Steve Spiro & Paul Wickens	Max Steiner		
1996	Atlanta	"Someone Somewhere in Summertime": NOS broadcast Theme song	English	Simple Minds	Charlie Burchill, Derek Forbes, Jim Kerr, Michael MacNeil		
2000	Sydney	"The Flame"	English	Tina Arena	John Foreman	Official Music Video Audio	Opening Ceremony
2000	Sydney	"Heroes Live Forever"	English	Vanessa Amorosi	John Gillard & Trevor White	Audio	Opening Ceremony
2000	Sydney	"Under Southern Skies"	English	Nikki Webster & Sing 2001 Choir	Damien Halloran & Maria Millward	Audio	Opening Ceremony
2000	Sydney	"Sui riku sora, mugendai": Japanese Official Olympic Team Song	Japanese	19	Kenji Okahira and Keigo Iwase		
2004	Athens	"Good Enough": NOS broadcast Theme song	English	Dodgy	Nigel Clark, Mathew Priest, Andy Miller		
2004	Athens	"Yume ga Chikara": Japanese Official Olympic Team Song	Japanese	Kokia	Kokia		
2008	Beijing	"Forever Friends"	Chinese, English	Sun Nan, A-Mei, Coco Lee	Giorgio Moroder	Official Music Video	
2008	Beijing	"Love Love Love": NOS broadcast Theme song	Chinese	Jolin Tsai	Konstantin Meladze	Official Music Video	
2012	London	"Proud": Official Bid Theme	English	Heather Small	Heather Small, Peter-John Vettese		
2012	London	"Anywhere in the World": part of Coca-Cola's Move to the Beat campaign	English	Mark Ronson and Katy B	Mark Ronson, Katy B, Gordon Warren		
2012	London	"Spinnin' for 2012": Torch Relay Promotional Song	English	Dionne Bromfield and Tinchy Stryder	Dionne Bromfield, Kwasi Danquah III, Corynne Elliott		
2012	London	"First Steps": BBC broadcast Theme song	English	Elbow	Guy Garvey, Elbow		
2012	London	"Sky on Fire": NOS broadcast Theme song	English	Handsome Poets	Erik Schurman, Tim van Esch, Daniel Smit, Nils Davidse, Semimo		
2016	Rio de Janeiro	"Rise": NBC Sports Broadcast Theme Song	English	Katy Perry	Katy Perry, Max Martin, Savan Kotecha, Ali Payami	Official Music Video	
2016	Rio de Janeiro	"Shadow Wind": NOS broadcast Theme song	English	Dotan	Dotan Harpenau, Mark Van Bruggen, William Douglas Burr Knox		
2016	Rio de Janeiro	"Where I'll Stay": Australian Official Olympic Team Song	English	Jessica Mauboy	Jessica Mauboy, David Musumeci, Anthony Egizii, Sarah Aarons, R. Pym		
2020	Tokyo	"Remember This": NBC Sports Broadcast Theme Song	English	Jonas Brothers	Nicholas Jonas, Kevin Jonas II, Ryan Tedder, Jordan K. Johnson, Stefan Johnson, Oliver Peterhof, Michael Pollack, Casey Smith	Official Music Video	
2020	Tokyo	"Big in Japan": NOS broadcast Theme song	English	Alphaville	Marian Gold, Bernhard Lloyd, Frank Mertens		
2020	Tokyo	"Kite": NHK Broadcast Theme Song	Japanese	Arashi	Kenshi Yonezu		
2024	Paris	"Butai ni Tatte": NHK Broadcast Theme Song	Japanese	Yoasobi	Ayase	Official Music Video	
2024	Paris	"I Believe": NOS broadcast Theme song	English	Douwe Bob	Gordon Groothedde, Douwe Bob Posthuma, Stijn van Dalen		

== Winter Olympics ==
=== Official theme songs and anthems ===
Games	Host City	Title	Language(s)	Performer(s)	Writer(s) and producer(s)	Audio and Videos	Live Performance
1976	Innsbruck	"Schneeplattler"	German	Sonnenweiberl und Schneemandl	Othmar Elsässer, Walter Pötsch		
1980	Lake Placid	"Give It All You Got"	Instrumental	Chuck Mangione	Chuck Mangione		
1984	Sarajevo	"Just a Dream Away"	English	John Denver	Michael Miller, Monica Riordan		
1988	Calgary	"Winter Games": Instrumental Version	None (Instrumental)	David Foster	David Foster	Official Music Video	Opening Ceremony; Closing Ceremony
1988	Calgary	"Can't You Feel It": Vocal Version	English		David Foster	Audio	Opening Ceremony; Closing Ceremony
1992	Albertville	N/A					
1994	Lillehammer	"Se ilden lyse (Fire in Your Heart)"	Norwegian (English)	Sissel Kyrkjebø, English duet with Plácido Domingo	Jan Vincents Johannessen, Svein Gundersen		
1998	Nagano	N/A					
2002	Salt Lake City	"Light the Fire Within" (official song)	English	LeAnn Rimes	David Foster, Linda Thompson		Opening Ceremony
2002	Salt Lake City	"Call of the Champions" (official theme)	Latin	Utah Symphony, Tabernacle Choir	John Williams		Opening Ceremony
2006	Turin	"Because We Believe (Ama Credi E Vai)"	Italian and English	Andrea Bocelli	Andrea Bocelli, David Foster, Amy Foster		Closing Ceremony
2010	Vancouver	"I Believe": English Version	English	Nikki Yanofsky	Stephan Moccio; Alan Frew; Phil Ramone; Jesse Harris	Official Music Video	
2010	Vancouver	"J'imagine": French Version	French	Annie Villeneuve	Stephan Moccio; Alan Frew; Phil Ramone; Jesse Harris		
2014	Sochi	N/A					
2018	Pyeongchang	N/A					
2022	Beijing	N/A					
2026	Milan-Cortina d'Ampezzo	"Fantasia Italiana"	Instrumental	Dario Faini	Dario Faini	Behind the Scenes	

=== Medal ceremony theme songs ===
Games	Host City	Title	Peformers	Writer(s) and producer(s)
1998	Nagano			
2002	Salt Lake City	"Call of the Champions"	Utah Symphony, Tabernacle Choir	John Williams
2006	Turin			Henoel Grech
2010	Vancouver	"Medals"	The 2010 Vancouver Olympic Orchestra	Dave Pierce
2014	Sochi	"VICTORY!"	Petr Andreev, Nikolay Skvortsov, Dmitry Petrov,Margorita Mirmova, Il'ya Yudin	Maxim Bobkov
2018	Pyeongchang	"티어스 오브 글로리 (Tears of Glory)"		Cho Young-soo
2022	Beijing			
2026	Milan-Cortina d'Ampezzo	"Fantasia Italiana - Gran Finale"		Dardust (Dario Faini)

=== Other notable songs and anthems ===
Games	Host City	Title	Language(s)	Performer(s)	Writer(s) and producer(s)	Audio and videos	Live Performance
1984	Sarajevo	"The Gold and Beyond": ABC broadcast Theme song	English	John Denver	John Denver, Lee Holdridge		
1998	Nagano	"Big in Japan": NOS broadcast Theme song	English	Alphaville	Marian Gold, Bernhard Lloyd, Frank Mertens		
2006	Turin	"Live Olympic"	English	Verena Pötzl	Atanas Kovatchev Nasco		
2006	Turin	"Someday": NBC Sports Broadcast Theme Song	English	Flipsyde	Michael Urbano, Jinho "Piper" Ferreira, Steve Knight, Dave Lopez		
2010	Vancouver	"One World, One Flame": ARD broadcast Theme song	English	Bryan Adams	Bryan Adams, Jim Vallance and Gretchen Peters		
2010	Vancouver	"100%": Official Team USA Theme song	English	Mariah Carey	Mariah Carey, Crystal Johnson, Jermaine Dupri, Bryan-Michael Cox		
2014	Sochi	"Promises of No Man's Land": NOS broadcast Theme song	English	Blaudzun	Blaudzun		
2014	Sochi	"Legendary Lane": Holland Heineken House Theme song	English	Dinand Woesthoff	Dinand Woesthoff, Peter Kriek		
2018	Pyeongchang	"Let Everyone Shine": Torch Relay Promotional Song	Korean	Insooni		Official Music Video	
2018	Pyeongchang	"Whatever it Takes": NOS broadcast Theme song	English	Imagine Dragons	Dan Reynolds, Wayne Sermon, Ben McKee, Daniel Platzman, Joel Little		
2022	Beijing	"Skate": NOS broadcast Theme song	English	Silk Sonic	Bruno Mars, Brandon Anderson, Dernst Emile II, James Fauntleroy, Domitille Degalle, JD Beck		
2022	Beijing	"A Fire": NOS Speed skating broadcast Theme song	English	Orange Skyline	Simon Christiaanse, Mart Atema, Stefan van der Wielen, Niels van der Wielen		
2026	Milan-Cortina d'Ampezzo	"Fino all'alba"	Italian	Arisa	Giulio Gianni, Francesco Marrone	Official Audio	
2026	Milan-Cortina d'Ampezzo	" Bellissima": NOS broadcast Theme song	Italian	Annalisa	Davide Simonetta, Annalisa Scarrone, Paolo Antonacci		

== Albums ==
Summer Olympics

Games	Host City	Official	Others
1960	Rome		Olympia in Rome
1976	Montréal	Games of The XXI Olympiad, Montréal 1976 - Original Soundtrack	
1980	Moscow	Олимпийский Сувенир (Olympic Souvenir)	
1984	Los Angeles	The Official Music Of The XXIIIrd Olympiad Los Angeles 1984	
1988	Seoul		1988 Summer Olympics Album: One Moment in Time
1992	Barcelona	Barcelona Gold	
1996	Atlanta	Rhythm of the Games: 1996 Olympic Games Album	
2000	Sydney	The Games Of The XXVII Olympiad 2000: Music from the Opening Ceremony	
2000	Sydney	Syd, Millie and Olly Sing Their Favourite Olympic Songs	
2004	Athens	Unity: Official Athens 2004 Olympic Games	
2004	Athens	Harmony: The Official Athens 2004 Olympic Games Classical Album	
2008	Beijing	The Official Album for Beijing 2008 Olympic Games	AT&T Team USA Soundtrack
2012	London	Isles of Wonder	
2012	London	A Symphony of British Music	
2012	London	Mike Oldfield - Music For The Opening Ceremony Of The London 2012 Olympic Games	
2016	Rio de Janeiro		Rio 2016 (Olympic Themes & Anthems)
2020	Tokyo		Olympic Games Tokyo 2020: "Hoop" Lights Our Way
2024	Paris	Music from The Opening Ceremony of The Olympic Games Paris 2024	

Winter Olympics

Games	Host City	Official	Others
1960	Squaw Valley		The Ralph Sutton Quartet - Jazz At The Olympics
1992	Albertville	Cérémonies d'Ouverture et de Clôture des XVIe Jeux Olympiques d'Hiver d'Albertville 1992	
2002	Salt Lake City	Salt Lake 2002 Official Music Of The Games	
2010	Vancouver	Sounds of Vancouver 2010: Opening Ceremony Commemorative Album	
2014	Sochi	Хиты Олимпийских Зимних Игр В Сочи II (Hits Of The Sochi 2014 Olympic Winter Games II)	

== See also ==
- Olympic Hymn
- Art competitions at the Summer Olympics
- List of FIFA World Cup songs and anthems
- “Bugler’s Dream” (Leo Arnaud), used as theme music for Olympics broadcasts in the US
