= Party All Night =

Party All Night may refer to:

- "Party All Night (Sleep All Day)", a 2010 song by Sean Kingston
- "Party All Night", a song by Jeff Foxworthy with Little Texas from Games Rednecks Play
- "Party All Night", a song by Mytown from Mytown
- "Party All Night", a song by Quiet Riot from Condition Critical
- "Party All Night", a song from the soundtrack of the 2011 film A Cinderella Story: Once Upon a Song
- "No Matta What (Party All Night)", a song by Toya from Toya
- "Party All Night", a song by Yo Yo Honey Singh from the film Boss
- "Party All Night", a song by FEMM from Femm-Isation
