= Soon (album) =

Studio album by Tanya Tucker
- Released: October 11, 1993
- Genre: Country
- Length: 35:20
- Label: Liberty
- Producer: Jerry Crutchfield

Tanya Tucker chronology
| Greatest Hits 1990–1992 (1993) | Soon (1993) | Fire to Fire (1995) |

Singles from Soon
- 1. "Soon" Released: September 28, 1993; 2. "We Don't Have to Do This" Released: January 25, 1994; 3. "Hangin' In" Released: May 17, 1994; 4. "You Just Watch Me" Released: September 6, 1994

Professional ratings
Review scores
| Source | Rating |
|---|---|
| Allmusic | link |
| Chicago Tribune | link |
| Entertainment Weekly | A link |
| Los Angeles Times | link |

Soon is the 21st studio album by American country music artist Tanya Tucker. It was released on October 11, 1993, via Liberty Records. The top hits from Soon were the title song, "Soon" at #2, "Hangin' In" at #4. and "We Don't Have to Do This" at #11 on the Billboard Top Country Singles charts. "You Just Watch Me" rose to #20. The album rose to #18 on the Country Albums chart.

== Track listing ==
| No. | Title | Writer(s) | Length |
|---|---|---|---|
| 1. | "You Just Watch Me" | Rick Giles; Bob Regan | 4:31 |
| 2. | "Come on Honey" | Paul Davis | 3:30 |
| 3. | "Soon" | Casey Kelly; Regan | 3:28 |
| 4. | "I Love You Anyway" | Pat Terry | 2:45 |
| 5. | "Let the Good Times Roll" | Tony Martin; Reese Wilson | 3:35 |
| 6. | "We Don't Have to Do This" | Gary Burr, Victoria Shaw | 3:47 |
| 7. | "Hangin' In" | Steve Bogard, Giles | 3:24 |
| 8. | "Sneaky Moon" | Bill LaBounty | 3:17 |
| 9. | "Silence Is King" | Burr, Jim Photoglo | 4:09 |
| 10. | "A Blue Guitar" | Dennis Linde | 2:54 |

Netherlands edition
| No. | Title | Writer(s) | Length |
|---|---|---|---|
| 1. | "You Just Watch Me" | Rick Giles; Bob Regan | 4:31 |
| 2. | "I Love You Anyway" | Pat Terry | 2:45 |
| 3. | "Soon" | Casey Kelly; Bob Regan | 3:28 |
| 4. | "Black Water Bayou" | Matraca Berg; Ronnie Samoset | 3:30 |
| 5. | "Let the Good Times Roll" | Tony Martin; Reese Wilson | 3:35 |
| 6. | "Strong Enough to Bend" (Previously released) | Beth Nielsen Chapman; Don Schlitz | 2:42 |
| 7. | "Hangin' In" | Steve Bogard, Rick Giles | 3:24 |
| 8. | "As Long as There's a Heartbeat" (Previously released) | David Powelson | 3:10 |
| 9. | "Oh What It Did to Me" (Previously released) | Jerry Crutchfield | 3:26 |
| 10. | "Sneaky Moon" | Bill LaBounty | 3:17 |
| 11. | "Come on Honey" | Paul Davis | 3:30 |
| 12. | "We Don't Have to Do This" | Gary Burr, Victoria Shaw | 3:47 |
| 13. | "Silence Is King" | Gary Burr, Jim Photoglo | 4:09 |
| 14. | "A Blue Guitar" | Dennis Linde | 2:54 |

- Note: The liner notes of the Netherlands edition incorrectly state that track 4, "Black Water Bayou", had been previously released. It would later be included on the compilation album 20 Greatest Hits (2000), which would incorrectly label the track as "previously unreleased," even though it had been issued on this album seven years earlier.

== Production ==
- Produced by Jerry Crutchfield
- Engineers: Joe Bogan, Warren Peterson, Ron Reynolds

== Personnel ==
- Tanya Tucker - vocals
- Eddie Bayers, Paul Leim - drums
- David Hungate, Michael Rhodes - bass guitar
- Mike Lawler - synthesizer, keyboards
- Matt Rollings - piano
- Paul Davis - organ, backing vocals
- Steve Gibson, Brent Mason, Brent Rowan, Billy Joe Walker Jr. - guitar
- Rob Hajacos - fiddle
- Jerry Douglas, Brent Rowan - dobro
- Jim Horn, Harvey Thompson - saxophone
- Charles Rose - trombone
- George Tidwell - trumpet
- Bruce Watkins - banjo
- Gary Burr, Dale Daniel, Jonell Mosser, Curtis Young - backing vocals

== Charts ==
=== Weekly charts ===
| Chart (1993) | Peak position |
|---|---|
| Canadian Country Albums (RPM) | 11 |
| US Billboard 200 | 87 |
| US Top Country Albums (Billboard) | 18 |

=== Year-end charts ===
| Chart (1994) | Position |
|---|---|
| US Top Country Albums (Billboard) | 43 |
