= Between the Two of Them =

1992 song by Alabama

Song by Alabama

from the album American Pride
- Released: August 11, 1992
- Genre: Country
- Length: 3:58
- Label: RCA Nashville
- Songwriter(s): Mickey Cates

"Between the Two of Them"

Single by Tanya Tucker

from the album Fire to Fire
- B-side: "Love Will"
- Released: February 11, 1995
- Genre: Country
- Length: 3:12
- Label: Liberty
- Songwriter(s): Mickey Cates
- Producer(s): Jerry Crutchfield

Tanya Tucker singles chronology
"You Just Watch Me" (1994)	"Between the Two of Them" (1995)	"Find Out What's Happenin'" (1995)

"Between the Two of Them" is a song originally recorded by Alabama on their 1992 album American Pride and later recorded by American country music artist Tanya Tucker. It was released in February 1995 as the first single from Tucker's album Fire to Fire. The song reached #27 on the Billboard Hot Country Singles & Tracks chart. The song was written by Mickey Cates.

== Chart performance ==
Chart (1995)	Peak position
US Hot Country Songs (Billboard)	27
Canadian RPM Country Tracks	26
