= Vanessa Corish =

Australian singer-songwriter

- Born: Sydney, Australia
- Genres: Pop; Country; Folk; Rock
- Occupations: Singer; Songwriter; Record Producer
- Years active: 1998–present
- Labels: SONY; EMI; Universal

Vanessa Corish is an Australian-born singer-songwriter and record producer. She has written songs for artists including Olivia Newton-John, Tina Arena, Wynonna Judd, Human Nature, Donny Osmond and Troy Cassar-Daley. Some of Corish’s most notable works include the US Country #1 "Now That I Found You", recorded by Terri Clark,. and "Dare to Dream", performed by Olivia Newton-John and John Farnham at the opening ceremony of the Sydney 2000 Olympic Games, broadcast to an estimated global audience of 4.5 billion viewers.

== Career ==
Corish co-wrote the US #1 Country song "Now That I Found You" with Paul Begaud and J.D. Martin. The song appears on Clark’s album How I Feel, which was certified Platinum by the RIAA. The song was also included on Clark’s Greatest Hits 1994–2004, which is certified Gold by the RIAA.

In 2022, Country Universe featured "Now That I Found You" in its retrospective series on every No. 1 country single of the 1990s, crediting Corish alongside Paul Begaud and J.D. Martin as co-writers.

In a 2020 interview with ABC Radio, Corish reflected on writing "Dare to Dream" for the opening ceremony of the Sydney 2000 Olympic Games calling it “one of the greatest joys of my life,” and discussed the experience of hearing Olivia Newton-John and John Farnham perform the song at the Opening Ceremony.

Corish co-wrote and co-produced the song "Reach Out" with Paul Begaud for the 2006 Asian Games in Doha, Qatar. It was performed at the opening ceremony by Bollywood playback singer Sunidhi Chauhan. The event was broadcast to an estimated global television audience of 3 billion people

== Awards and nominations ==
- ASCAP Country Music Award – for "Now That I Found You"
- RIAA Platinum Album Award – How I Feel (Terri Clark)
- RIAA Gold Album Award – Greatest Hits 1994–2004 (Terri Clark)
- Australian Country Music People's Choice Award – Best Song ("Story of My Life", 2003)
