= Some Kind of Trouble (song) =

Single by Tanya Tucker

from the album What Do I Do with Me
- B-side: "Oh What It Did to Me"
- Released: February 15, 1992
- Recorded: 1991
- Genre: Country
- Length: 3:51
- Label: Liberty
- Songwriters: Mike Reid, Brent Maher, Don Potter
- Producer: Jerry Crutchfield

Tanya Tucker singles chronology
"(Without You) What Do I Do with Me" (1991)	"Some Kind of Trouble" (1992)	"If Your Heart Ain't Busy Tonight" (1992)

"Some Kind of Trouble" is a song written by Mike Reid, Brent Maher and Don Potter, and recorded by American country music artist Tanya Tucker. It was released in February 1992 as the third single from the album What Do I Do with Me. The song reached #3 on the Billboard Hot Country Singles & Tracks chart.

== Charts ==
=== Weekly charts ===
Chart (1992)	Peak position
Canada Country Singles (RPM)	15
US Hot Country Songs (Billboard)	3

=== Year-end charts ===
Chart (1992)	Position
US Country Songs (Billboard)	41
