= You Just Watch Me =

Single by Tanya Tucker

from the album Soon
- B-side: "I Love You Anyway"
- Released: September 17, 1994
- Genre: Country
- Length: 4:31
- Label: Liberty
- Songwriters: Bob Regan, Rick Giles
- Producer: Jerry Crutchfield

Tanya Tucker singles chronology
"Hangin' In" (1994)	"You Just Watch Me" (1994)	"Between the Two of Them" (1995)

"You Just Watch Me" is a song written by Bob Regan and Rick Giles. It was originally recorded by Libby Hurley for Epic Records in 1987. Her version went to number 43 on Hot Country Songs.

The song was later recorded by American country music artist Tanya Tucker. It was released in September 1994 as the fourth single from the album Soon. The song reached number 20 on the same chart.

== Chart performance ==
Chart (1994)	Peak position
Canada Country Singles (RPM)	14
US Hot Country Songs (Billboard)	20
