= Everytime I Cry =

Single by Terri Clark

from the album How I Feel
- B-side: "Till I Get There"
- Released: January 25, 1999
- Genre: Country
- Length: 3:47
- Label: Mercury
- Songwriters: Bob Regan; Karen Staley
- Producer: Keith Stegall

Terri Clark singles chronology
"You're Easy on the Eyes" (1998)	"Everytime I Cry" (1999)	"Unsung Hero" (1999)

Music video
- "Everytime I Cry" on YouTube

"Everytime I Cry" is a song written by Bob Regan and Karen Staley, and recorded by Canadian country music artist Terri Clark. It was released in January 1999 as the third single from her album How I Feel. The song reached number 2 on the RPM Country Tracks chart in May 1999 and number 12 on the Billboard Hot Country Singles & Tracks chart.

== Content ==
The song chronicles a woman's continuing disappointment in her ex-lover who keeps putting her heart into misery over and over again.

== Critical reception ==
Deborah Evans Price, of Billboard magazine reviewed the song favorably, saying that Clark gives a strong performance. She calls Stegall's production "always right on the mark."

== Music video ==
The music video was directed by Morgan Lawley and premiered in early 1999. The video shows Clark on an escalator and in a room with the walls around her moving closer, while the video storyline interprets various forms of domestic abuse.

A young boy is shown with a hamster in a cage, at the same time a man calls the house while the mother lets the phone ring. The boy attempts to answer the phone, but is advised not to. The mother, meanwhile is putting on makeup to cover bruises on her face.

The young boy goes over to a young girl's house with the hamster in the shoebox. As she attempts to leave, he witnesses the girl getting verbally and physically abused by her father, while a vicious dog is seen chained up in the yard. The boy runs home and calls 911 to report the abuse. After the call is made, the father is confronted by the authorities as the girl is apprehended by Child Protective Services. The young boy gives the girl the hamster he intended to give her earlier as she is in the police car.

Another girl is stealing money from her mother's purse and is kicked out of the family home after being confronted by her mother. She gets in the van with her boyfriend. When she attempts to return home later, the locks on the doors are changed. She attempts to break down the door to no avail, while her parents are in fear of their daughter, who then returns to her boyfriend.

The video sees both families meeting in a support group for abuse victims and concludes with the number for the National Domestic Violence Hotline showing on the screen.

== Chart performance ==
"Everytime I Cry" debuted at number 58 on the U.S. Billboard Hot Country Singles & Tracks for the week of February 6, 1999.

Chart (1999)	Peak position
Canada Country Singles (RPM)	2
US Billboard Hot 100	69
US Hot Country Songs (Billboard)	12

=== Year-end charts ===
Chart (1999)	Position
Canada Country Tracks (RPM)	36
US Country Songs (Billboard)	60
