= Greatest Hits Encore =

Studio album by Tanya Tucker
- Released: August 7, 1990
- Recorded: June 1990
- Studio: Music Mill Studio (Nashville)
- Genre: Country
- Length: 31:12
- Label: Capitol
- Producer: Jerry Crutchfield

Tanya Tucker chronology
Tennessee Woman (1990)	Greatest Hits Encore (1990)	What Do I Do with Me (1991)

Professional ratings
Review scores
Source	Rating
Allmusic	link
The Rolling Stone Album Guide	1992

Greatest Hits Encore is a 1990 studio album by American country music singer Tanya Tucker. Capitol Records' newly re-recorded versions of Tucker's hits for her former Columbia and MCA labels, which still owned the original versions.

During this time, Capitol had also signed other artists that had recorded for other labels in the past (including Ronnie Milsap and Eddie Rabbitt), and they also produced albums of re-recorded material for the label.

== Track listing ==
1. "San Antonio Stroll" (Peter Noah) – 2:55
2. "Delta Dawn" (Alex Harvey, Larry Collins) – 3:23
3. "Don't Believe My Heart Can Stand Another You" (Billy Ray Reynolds) – 3:04
4. "The Jamestown Ferry" (Bobby Borchers, Mack Vickery) – 3:03
5. "Here's Some Love" (Richard Mainegra, Jack Roberts) – 2:53
6. "Would You Lay with Me (In a Field of Stone)" (David Allan Coe) – 2:49
7. "Blood Red and Goin' Down" (Curly Putman) – 3:13
8. "Pecos Promenade" (Larry Collins, Sandy Pinkard, Snuff Garrett) – 2:53
9. "What's Your Mama's Name" (Earl Montgomery, Dallas Frazier) – 3:13
10. "Texas (When I Die)" (Ed Bruce, Bobby Borchers, Patsy Bruce) – 4:01

== Personnel ==
- Tanya Tucker - lead vocals, backing vocals
- Eddie Bayers - drums, backing vocals
- Jessica Boucher - backing vocals
- Carol Chase - backing vocals
- Steve Gibson - acoustic guitar, electric guitar, hi-string guitar, mandolin, backing vocals
- Greg Gordon - backing vocals
- Rob Hajacos - fiddle
- Byron House - Fairlight
- Mitch Humphries - piano, synthesizer, backing vocals
- Mike Lawler - synthesizer
- Charlie McCoy - harmonica
- Weldon Myrick - Dobro, steel guitar, backing vocals
- Michael Rhodes - bass guitar, backing vocals
- Billy Sanford - acoustic guitar, electric guitar, backing vocals
- Lisa Silver - backing vocals
