= You're Easy on the Eyes =

Single by Terri Clark

from the album How I Feel
- B-side: "That's Me Not Loving You"
- Released: August 17, 1998
- Genre: Country
- Length: 3:33
- Label: Mercury
- Songwriters: Terri Clark; Tom Shapiro; Chris Waters
- Producer: Keith Stegall

Terri Clark singles chronology
"Now That I Found You" (1998)	"You're Easy on the Eyes" (1998)	"Everytime I Cry" (1999)

"You're Easy on the Eyes" is a song co-written and recorded by Canadian country music artist Terri Clark. It was released in August 1998 as the second single from her CD, How I Feel, it spent three weeks at the top of the Billboard Hot Country Singles & Tracks (now Hot Country Songs) chart, giving Clark her first Number One single in the United States. It was written by Clark, Tom Shapiro and Chris Waters.

== Music video ==
The music video was directed by Steven Goldmann.

== Chart performance ==
"You're Easy on the Eyes" debuted at number 55 on the U.S. Billboard Hot Country Singles & Tracks for the week of August 29, 1998.

Chart (1998)	Peak position
Canada Country Singles (RPM)	1
US Billboard Hot 100	40
US Hot Country Songs (Billboard)	1

=== Year-end charts ===
Chart (1998)	Position
Canada Country Tracks (RPM)	61

Chart (1999)	Position
US Country Songs (Billboard)	54
