= We Don't Have to Do This =

"We Don’t Have to Do This"

Single by Tanya Tucker

from the album Soon
- B-side: "Silence Is King"
- Released: January 1994
- Genre: Country
- Length: 3:47
- Label: Liberty
- Songwriters: Gary Burr; Victoria Shaw
- Producer: Jerry Crutchfield

Tanya Tucker singles chronology
"Soon" (1993)	"We Don’t Have to Do This" (1994)	"Hangin' In" (1994)

"We Don't Have to Do This" is a song written by Gary Burr and Victoria Shaw, and recorded by American country music artist Tanya Tucker. It was released in January 1994 as the second single from her album Soon. The song reached number 11 on the Billboard Hot Country Singles & Tracks chart in April 1994.

== Chart performance ==
Chart (1994)	Peak position
Canada Country Singles (RPM)	16
US Hot Country Songs (Billboard)	11
