= (Without You) What Do I Do with Me =

Single by Tanya Tucker

from the album What Do I Do with Me
- B-side: "Oh What It Did to Me"
- Released: October 12, 1991
- Genre: Country
- Length: 2:55
- Label: Capitol Nashville
- Songwriters: L. David Lewis, David Chamberlain, Royce Porter
- Producer: Jerry Crutchfield

Tanya Tucker singles chronology
"Down to My Last Teardrop" (1991)	"(Without You) What Do I Do with Me" (1991)	"Some Kind of Trouble" (1992)

"(Without You) What Do I Do with Me" is a song written by L. David Lewis, David Chamberlain and Royce Porter, and recorded by American country music artist Tanya Tucker. It was released in October 1991 as the second single and title track from the album What Do I Do with Me. The song reached #2 on the Billboard Hot Country Singles & Tracks chart, behind Collin Raye's "Love, Me".

== Chart performance ==
Chart (1991–1992)	Peak position
Canada Country Singles (RPM)	2
US Hot Country Songs (Billboard)	2

=== Year-end charts ===
Chart (1992)	Position
Canada Country Tracks (RPM)	69
