= Soon (Tanya Tucker song) =

Single by Tanya Tucker

from the album Soon
- B-side: "Sneaky Moon"
- Released: October 9, 1993
- Genre: Country
- Length: 3:28
- Label: Liberty
- Songwriters: Bob Regan, Casey Kelly
- Producer: Jerry Crutchfield

Tanya Tucker singles chronology
"Tell Me About It" (1993)	"Soon" (1993)	"We Don't Have to Do This" (1994)

"Soon" is a song written by Bob Regan and Casey Kelly, and recorded by American country music artist Tanya Tucker. It was released in October 1993 as the first single and title track from the album Soon. The song reached #2 on the Billboard Hot Country Singles & Tracks chart, behind Doug Supernaw's "I Don't Call Him Daddy".

== Content ==
"Soon" is composed in the key of A major. Its verses follow the chord pattern F♯m-Fdim-A/E-D-G9-F♯-B-Bm7-Esus4-E, while the chorus follows the pattern A-D-A-E/G♯-F♯m-B7sus4-B-Bm7-E-A and the bridge is C♯m-D-A-Bm twice. The song follows a woman who has an affair with a married man, who tells her that he will "soon" be available for her; at the end, the woman realizes that the man has not ended his existing relationship. During a songwriting session, Bob Regan met Casey Kelly for the first time when Kelly presented a lyric that he had first written in the 1980s: "Christmas finds her all alone with no cause to rejoice / So she calls his Code-a-Phone just to hear his voice", as well as the song's general concept and title. The two also decided on a "lyrically different chorus to go with each additional verse". After completing the song, they immediately decided to pitch it to Tanya Tucker, who they thought would "take a chance" on the song's unusual material.

== Chart performance ==
Chart (1993)	Peak position
Canada Country Singles (RPM)	15
US Hot Country Songs (Billboard)	2
