= Find Out What's Happenin' =

Song by Jerry Crutchfield

- German release picture sleeve

Single by Bobby Bare

from the album The English Country Side
- B-side: "When Am I Ever Gonna Settle Down"
- Released: 1968
- Genre: Country
- Length: 2:10
- Label: RCA Victor
- Songwriter: Jerry Crutchfield
- Producer: Chet Atkins

Bobby Bare singles chronology
"The Piney Wood Hills" (1967)	"Find Out What's Happenin'" (1968)	"Little Bit Later on Down the Line" (1968)

"Find Out What's Happenin'"

Single by Barbara Fairchild

from the album Someone Special
- B-side: "(When You Close Your Eyes) I'll Make You See"
- Released: 1970
- Genre: Country
- Length: 2:52
- Label: Columbia
- Songwriter: Jerry Crutchfield
- Producer: Billy Sherrill

Barbara Fairchild singles chronology
"A Girl Who'll Satisfy Her Man" (1970)	"Find Out What's Happenin'" (1970)	"(Loving You Is) Sunshine" (1971)

"Find Out What's Happenin'"

Single by Tanya Tucker

from the album Fire to Fire
- Released: May 27, 1995
- Genre: Country
- Length: 3:11
- Label: Liberty
- Songwriter: Jerry Crutchfield
- Producer: Jerry Crutchfield

Tanya Tucker singles chronology
"Between the Two of Them" (1995)	"Find Out What's Happenin'" (1995)	"Little Things" (1997)

"Find Out What's Happenin'" is a song written by Jerry Crutchfield and recorded by Bobby Bare for his 1968 album The English Country Side, which he recorded with a group from England called The Hillsiders. The song peaked at number 15 on the Billboard Hot Country Singles chart.

In 1970, a cover version by Barbara Fairchild, recorded for her album Someone Special, reached number 52 on the Billboard Hot Country Singles chart that year. The song was also done as a cover by Elvis Presley on his 1973 album, Raised on Rock. In 1993, the song was recorded as the title track to Pearl River's debut album. In 1995, Tanya Tucker covered the song and released it the second single from her album Fire to Fire. It reached number 40 on the Billboard Hot Country Singles & Tracks chart that year.

== Chart performance ==
=== Bobby Bare ===
Chart (1968)	Peak position
US Hot Country Songs (Billboard)	15
Canadian RPM Country Tracks	5

=== Barbara Fairchild ===
Chart (1970)	Peak position
US Hot Country Songs (Billboard)	52

=== Tanya Tucker ===
Chart (1995)	Peak position
US Hot Country Songs (Billboard)	40
Canadian RPM Country Tracks	45
