= Hangin' In (song) =

Single by Tanya Tucker

from the album Soon
- B-side: "Let the Good Times Roll"
- Released: May 28, 1994
- Genre: Country
- Length: 3:24
- Label: Liberty
- Songwriters: Steve Bogard, Rick Giles
- Producer: Jerry Crutchfield

Tanya Tucker singles chronology
"We Don't Have to Do This" (1994)	"Hangin' In" (1994)	"You Just Watch Me" (1994)

"Hangin' In" is a song written by Steve Bogard and Rick Giles, and recorded by American country music artist Tanya Tucker. It was released in May 1994 as the third single from the album Soon. The song reached #4 on the Billboard Hot Country Singles & Tracks chart.

== Chart performance ==
Chart (1994)	Peak position
Canada Country Singles (RPM)	17
US Hot Country Songs (Billboard)	4

=== Year-end charts ===
Chart (1994)	Position
US Country Songs (Billboard)	46
