= Can't Run from Yourself =

Studio album by Tanya Tucker
- Released: October 6, 1992
- Studio: Emerald Sound, Imagine Studio, Javelina Studios, Nightingale Recording Studio, Scruggs Sound Studio, Sound Stage Studio, and Studio 6, Nashville, TN
- Genre: Country
- Length: 35:26
- Label: Liberty
- Producer: Jerry Crutchfield

Tanya Tucker chronology
What Do I Do with Me (1991)	Can't Run from Yourself (1992)	Greatest Hits 1990–1992 (1993)

Singles from Can't Run from Yourself
- 1. "Two Sparrows in a Hurricane" Released: September 22, 1992; 2. "It's a Little Too Late" Released: January 19, 1993; 3. "Tell Me About It" Released: April 6, 1993

Professional ratings
Review scores
Source	Rating
AllMusic	3/5 stars
Chicago Tribune	3.5/4 stars
Entertainment Weekly	B

Can't Run from Yourself is the 20th studio album by American country music singer Tanya Tucker, it was released on October 6, 1992 as her first album for Liberty Records after Capitol Records dropped Tucker from the label in 1991. There were three Billboard Top Ten Country Singles from Can't Run from Yourself: "It's a Little Too Late" and "Two Sparrows in a Hurricane" both at #2, and "Tell Me About It," a duet with Delbert McClinton, at #4. The album peaked at #12 on the Country Albums chart. Tammy Wynette would later cover "What Do They Know" for her 1994 album Without Walls.

Brian Mansfield of Allmusic rated it three stars out of five, saying that it was more "consistent" than her previous album.

== Track listing ==
No.	Title	Writer(s)	Length
1.	"It's a Little Too Late"	Pat Terry, Roger Murrah	2:39
2.	"Can't Run from Yourself"	Marshall Chapman	4:13
3.	"Two Sparrows in a Hurricane"	Mark Alan Springer	4:08
4.	"Don't Let My Heart Be the Last to Know"	Dennis Morgan, Billy Burnette	4:17
5.	"Tell Me About It" (duet with Delbert McClinton)	Bill LaBounty, Pat McLaughlin	3:45
6.	"I've Learned to Live"	Dean Dillon, Frank Dycus	3:19
7.	"What Do They Know"	Richard Ross, Donny Kees	3:16
8.	"Rainbow Rider"	Bobby Fischer, Charlie Black, Austin Roberts	3:35
9.	"Half the Moon"	Hugh Prestwood	2:58
10.	"Danger Ahead"	Paul Kennerley	3:16

== Personnel ==
- Tanya Tucker – lead vocals
- Larry Byrom – acoustic guitar
- Beth Nielsen Chapman – backing vocals
- Carol Chase – backing vocals
- Dan Dugmore – steel guitar
- Sonny Garrish – steel guitar
- Greg Gordon – backing vocals
- Rob Hajacos – fiddle
- David Hungate – bass guitar
- John Barlow Jarvis – piano
- Craig Krampf – drums
- Mike Lawler – keyboards, synthesizer
- Paul Leim – drums
- Brent Mason – electric guitar
- Delbert McClinton – duet vocals on "Tell Me About It"
- Terry McMillan – harmonica
- Jonell Mosser – backing vocals
- Louis Dean Nunley – backing vocals
- Bobby Ogdin – piano, synthesizer
- Wayland Patton – backing vocals
- Cindy Richardson-Walker – backing vocals
- Tom Roady – percussion
- Matt Rollings – keyboards
- Brent Rowan – electric guitar, mandolin
- Billy Joe Walker Jr. – acoustic guitar
- Bob Wray – bass guitar
- Reggie Young – electric guitar

== Chart performance ==
Chart (1992)	Peak position
U.S. Billboard Top Country Albums	12
U.S. Billboard 200	51
Canadian RPM Country Albums	4
