= How I Feel (album) =

Studio album by Terri Clark
- Released: May 19, 1998
- Genre: Country
- Length: 46:27
- Label: Mercury Nashville
- Producer: Keith Stegall

Terri Clark chronology
Just the Same (1996)	How I Feel (1998)	Fearless (2000)

Singles from How I Feel
- 1. "Now That I Found You" Released: April 6, 1998; 2. "You're Easy on the Eyes" Released: August 17, 1998; 3. "Everytime I Cry" Released: January 25, 1999; 4. "Unsung Hero" Released: May 24, 1999

Professional ratings
Review scores
Source	Rating
Allmusic	4/5 stars

How I Feel is the third studio album by Canadian country music artist Terri Clark. Released in 1998 on Mercury Nashville, the album produced the singles "Now That I Found You", "You're Easy on the Eyes", "Everytime I Cry", and "Unsung Hero". In the U.S., these singles respectively reached #2, #1, #12, and #47 on the Billboard country charts, with "You're Easy on the Eyes" being her first #1 in that country. On the RPM country charts in Canada, they reached #2, #1, #2 and #15. The album was certified platinum in both countries. "I'm Alright" was previously recorded by Kim Richey on her 1997 album Bitter Sweet while "Unsung Hero" was previously recorded by Tina Arena on her second album In Deep released in 1997.

== Track listing ==
No.	Title	Writer(s)	Length
1.	"I'm Alright"	Angelo Petraglia, Larry Gottlieb, Kim Richey	4:00
2.	"Now That I Found You"	J. D. Martin, Paul Begaud, Vanessa Corish	3:37
3.	"Everytime I Cry"	Bob Regan, Karen Staley	3:48
4.	"That's How I Feel"	Sunny Russ, Terri Clark, Stephony Smith	4:01
5.	"You're Easy on the Eyes"	Clark, Tom Shapiro, Chris Waters	3:33
6.	"Getting Even with the Blues"	Clark, Shapiro, Waters	4:00
7.	"Till I Get There"	Clark, Shapiro, Waters	3:53
8.	"Not Getting Over You"	Clark	3:47
9.	"This Ole Heart"	David Lee, Tony Lane	4:00
10.	"Cure for the Common Heartache"	Leslie Satcher, Melba Montgomery, Larry Cordle	3:33
11.	"That's Me Not Loving You"	Bob DiPiero, Waters, Clark	3:15
12.	"Unsung Hero"	David Tyson, Tina Arena, Dean McTaggart	5:00

== Personnel ==
As listed in liner notes.

=== Musicians ===
- Terri Clark - lead vocals
- J. T. Corenflos - electric guitar
- Dan Dugmore - slide guitar, steel guitar
- Stuart Duncan - fiddle, mandolin
- Paul Franklin - steel guitar
- Sonny Garrish - steel guitar
- Owen Hale - drums, percussion
- John Barlow Jarvis - piano
- Brent Mason - electric guitar
- Gary Prim - keyboards
- John Willis - acoustic guitar
- Glenn Worf - bass guitar

=== Background vocalists ===
- Robert Bailey
- Terri Clark
- Vicki Hampton
- Alison Krauss (on "Cure for the Common Heartache")
- Sunny Russ
- John Wesley Ryles
- Stephony Smith

== Chart performance ==
=== Weekly charts ===
Chart (1998)	Peak position
Canadian Albums (RPM)	38
Canadian Country Albums (RPM)	4
US Billboard 200	70
US Top Country Albums (Billboard)	10

=== Year-end charts ===
Chart (1998)	Position
US Top Country Albums (Billboard)	40
Chart (1999)	Position
US Top Country Albums (Billboard)	58
