= Fire to Fire =

Studio album by Tanya Tucker
- Released: March 21, 1995
- Genre: Country
- Length: 34:49
- Label: Liberty
- Producer: Jerry Crutchfield

Tanya Tucker chronology
| Soon (1993) | Fire to Fire (1995) | Complicated (1997) |

Singles from Fire to Fire
- 1. "Between the Two of Them" Released: January 1995; 2. "Find Out What's Happenin'" Released: May 1995

Professional ratings
Review scores
| Source | Rating |
|---|---|
| AllMusic | 3/5 stars |
| Chicago Tribune | 2.5/4 stars |
| Entertainment Weekly | B |
| Orlando Sentinel | 2/5 stars |
| Q | 4/5 stars |

Fire to Fire is the 22nd studio album by American country music singer Tanya Tucker, released on March 21, 1995 as her last album for Liberty Records, after this album's release, Tanya Tucker left Liberty's roster and returned to Capitol Records. It produced the singles "Between the Two of Them" and "Find Out What's Happenin'", both of which charted on the Hot Country Songs charts, at #27 and #40 respectively. "I'll Take Today" was later recorded by Ty England on his 1996 album Two Ways to Fall, and in 1998 by Gary Allan on his album It Would Be You; Allan's rendition was released as a single in 1998. The song "Nobody Dies from a Broken Heart" was also covered by country singer Reba McEntire for her 2000 release, So Good Together. "Find Out What's Happenin'" was originally recorded by Bobby Bare in 1968, Barbara Fairchild in 1970, and Pearl River on their 1993 debut album of the same name. "I'll Take the Memories" was originally recorded by Lorrie Morgan on her 1989 album, Leave the Light On.

== Track listing ==
| No. | Title | Writer(s) | Length |
|---|---|---|---|
| 1. | "Come In Out of the World" | Don Schlitz, Billy Livsey | 3:24 |
| 2. | "I'll Take the Memories" | Charlie Craig, Keith Stegall | 3:49 |
| 3. | "I Bet She Knows" | Paul Thorn, Billy Maddox | 4:02 |
| 4. | "Find Out What's Happenin'" | Jerry Crutchfield | 3:11 |
| 5. | "Fire to Fire" (duet with Willie Nelson) | Sharon Vaughn, Bill Rice, Mike Lawler | 3:28 |
| 6. | "Between the Two of Them" | Mickey Cates | 3:12 |
| 7. | "Nobody Dies from a Broken Heart" | Randy Sharp, Sonny LeMaire | 3:57 |
| 8. | "I'll Take Today" | Kent Robbins, Will Robinson | 3:10 |
| 9. | "The Love You Gave to Me" | Gary Nicholson, Delbert McClinton | 3:40 |
| 10. | "Love Will" | Byron Hill, Cyril Rawson | 2:56 |

== Personnel ==
- Tanya Tucker - vocals
- Paul Leim - drums
- David Hungate, Michael Rhodes, Willie Weeks - bass guitar
- Mitch Humphries, John Barlow Jarvis, Steve Nathan, Matt Rollings - keyboards
- Mike Lawler - synthesizer
- Steve Gibson, Dann Huff, Chris Leuzinger, Brent Rowan, Billy Joe Walker Jr., Reggie Young - guitar
- Dan Dugmore, Paul Franklin, Sonny Garrish - steel guitar
- Rob Hajacos - fiddle
- Christy Cornelius, Gregory Gordon, Sharon Rice, Judy Rodman, Sunny Russ, Randy Sharp, Curtis Young - backing vocals
- Nashville String Machine - strings; led by Carl Gorodetzky
- Bergen White - string arrangements

== Production ==
- Produced By Jerry Crutchfield
- Engineers: Tim Kish, Warren Peterson, Marty Williams
- Assistant Engineers: Derek Bason (also mix assistant), Ricky Cobble, Grant Greene, Joe Hayden, Mark Ralston, King Williams
- Mixing: John Guess
- Mastering: Glenn Meadows

== Chart performance ==
| Chart (1995) | Peak position |
|---|---|
| U.S. Billboard Top Country Albums | 28 |
| U.S. Billboard 200 | 169 |
