= Unsung Hero (Terri Clark song) =

Song by Tina Arena

from the album In Deep
- Genre: Pop; Pop rock
- Length: 4:37
- Label: Columbia
- Songwriters: Tina Arena; Dean McTaggart; David Tyson
- Producers: Mick Jones; David Tyson

"Unsung Hero" is a song written by Australian singer Tina Arena collaborating with Dean McTaggart, and David Tyson. It was originally recorded by Arena for her fourth studio album In Deep (1997), which was released on 18 August 1997 through Columbia Records. The song was produced by Mick Jones and David Tyson. It was not released as a single from the album.

The song was covered by Canadian country music artist Terri Clark for her third studio album How I Feel (1998).

== Terri Clark version ==
"Unsung Hero"

Single by Terri Clark

from the album How I Feel
- B-side: "Not Getting Over You"
- Released: 24 May 1999
- Recorded: 1997
- Studio: The Castle (Franklin, Tennessee)
- Genre: Country
- Length: 3:54
- Label: Mercury Nashville
- Songwriters: Tina Arena; Dean McTaggart; David Tyson
- Producer: Keith Stegall

Terri Clark singles chronology
"Everytime I Cry" (1999)	"Unsung Hero" (1999)	"A Little Gasoline" (2000)

Canadian country music artist Terri Clark recorded a cover of the song for her third studio album How I Feel (1998). Clark's version was produced by Keith Stegall. It was released on 24 May 1999, as the fourth and final single from the album.

Clark's version hit number 47 on the US Hot Country Songs chart and peaked at number 15 on the Canadian RPM Country Tracks.

=== Content ===
Clark said that producer Keith Stegall told her it was the most expensive vocals he had ever recorded. When recording the cover, Clark thought of her mother, saying "When my mom heard it, she started to cry. She is so close to me. I probably think of her more than anybody when I sing this song."

=== Critical reception ===
Billboard magazine gave the single a positive review by saying, "Clark once again turns in a solid performance, while producer Keith Stegall accomplishes exactly what we have come to expect from him. The lyric, in spirit of "Wind Beneath My Wings", pays homage to the strong silent type who has always stood by, allowing a partner to take the spotlight." They ended their review by saying "Clark's rendition will likely generate strong airplay, thanks to her current status at country radio."

=== Commercial performance ===
"Unsung Hero" debuted on the US Billboard Hot Country Songs chart the week of 29 May 1999, at number 60. In its fifth week, the song reached its peak of number 47. It stayed 10 weeks on the chart.

The song debuted at number 82 on the Canadian RPM Country Tracks chart the week of 14 June 1999. In its seventh week, it reached its peak position of number 15 on 26 July 1999. It spent 17 weeks on the chart.

=== Track listing ===
7-inch single
No.	Title	Writer(s)	Length
1.	"Unsung Hero"	Tina Arena; David Tyson; Dean McTaggart	3:54
2.	"Not Getting Over You"	Terri Clark	3:48

=== Charts ===
Chart (1999)	Peak position
Canada Country Singles (RPM)	15
US Hot Country Songs (Billboard)	47

=== Release history ===
Release dates and format(s) for "Unsung Hero"
Region	Date	Format(s)	Label(s)	Ref.
United States	24 May 1999	Country radio	Mercury Nashville	
