= Now That I Found You (Terri Clark song) =

Single by Terri Clark

from the album How I Feel
- B-side: "Getting Even with the Blues"
- Released: April 6, 1998
- Genre: Country
- Length: 3:37
- Label: Mercury
- Songwriters: J. D. Martin; Paul Begaud; Vanessa Corish
- Producer: Keith Stegall

Terri Clark singles chronology
"Something in the Water" (1997)	"Now That I Found You" (1998)	"You're Easy on the Eyes" (1998)

"Now That I Found You" is a song written by Paul Begaud, Vanessa Corish and J.D. Martin, and recorded by Canadian country music artist Terri Clark. It was released in April 1998 as the first single from her album How I Feel. On July 17, 1998, the song reached number 1 on the US Radio & Records chart, number 2 on the Canadian RPM Country Tracks chart in July 1998 and number 2 on the US Billboard Hot Country Singles & Tracks chart.

== Awards ==
The song was awarded both Broadcast Music, Inc. and ASCAP performance awards. BMI also awarded their songwriters the BMI Millionairs award for receiving one million spins.

== Cover versions ==
The song was covered by Australian vocal group Human Nature on their 1999 album Counting Down and by Irish pop group Mytown on their 2000 self-titled album.

== Critical reception ==
Deborah Evans Price, of Billboard magazine reviewed the song favorably, calling it "a pretty ballad that features a lovely romantic lyric and a sing-along chorus." She goes on to say that Clark "temporairly abandons the female honky-tonk stance to deliver a silky, warm vocal performance on this gentle track."

== Music video ==
The music video was directed by Steven Goldmann and premiered in April 1998.

== Chart performance ==
"Now That I Found You" debuted at number 74 on the U.S. Billboard Hot Country Singles & Tracks for the week of April 4, 1998. The song also reached #1 on the Radio & Records Country Chart and reached #2 on the US Hot Country Songs chart in July, 1998.

Chart (1998)	Peak position
Canada Country Singles (RPM)	2
US Billboard Hot 100	72
US Hot Country Songs (Billboard)	2

=== Year-end charts ===
Chart (1998)	Position
Canada Country Tracks (RPM)	2
US Country Songs (Billboard)	15
