= Mytown (album) =

Studio album by Mytown
- Released: Late 1999 (United States); 23 May 2000 (Canada and Australia)
- Recorded: 1997–1999
- Genre: Pop
- Length: 45:51
- Label: Universal
- Producer: Teddy Riley, Rick Nowels, Billy Steinberg, Mark Sheehan, Andy Whitmore

Singles from Mytown
- 1. "Do It Like This" Released: 18 March 1997; 2. "Party All Night" Released: February 1999; 3. "Body Bumpin'" Released: 5 October 1999; 4. "Now That I Found You" Released: 7 March 2000

Mytown is the only studio album released by Irish boy band Mytown. The debut album was the only album released by the band before their break-up in 2001, with two of its members (Danny O'Donoghue and Mark Sheehan) later going on to form the alternative rock band The Script. Four singles were released from the album: "Do It Like This", which was only released in Ireland, "Body Bumpin'", which was only released in the United States, a cover of Terri Clark's 1998 country music hit "Now That I Found You", which was only released in the United States and Australia, and "Party All Night". Only the latter of these reached the UK Singles Chart, peaking at No.22. Although the album was planned for release internationally, both the British and Irish releases never saw the light of day; and the album was only released in the United States, Canada and Australia. The album also includes a cover of Wham!'s 1984 hit "Everything She Wants".

== Track listing ==
No.	Title	Writer(s)	Producer(s)	Length
1.	"C'mon Everybody"	Danny O'Donoghue, Mark Sheehan, Terry Daly, Shawn Stockman	Stockman, Sheehan	2:47
2.	"Body Bumpin'"	O'Donoghue, Sheehan, Daly, James Knight, Johnny Singletary, Screwface, Teddy Riley	Riley, Sheehan	3:43
3.	"Lifetime Affair"	O'Donoghue, Sheehan, Daly, Wanya Morris, William Guice	Sheehan	4:36
4.	"Party All Night"	O'Donoghue, Sheehan, Daly	Sheehan/Jack Knight	3:31
5.	"Do It Like This"	O'Donoghue, Sheehan, Daly, Andy Whitmore	Whitmore, Sheehan	3:37
6.	"Now That I Found You"	JD Martin, Paul Begaud, Vanessa Corish	Simon Franglen, Tim Lauber	3:56
7.	"Time Will Tell"	O'Donoghue, Sheehan, Daly, Barry Grace	Sheehan	3:43
8.	"Love Sent Angel"	O'Donoghue, Sheehan, Daly, Narada Michael Walden, Rodney "Cortada" Alejandro	Sheehan	4:29
9.	"Girl in Tears"	O'Donoghue, Sheehan, Daly, Billy Steinberg, Rick Nowels	Steinberg, Nowels, Sheehan	4:27
10.	"I Like Your Style"	O'Donoghue, Sheehan, Daly, Andy Whitmore, Craig Matthais	Whitmore, Sheehan	4:44
11.	"Everything She Wants"	George Michael	Riley	4:11
12.	"This is The Time"	O'Donoghue, Sheehan, Daly	Sheehan	3:54
13.	"The Day"	O'Donoghue	O'Donoghue/Wanya Morris	4:50

== Singles ==
- "Do It Like This" (18 March 1997, Ireland)
1. "Do It Like This" – Radio Edit – 3:37
2. "Do It Like This" – Club Mix – 3:37
3. "Starting Out" – 4:11
- "Body Bumpin'" (5 October 1999, United States)
1. "Body Bumpin'" – 3:43
2. "Now That I Found You" – Album Snippet – 2:00
3. "Lifetime Affair" – Album Snippet – 2:00
4. "Like Your Style" – Album Snippet – 2:00
- "Now That I Found You" (7 March 2000)
1. "Now That I Found You" – 3:56
2. "Lifetime Affair" – Live Acoustic – 4:22
3. "Like Your Style" – Live Acoustic – 3:18
- "Party All Night" (re-release) (19 June 2000)

Cassette

1. "Party All Night" – Radio Remix – 3:35
2. "Party All Night" – Love To Infinity Radio Mix – 3:41

CD1

1. "Party All Night" – Radio Remix – 3:35
2. "Party All Night" – Love To Infinity Radio Mix – 3:41
3. "Party All Night" – Instant Flava Remix – 4:09
4. "Party All Night" – Video – 3:46

CD2

1. "Party All Night" – Radio Remix – 3:35
2. "Party All Night" – Love To Infinity Boogie Dawg Mix – 7:15
3. "Party All Night" – Love To Infinity Freaky Friday Mix – 6:50
