= Don't Go Out =

- Cassette single cover art

Single by Tanya Tucker with T. Graham Brown

from the album Tennessee Woman
- B-side: "Oh What it Did to Me"
- Released: June 23, 1990
- Genre: Country
- Length: 3:14
- Label: Capitol Nashville
- Songwriters: Radney Foster, Bill Lloyd
- Producer: Jerry Crutchfield

Tanya Tucker singles chronology
"Walking Shoes" (1990)	"Don't Go Out" (1990)	"It Won't Be Me" (1990)

T. Graham Brown singles chronology
"If You Could Only See Me Now" (1990)	"Don't Go Out" (1990)	"Moonshadow Road" (1990)

"Don't Go Out", also known as "Don't Go Out with Him", is a song written by Radney Foster and Bill Lloyd, and recorded by Foster & Lloyd on their 1987 self-titled debut album. In June 1990, a cover version, titled "Don't Go Out", recorded by American country artists Tanya Tucker and T. Graham Brown was released as the second single from Tucker's album Tennessee Woman. The song reached number 6 on the Billboard Hot Country Singles & Tracks chart.

== Content ==
The song is a duet in which the two singers, who have feelings for each other, attempt to discourage each other from becoming involved with their love triangle suitors by saying negative things about them.

== Chart performance ==
Chart (1990)	Peak position
Canada Country Singles (RPM)	11
US Hot Country Songs (Billboard)	6

=== Year-end charts ===
Chart (1990)	Position
US Country Songs (Billboard)	69
