= If Your Heart Ain't Busy Tonight =

Single by Tanya Tucker

from the album What Do I Do with Me
- B-side: "Down to My Last Teardrop"
- Released: May 30, 1992
- Genre: Country
- Length: 3:02
- Label: Liberty
- Songwriters: Tom Shapiro, Chris Waters
- Producer: Jerry Crutchfield

Tanya Tucker singles chronology
"Some Kind of Trouble" (1992)	"If Your Heart Ain't Busy Tonight" (1992)	"Two Sparrows in a Hurricane" (1992)

"If Your Heart Ain't Busy Tonight" is a song written by Tom Shapiro and Chris Waters, and recorded by American country music artist Tanya Tucker. It was released in May 1992 as the fourth single from the album What Do I Do with Me. The song reached #4 on the Billboard Hot Country Singles & Tracks chart.

== Chart performance ==
Chart (1992)	Peak position
Canada Country Singles (RPM)	5
US Hot Country Songs (Billboard)	4

=== Year-end charts ===
Chart (1992)	Position
Canada Country Tracks (RPM)	78
US Country Songs (Billboard)	42
