= Tennessee Woman =

Studio album by Tanya Tucker
- Released: April 17, 1990
- Recorded: 1989–1990
- Studio: Javalina Recording Studios, The Music Mill, Sound Stage Studios, and Stargem Recording Studios Nashville, TN
- Genre: Country
- Length: 31:26
- Label: Capitol
- Producer: Jerry Crutchfield

Tanya Tucker chronology
Greatest Hits (1989)	Tennessee Woman (1990)	Greatest Hits Encore (1990)

Singles from Tennessee Woman
- 1. "Walking Shoes" Released: March 6, 1990; 2. "Don't Go Out" Released: June 5, 1990; 3. "It Won't Be Me" Released: October 2, 1990; 4. "Oh What It Did to Me" Released: February 5, 1991

Professional ratings
Review scores
Source	Rating
AllMusic	3/5 stars
Orlando Sentinel	3/5 stars
The Rolling Stone Album Guide	2/5 stars

Tennessee Woman is the 18th studio album by American country music singer Tanya Tucker, released on April 17, 1990. Three singles from Tennessee Woman made the Billboard Top Ten Country singles charts: "Walking Shoes" at #3, and "It Won't Be Me" and the duet with T. Graham Brown, "Don't Go Out" both at #6. Rounding out the hits was the #12 "Oh What It Did to Me." The album charted in at #18 in the Country Albums category.

"Take Another Run" was later a single for co-writer Paul Overstreet from his album Love Is Strong.

== Track listing ==
Tennessee Woman track listing
No.	Title	Writer(s)	Length
1.	"Take Another Run"	Paul Overstreet, Don Schlitz	3:01
2.	"Shotgun"	Michael Garvin, Tom Shapiro	3:27
3.	"As Long as There's a Heartbeat"	David Powelson	3:17
4.	"Don't Go Out" (duet with T. Graham Brown)	Radney Foster, Bill Lloyd	3:15
5.	"There's a Tennessee Woman / Ben's Song"	Tanya Tucker, Gary Stewart	3:37
6.	"Goodbye Baby"	Paul Davis	3:27
7.	"It Won't Be Me"	Shapiro, Chris Waters	2:56
8.	"Your Old Magic"	Tony Martin, Troy Martin	3:12
9.	"Walking Shoes"	Paul Kennerley	2:38
10.	"Oh What It Did to Me"	Jerry Crutchfield	3:31
Total length:			31:26

== Production ==
- Produced By Jerry Crutchfield
- Engineer: Jim Cotton

== Personnel ==
- Tanya Tucker - lead vocals
- Eddie Bayers, Paul Leim, Harry Stinson - drums, percussion
- Bob Wray - bass guitar
- Roy Huskey Jr. - upright bass
- Mitch Humphries, Matt Rollings - keyboards
- Dennis Burnside - piano
- Mike Lawler - synthesizer
- Mark Casstevens, Steve Gibson, Don Potter, Brent Rowan, Reggie Young - guitar
- Paul Franklin, Sonny Garrish - steel guitar
- Terry McMillan - harmonica
- Beth Nielsen Chapman, Louis Dean Nunley, Wayland Patton, Dennis Wilson, Curtis Young, Liana Young - backing vocals

== Charts ==
=== Weekly charts ===
Chart (1990)	Peak position
US Top Country Albums (Billboard)	18

=== Year-end charts ===
Chart (1990)	Position
US Top Country Albums (Billboard)	52
