= Walking Shoes =

- Cassette single cover art

Single by Tanya Tucker

from the album Tennessee Woman
- B-side: "This Heart of Mine"
- Released: March 24, 1990
- Genre: Country
- Length: 2:38
- Label: Capitol Nashville
- Songwriter: Paul Kennerley
- Producer: Jerry Crutchfield

Tanya Tucker singles chronology
"My Arms Stay Open All Night" (1989)	"Walking Shoes" (1990)	"Don't Go Out" (1990)

"Walking Shoes" is a song written by Paul Kennerley, and recorded by American country music artist Tanya Tucker. It was released in March 1990 as the first single from the album Tennessee Woman. The song reached #3 on the Billboard Hot Country Singles & Tracks chart.

== Cover versions ==
The song was also recorded by Outlaw (Terry Pugh) on his 2012 album "Old Friends" ...

== Chart performance ==
Chart (1990)	Peak position
Canada Country Singles (RPM)	2
US Hot Country Songs (Billboard)	3

=== Year-end charts ===
Chart (1990)	Position
Canada Country Tracks (RPM)	47
US Country Songs (Billboard)	41
