= The Games of the XXVII Olympiad 2000: Music from the Opening Ceremony =

Compilation album by various artists
- Released: 18 September 2000
- Recorded: Summer 1999
- Genres: Classical, electronic, folk, world, country, funk/soul, pop, rock
- Label: Sony Music BMG
- Producers: SOCOG, Ross Fraser

The Games of the XXVII Olympiad 2000: Music from the Opening Ceremony is a compilation album of music from the 2000 Summer Olympics opening ceremony, released in 2000.

== Theme ==
The program celebrated a wide collection of exclusively Australian artists and composers from many different backgrounds. There was a focus on contemporary classical composers, such as Elena Kats-Chernin and Chong Lim, film composers such as Bruce Rowland and David Hirschfelder, Jazz artists such as James Morrison, Indigenous songlines arranged by David Page, House music from Peewee Ferris and pop from John Foreman, Paul Begaud, John Gillard, Trevor White, Vanessa Corish & Wayne Tester. The opening piece to the artistic section, Deep Sea Dreaming, is still regularly performed by Kats-Chernin and by treble choirs in Australia.

The Sydney Symphony Orchestra was the orchestra at the ceremony and performed most of the works in the program, although some pieces performed by the Melbourne Symphony Orchestra was noted in the program and CD. It came to light in August 2008 that the Sydney Symphony mimed its performance during the opening ceremony to tracks prerecorded by both orchestras, after an incident at the 2008 Opening Ceremony revealed that a girl lip-synched a song and used another girl's voice. Morrison's Fanfare performance was also mimed on the night. All performances were recorded in either the Sydney Opera House Concert Hall or Studios 301 in Sydney. All voice artists performed live.

The Australian bush song "Waltzing Matilda" became a musical motif as performed as a sing-a-long during the Prelude, quoted in Morrison's Fanfare and performed by the Sydney 2000 Band.

The Flame was released as a single two weeks before the performance.

== Release ==
The soundtrack The Games of the XXVII Olympiad: Official Music from the Opening Ceremony was released on 18 September. The music album peaked at number 1 on the ARIA Charts and was certified 2× platinum in Australia. It was nominated at the 2001 ARIA Awards for Best Original Soundtrack Album.

Music which was not on the official soundtrack included a remix of Eternity by Peewee Ferris which was played at the end of the Artistic section, the Marching Band arrangements of Olympic themes by Ken Dye, and an excerpt from the orchestral work The Warriors: Music to an Imaginary Ballet by Percy Grainger, which was played during the rising of the cauldron.

== Track listing ==
The Games of the XXVII Olympiad 2000: Music from the Opening Ceremony track listing
No.	Title	Writer(s)	Performer	Length
1.	"The Flame"	John Foreman	Tina Arena, Sydney Children's Choir & the Melbourne Symphony Orchestra	3:31
2.	"Dare To Dream"	Paul Begaud, Vanessa Corish & Wayne Tester	John Farnham & Olivia Newton-John	5:16
3.	"Heroes Live Forever"	John Gillard & Trevor White	Vanessa Amorosi	4:34
4.	"Under Southern Skies"	Damien Halloran & Maria Millward	Nikki Webster & Sing 2001 Choir	3:23
5.	"Countdown Fanfare"	Richard Mills	Sydney Symphony Orchestra	1:07
6.	"The Man from Snowy River — Olympic Version"	Bruce Rowland	Sydney Symphony Orchestra	3:29
7.	"Fanfare"	James Morrison	James Morrison & Swing City	1:34
8.	"Advance Australia Fair"	Peter Dodds McCormick, Arranged by David Stanhope	Human Nature, Julie Anthony, James Morrison, Sydney Symphony Orchestra, Sydney Philharmonia Choirs, Sydney University Musical Society & Sing 2001 Choir	3:35
9.	"Deep Sea Dreaming"	Elena Kats-Chernin	Sydney Children's Choir & the Sydney Symphony Orchestra	4:07
10.	"Awakening"	Djakapurra Munyarryun, David Page, Stephen Francis, Peggy Misi, Elma Kris, Matthew Doyle, & Don Nindihirribala	Djakapurra Munyarryun, Don Nindihirribala, David Page with Ngaanyatjarra, Pitjantjatjara & Yankunytjatjara Women & Doonooch Dance Co	7:02
11.	"Fire"	Michael Askill	Michael Askill & Fire Percussion	2:42
12.	"Nature"	Chong Lim	Sydney Symphony Orchestra, Melbourne Chorale & National Boys Choir of Australia	6:45
13.	"Tin"	Ian Cooper, John Frohlich, John Gillard & Trevor White, Paul Grabowsky	Ian Cooper, John Frolich, Melbourne Symphony Orchestra & National Boys Choir	8:21
14.	"Arrivals"	Pee Wee Ferris	Pee Wee Ferris	5:16
15.	"Eternity"	David Hirschfelder	David Hirschfelder	6:23
16.	"Games 2000 Fanfare"	David Stanhope	Sydney Symphony Orchestra	0:37
17.	"The Olympic Hymn"	Spyridon Samaras & Kostis Palamas	The Millenium Choir of the Greek Orthodox Archdiocese of Australia & The Sydney Symphony Orchestra	2:55
18.	"Tibi Omnes from Te Deum"	Hector Berlioz	Sydney Symphony Orchestra, Sydney Philharmonia Choirs, Sydney University Musical Society, Sing 2001 Choir & Sydney Children's Choir	8:20

== Charts ==
=== Weekly charts ===
Weekly chart performance for The Games of the XXVII Olympiad 2000: Music from the Opening Ceremony
Chart (2000)	Peak position
Australian Albums (ARIA)	1

=== Year-end chart ===
Year-end chart performance for The Games of the XXVII Olympiad 2000: Music from the Opening Ceremony
Chart (2000)	Rank
Australia (ARIA)	15

== Certifications ==
Certifications for The Games of the XXVII Olympiad 2000: Music from the Opening Ceremony
Region	Certification	Certified units/sales
Australia (ARIA)	2× Platinum	140,000^{^}
^{^} Shipments figures based on certification alone.
