= Down to My Last Teardrop =

Single by Tanya Tucker

from the album What Do I Do with Me
- B-side: "If Your Heart Ain't Busy Tonight"
- Released: June 22, 1991
- Genre: Country
- Length: 3:28
- Label: Capitol
- Songwriter: Paul Davis
- Producer: Jerry Crutchfield

Tanya Tucker singles chronology
"Oh What It Did to Me" (1991)	"Down to My Last Teardrop" (1991)	"(Without You) What Do I Do with Me" (1991)

"Down to My Last Teardrop" is a song written by Paul Davis, and recorded by American country music artist Tanya Tucker. It was released in June 1991 as the first single from Tucker's album What Do I Do with Me. The song reached number 2 on the Billboard Hot Country Singles & Tracks chart in September 1991, behind Brooks & Dunn's "Brand New Man" and number 1 on the RPM Country Tracks chart in Canada.

== Chart performance ==
Chart (1991)	Peak position
Canada Country Singles (RPM)	1
US Hot Country Songs (Billboard)	2

=== Year-end charts ===
Chart (1991)	Position
Canada Country Tracks (RPM)	39
US Country Songs (Billboard)	27
