= It Won't Be Me =

Single by Tanya Tucker

from the album Tennessee Woman
- Released: October 20, 1990
- Genre: Country
- Length: 2:50
- Label: Capitol Nashville
- Songwriters: Tom Shapiro, Chris Waters
- Producer: Jerry Crutchfield

Tanya Tucker singles chronology
"Don't Go Out" (1990)	"It Won't Be Me" (1990)	"Oh What It Did to Me" (1991)

"It Won't Be Me" is a song written by Tom Shapiro and Chris Waters, and recorded by American country music artist Tanya Tucker. It was released in October 1990 as the third single from the album Tennessee Woman. The song reached #6 on the Billboard Hot Country Singles & Tracks chart.

== Chart performance ==
Chart (1990–1991)	Peak position
Canada Country Singles (RPM)	6
US Hot Country Songs (Billboard)	6

=== Year-end charts ===
Chart (1991)	Position
Canada Country Tracks (RPM)	96
US Country Songs (Billboard)	73
