= What Do I Do with Me =

Studio album by Tanya Tucker
- Released: July 2, 1991
- Recorded: 1990–91
- Studios: Emerald Sound Studios, House of David, Javelina Studios, The Music Mill, Nightingale Recording Studios, and Sound Stage Studios, Nashville, TN
- Genre: Country
- Length: 34:45
- Label: Capitol
- Producer: Jerry Crutchfield

Tanya Tucker chronology
Greatest Hits Encore (1990)	What Do I Do with Me (1991)	Can't Run from Yourself (1992)

Singles from What Do I Do with Me
- 1. "Down to My Last Teardrop" Released: June 4, 1991; 2. "(Without You) What Do I Do with Me" Released: September 24, 1991; 3. "Some Kind of Trouble" Released: February 11, 1992; 4. "If Your Heart Ain't Busy Tonight" Released: May 1992

Professional ratings
Review scores
Source	Rating
AllMusic	3/5 stars
Chicago Tribune	3.5/4 stars
The Rolling Stone Album Guide	4/5 stars

What Do I Do with Me is the 19th studio album by American country music singer Tanya Tucker, released on July 2, 1991 as her final album for Capitol Records, after that album's release, Tucker exited Capitol's roster in favor of Liberty Records in 1992. It was her highest-placing on the Billboard charts reaching #6 in the Country albums and #48 on the Pop albums categories. The album produced four Top Five hits on the Hot Country Songs charts: "(Without You) What Do I Do with Me" and "Down to My Last Teardrop" both at number two, "Some Kind of Trouble" at number three, and "If Your Heart Ain't Busy Tonight" at number four. The track "Everything That You Want" was later covered by Reba McEntire for her 1994 album, Read My Mind.

== Track listing ==
No.	Title	Writer(s)	Length
1.	"If Your Heart Ain't Busy Tonight"	Tom Shapiro, Chris Waters	3:02
2.	"Some Kind of Trouble"	Mike Reid, Brent Maher, Don Potter	3:51
3.	"(Without You) What Do I Do with Me"	Royce Porter, L. David Lewis, David Chamberlain	2:55
4.	"Down to My Last Teardrop"	Paul Davis	3:28
5.	"Everything That You Want"	Randy Sharp, Jack Wesley Routh	3:42
6.	"Trail of Tears"	Paul Kennerley	3:02
7.	"Bidding America Goodbye (The Auction)"	Jamie O'Hara	3:21
8.	"Time and Distance"	Donny Lowery, Sharp	3:48
9.	"He Was Just Leaving"	Lisa Angelle, Walt Aldridge	3:40
10.	"Right About Now"	Rick Bowles, Jeff Silbar	3:38

== Personnel ==
As listed in liner notes.

- Tanya Tucker - vocals
- Eddie Bayers - drums
- Mark Casstevens - acoustic guitar
- Beth Nielsen Chapman - backing vocals
- Paul Davis - backing vocals
- Sonny Garrish - steel guitar
- Steve Gibson - acoustic guitar, electric guitar
- Greg Gordon - backing vocals
- Rob Hajacos - fiddle
- Jim Horn - saxophone
- Mitch Humphries - keyboards
- David Innis - synthesizer
- Mike Lawler - synthesizer
- Paul Leim - drums
- Liana Manis - backing vocals
- Donna McElroy - backing vocals
- Terry McMillan - harmonica
- Wayland Patton - backing vocals
- Brent Rowan - electric guitar
- Bob Wray - bass guitar
- Curtis Young - backing vocals

== Charts ==
=== Weekly charts ===
Chart (1991)	Peak position
Canadian Country Albums (RPM)	10
US Billboard 200	48
US Top Country Albums (Billboard)	6

=== Year-end charts ===
Chart (1991)	Position
US Top Country Albums (Billboard)	44
Chart (1992)	Position
US Top Country Albums (Billboard)	15
