= It's a Little Too Late (Tanya Tucker song) =

Single by Tanya Tucker

from the album Can't Run from Yourself
- B-side: "Rainbow Rider"; "Cadillac Ranch" (by Chris LeDoux)
- Released: January 1993
- Recorded: 1992
- Genre: Country
- Length: 2:39
- Label: Liberty
- Songwriters: Pat Terry; Roger Murrah
- Producer: Jerry Crutchfield

Tanya Tucker singles chronology
"Two Sparrows in a Hurricane" (1992)	"It's a Little Too Late" (1993)	"Tell Me About It" (1993)

"It's a Little Too Late" is a song written by Roger Murrah and Pat Terry, and recorded by American country music singer Tanya Tucker. It was released in January 1993 as the second single from her album Can't Run from Yourself. It peaked at number 2 on the Hot Country Singles & Tracks (now Hot Country Songs) chart in March, behind George Strait's "Heartland". It also reached number 12 on the Bubbling Under Hot 100.

== Critical reception ==
Mario Tarradell of The Miami Herald gave Can't Run from Yourself a favorable review, noting this single as being "all attitude" and "rocking".

== Charts ==
=== Weekly charts ===
Chart (1993)	Peak position
Canada Country Singles (RPM)	3
US Bubbling Under Hot 100 (Billboard)	12
US Hot Country Songs (Billboard)	2

=== Year-end charts ===
Chart (1993)	Position
Canada Country Tracks (RPM)	70
US Country Songs (Billboard)	61
