= Tell Me About It =

Single by Tanya Tucker with Delbert McClinton

from the album Can't Run from Yourself
- B-side: "What Do They Know"
- Released: April 17, 1993
- Genre: Country
- Length: 3:45
- Label: Liberty
- Songwriters: Bill LaBounty, Pat McLaughlin
- Producer: Jerry Crutchfield

Tanya Tucker singles chronology
"It's a Little Too Late" (1993)	"Tell Me About It" (1993)	"Soon" (1993)

"Tell Me About It" is a song written by Bill LaBounty and Pat McLaughlin, and recorded by American country music artist Tanya Tucker and singer-songwriter Delbert McClinton as a duet. It was released in April 1993 as the third single from Tucker's album Can't Run from Yourself. The song reached #4 on the Billboard Hot Country Singles & Tracks chart.

== Chart performance ==
Chart (1993)	Peak position
Canada Country Singles (RPM)	3
US Hot Country Songs (Billboard)	4

=== Year-end charts ===
Chart (1993)	Position
Canada Country Tracks (RPM)	17
US Country Songs (Billboard)	52
