= Two Sparrows in a Hurricane =

Single by Tanya Tucker

from the album Can't Run from Yourself
- B-side: "Danger Ahead"
- Released: September 1992
- Genre: Country
- Length: 4:08
- Label: Liberty
- Songwriter: Mark Alan Springer
- Producer: Jerry Crutchfield

Tanya Tucker singles chronology
"If Your Heart Ain't Busy Tonight" (1992)	"Two Sparrows in a Hurricane" (1992)	"It's a Little Too Late" (1993)

"Two Sparrows in a Hurricane" is a song written by Mark Alan Springer and recorded by American country music artist Tanya Tucker. It was released in September 1992 as the first single from the album Can't Run from Yourself. The song reached No. 2 on the Billboard Hot Country Singles & Tracks chart in December, behind George Strait's "I Cross My Heart".

== Music video ==
The music video was directed by Joanne Gardner and premiered in October 1992. It shows Tucker performing the song against a rose-colored background and a black background, as well as a storyline involving a couple in three time periods in an apartment bedroom. First, the young woman walks to an open window as the man comes through to see her. He gives her flowers, which she puts on the nightstand. The next scene shows them as parents with two kids (one of whom is a newborn) playing around on the bed. The man sees the woman is tired and tries to talk to her, but she just lets it go. She is then seen kissing the now dressed man. The final scene shows the couple as elderly and living in the same apartment. The woman is reading as the man comes in. He picks up his glasses and a newspaper and sits beside her. The man is then seen in bed; she comes over and kisses him and they smile at each other. It ends with a dedication to Beau and Juanita Tucker (Tanya's parents) who celebrated their 50th wedding anniversary the year the video was made.

== Chart performance ==
Chart (1992)	Peak position
Canada Country Singles (RPM)	2
US Hot Country Songs (Billboard)	2

=== Year-end charts ===
Chart (1992)	Position
Canada Country Tracks (RPM)	100

Chart (1993)	Position
Canada Country Tracks (RPM)	85
