= Oh What It Did to Me =

Single by Tanya Tucker

from the album Tennessee Woman
- Released: February 23, 1991
- Genre: Country
- Length: 3:31
- Label: Capitol
- Songwriter: Jerry Crutchfield
- Producer: Jerry Crutchfield

Tanya Tucker singles chronology
"It Won't Be Me" (1990)	"Oh What It Did to Me" (1991)	"Down to My Last Teardrop" (1991)

"Oh What It Did to Me" is a song written by Jerry Crutchfield, and recorded by American country music artist Tanya Tucker. It was released in February 1991 as the fourth single from her album Tennessee Woman. The song reached number 12 on the Billboard Hot Country Singles & Tracks chart in June 1991.

== Chart performance ==
Chart (1991)	Peak position
Canada Country Singles (RPM)	21
US Hot Country Songs (Billboard)	12
