= Bob Regan =

American country music songwriter

Background information
- Born: Robert Joseph Regan; Sacramento, California, United States
- Genres: Country
- Occupation: Songwriter
- Instruments: guitar, bass guitar
- Years active: 1972–present
- Website: bobregan.com

Robert Joseph Regan is a Grammy nominated American country music songwriter. His chart credits include "Til Love Comes Again" by Reba McEntire, "Busy Man" by Billy Ray Cyrus, "Your Everything" by Keith Urban, "Soon" by Tanya Tucker, "Thinkin' About You" by Trisha Yearwood, "Running Out of Reasons to Run" by Rick Trevino, "Something About a Woman" by Jake Owen, "Dig Two Graves" by Randy Travis, and many others. His songs have been recorded by artists ranging from cowboy legend Roy Rogers to Kenny Rogers, from Hank Williams Jr. to Andy Williams.

Regan was a recording artist on Curb Records in the early 1980s, a studio musician in Nashville, Tennessee, a guitarist on the Grand Ole Opry (with Jeanne Pruitt,) and was a three-term President of the Board of the Nashville Songwriters Association International as well as their Legislative Chair. In that role in 2006, he helped pass the Songwriters Capital Gains Tax Equity Act. Regan also taught as an adjunct professor at Belmont University in the inaugural year of their songwriting program.

In 2012, Regan founded Operation Song, a program which brings professional songwriters together with veterans and active duty military to help them tell their stories in song. To date there have been over 1800 songs written with veterans of World War II to those currently serving.

In 2023, Regan began releasing solo written and self produced singles as an artist on his own label, Yessirree Bob Records.

In 2024, Regan received the William Randolph Hearst Award for Journalism and Mass Communication for his work with Operation Song and for his contributions to the Boston Globe.

== Early life ==
Regan was born in Sacramento, California, was raised in South Lake Tahoe. in 1972, he received a BA degree in Psychology from the University of California, Davis.

== Chart singles written by Bob Regan ==
The following is a list of Bob Regan compositions that were chart hits.

Year	Single Title	Recording Artist	Chart Positions	
Year	Single Title	Recording Artist	Billboard Hot 100	Billboard Country
1987	Routine	The Kendalls		54
1989	'Til Love Comes Again co-written with Ed Hill	Reba McEntire		4
1990	We've Got It Made co-written with Sandy Ramos	Lee Greenwood		14
1993	Soon co-written with Casey Kelly	Tanya Tucker		2
1994	You Just Watch Me co-written with Rick Giles	Tanya Tucker		20
1995	Sometimes I Forget co-written with Billy Kirsch	Doug Stone		41
1995	Yeah Buddy co-written with Mark D. Sanders	Jeff Carson		69
1995	Thinkin' About You co-written with Tom Shapiro	Trisha Yearwood	120	1
1996	She Can't Save Him co-written with Liz Hengber	Lisa Brokop		55
1996	Someday co-written with Steve Azar and A. J. Masters	Steve Azar		51
1997	More Than I Wanted to Know co-written with Mike Noble	Regina Regina		53
1997	Running Out of Reasons to Run co-written with George Teren	Rick Trevino		1
1997	The Swing co-written with Robert Ellis Orrall	James Bonamy		31
1999	Ain't Enough Roses co-written with Lisa Brokop and Sam Hogin	Lisa Brokop		65
1999	Tore Up from the Floor Up co-written with J. B. Rudd	Wade Hayes		57
1999	Busy Man co-written with George Teren	Billy Ray Cyrus	46	3
1999	Everytime I Cry co-written with Karen Staley	Terri Clark	69	12
1999	Steam co-written with Lewis Anderson	Ty Herndon	83	18
2000	I Want to Know (Everything There Is to Know About You) co-written with Lewis Anderson	Mark Wills		33
2000	Your Everything co-written with Chris Lindsey	Keith Urban	51	4
2008	Something About a Woman co-written with Jimmy Ritchey and Jake Owen	Jake Owen	104	15
2009	I'll Be That co-written with Jimmy Wayne and Kevin Paige	Jimmy Wayne		46
2009	Fight Like a Girl co-written with Kristy Osmunson and Kelley Shepard	Bomshel		30

== Awards ==
2012	Pray About Everything	Dove Award	Best Country Recorded Song	Nominated
2009	Dig Two Graves	Grammy Awards	Best Country Song	Nominated
2008	Something About a Woman	ASCAP	Most Performed Song	Won
2000	Your Everything	ASCAP	Most Performed Song	Won
1999	Steam	ASCAP	Most Performed Song	Won
1999	Busy Man	ASCAP	Most Performed Song	Won
1999	Everytime I Cry	ASCAP	Most Performed Song	Won
1997	Running Out of Reasons to Run	ASCAP	Most Performed Song	Won
1995	"Thinkin' About You"	ASCAP	Most Performed Song	Won
1993	Soon	ASCAP	Most Performed Song	Won
1990	We've Got It Made	ASCAP	Most Performed Song	Won
1989	'Til Love Comes Again	ASCAP	Most Performed Song	Won
