= Jerry Crutchfield =

American singer-songwriter and record producer (1934–2022)

Jerry Crutchfield (August 10, 1934 – January 11, 2022) was an American country and pop record producer, songwriter, and musician. He was a publishing and record label executive. He recorded for RCA Victor Records with vocal group The Country Gentlemen, later known as The Escorts. He received multiple Country Music Association's (CMA) "Song of the Year" award nominations for his work as producer, winning the award twice as well as having been a co-producer of a CMA Album of the Year. He was also nominated for the Dove Award for three Gospel/Christian albums, having won the award for Traditional Gospel Record of the Year by The Hemphills. Crutchfield has served as a member of the national board of trustees for the National Academy of Recording Arts and Sciences (NARAS), along with the board of directors of the Nashville chapter of NARAS, the Country Music Association, and the Gospel Music Association.

== Early life ==
Crutchfield was born in Paducah, Kentucky, United States. He attended Murray State University. His brother, Jan Crutchfield, was a songwriter.

== Career ==
Notable albums produced by Crutchfield that obtained gold, platinum, and multi-platinum status include those by Lee Greenwood, Tanya Tucker, Chris LeDoux, Tracy Byrd, and Lisa Brokop. He also produced artists such as Anne Murray, Dottie West, Tammy Wynette, Glen Campbell, Brenda Lee, Buck Owens, Jake Hess, Larry Gatlin, The Gatlin Brothers, Pearl River and Mylon LeFevre. He was also known for producing the top 10 pop hit, "Please Come to Boston" recorded by Dave Loggins.

Nominated multiple times as producer of the Country Music Association's (CMA) "Song of the Year" award, Crutchfield has won that honor twice as well as having been a co-producer of a CMA Album of the Year. He was also nominated for the Dove Award for three Gospel/Christian albums, having won the award for Traditional Gospel Record of the Year by The Hemphills.

As an award-winning songwriter, Crutchfield had over 150 songs recorded by such major artists as Elvis Presley, The Crickets, Skeeter Davis, Brenda Lee, Eddy Arnold, Tanya Tucker, Lee Greenwood, Lou Rawls, Ricky Nelson, Tammy Wynette, Ernest Tubb, Faron Young, Charley Pride, and Lefty Frizzell. His hit song "My Whole World Is Falling Down" was a top ten pop hit by Brenda Lee, and a significant European hit for French singer Sylvie Vartan.

Crutchfield is credited with establishing MCA Music Publishing as a major publishing house, and signing and working with writers such as Dave Loggins, Don Schlitz, Gary Burr, Rob Crosby and Mark Nesler. During his 25-year career at MCA, Crutchfield left to serve as Executive Vice President/General Manager of Capitol Records for four years. He then returned to MCA Music Publishing for a three-year period as president of its Nashville division.

He served as national trustee for The National Academy of Recording Arts and Sciences (NARAS), and served on the board of directors of the Nashville chapter of NARAS, the Country Music Association, and the Gospel Music Association.

== Death ==
Crutchfield died on January 11, 2022, at the age of 87.
