= Tanya Tucker singles discography =

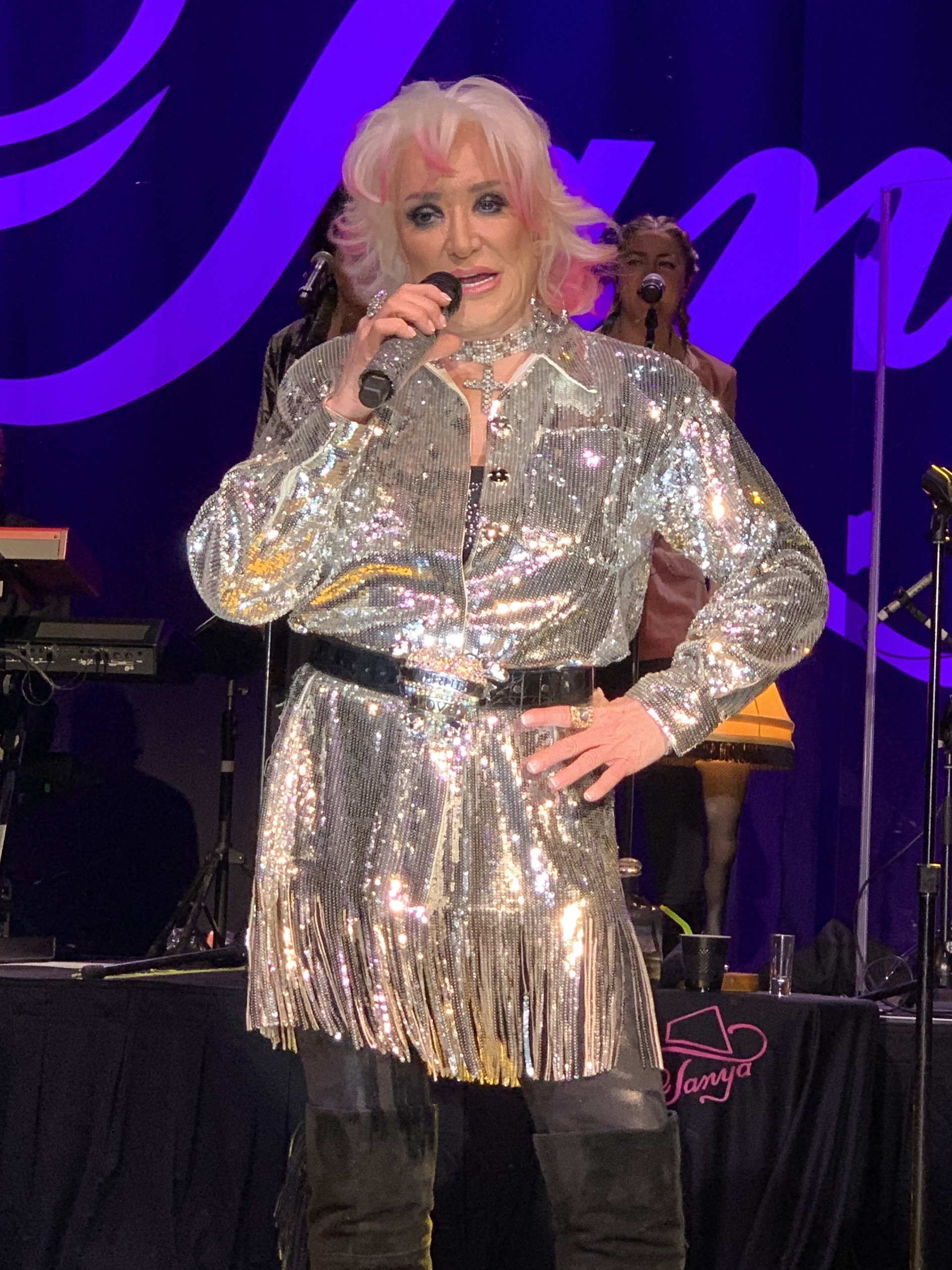
- Tucker performing at Graceland in 2020.
- As lead artist: 89
- As featured artist: 6
- Promotional singles: 2
- Other charted songs: 1
- Lead music videos: 18
- Featured music videos: 3

The singles discography of American country artist, Tanya Tucker, contains 89 lead singles, six featured singles, two promotional singles, one additional charting song, 18 lead music videos and three featured music videos. Tucker's career was launched in 1972 when she was 13 years old. That year, her debut single "Delta Dawn" was released. It went to number six on the America's Billboard Hot Country Songs chart and number 72 on the Hot 100. It was followed by three consecutive number one Billboard singles in 1973: "What's Your Mama's Name", "Blood Red and Goin' Down" and "Would You Lay with Me (In a Field of Stone)".

In 1975, "Lizzie and the Rainman" reached charting positions in multiple fields, including topping the Billboard and RPM country charts. It also charted the top ten on both the Billboard and RPM adult contemporary charts. Both "San Antonio Stroll" and "Here's Some Love" topped the country charts through 1976. In 1978, Tucker reached the country top five with "Texas (When I Die)". Tucker's commercial success began to wane in the early eighties. While she had three top ten Billboard singles, most of her releases reached positions outside the top 40.

In 1986, she returned to the top five with the single "One Love at a Time". It was followed by a string of American and Canadian top-ten country singles. This included six chart-topping songs: "Just Another Love", "I'll Come Back as Another Woman", "I Won't Take Less Than Your Love", "If It Don't Come Easy", "Strong Enough to Bend" and "Highway Robbery". As Tucker's career transitioned into the nineties, she continued having commercial success. While the majority of her singles did not top the charts, they reached the top ten. This included "Walking Shoes", "Down to My Last Teardrop" and "Two Sparrows in a Hurricane". Tucker reached the country songs top ten for the last time in 1997 with "Little Things". She started recording less beginning in the new millennium. Her most recent charting single was 2019's "Bring My Flowers Now".

== As lead artist ==
=== 1970s ===
List of singles, with selected chart positions, showing year released and album name
Title	Year	Peak chart positions							Certifications (sales threshold)	Album
Title	Year	US	US AC	US Cou.	AUS	CAN	CAN AC	CAN Cou.	Certifications (sales threshold)	Album
"Delta Dawn"	1972	72	—	6	—	—	—	3	RIAA: Gold; ARIA: Gold; RMNZ: Gold	Delta Dawn
"Love's the Answer"	1972	—	—	5	—	—	—	1		Delta Dawn
"The Jamestown Ferry"	1972	—	—	5	—	—	—	1		Delta Dawn
"What's Your Mama's Name"	1973	86	—	1	—	—	—	1		What's Your Mama's Name
"Blood Red and Goin' Down"	1973	74	—	1	—	—	—	1		What's Your Mama's Name
"Would You Lay with Me (In a Field of Stone)"	1973	46	—	1	59	54	—	7		Would You Lay with Me (In a Field of Stone)
"The Man That Turned My Mama On"	1974	86	—	4	—	—	—	10		Would You Lay with Me (In a Field of Stone)
"I Believe the South Is Gonna Rise Again"	1974	—	—	18	—	—	—	10		Would You Lay with Me (In a Field of Stone)
"Lizzie and the Rainman"	1975	37	7	1	85	66	2	1		Tanya Tucker
"Spring"	1975	—	—	18	—	—	—	11		You Are So Beautiful
"San Antonio Stroll"	1975	—	—	1	—	—	—	2		Tanya Tucker
"Traveling Salesman" (Note: Released in the United Kingdom only.)	1975	—	—	—	—	—	—	—		Tanya Tucker
"Greener Than the Grass (We Laid On)"	1975	—	—	23	—	—	—	20		Non-album single
"Don't Believe My Heart Can Stand Another You"	1975	—	—	4	—	—	—	1		Lovin' and Learnin'
"Ain't That a Shame"	1976	—	—	—	—	—	—	—		Lovin' and Learnin'
"You've Got Me to Hold On To"	1976	—	—	3	—	—	—	3		Lovin' and Learnin'
"Pride of Franklin County" (Note: Released in Japan only.)	1976	—	—	—	—	—	—	—		Lovin' and Learnin'
"Here's Some Love"	1976	82	25	1	—	33	33	2		Here's Some Love
"Hello, Mr. Sunshine" (Note: Released in Japan only.)	1976	—	—	—	—	—	—	—		Here's Some Love
"Short Cut"	1976	—	—	—	—	—	—	—		Here's Some Love
"Ridin' Rainbows"	1976	—	—	12	—	—	—	7		Ridin' Rainbows
"It's a Cowboy Lovin' Night"	1977	—	—	7	—	—	—	2		Ridin' Rainbows
"A Rock 'n' Roll Girl from Alaska" (Note: Released in Japan only.)	1977	—	—	—	—	—	—	—		Non-album single
"You Are So Beautiful"	1977	—	—	40	—	—	—	29		You Are So Beautiful
"Dancing the Night Away"	1977	—	—	16	—	—	—	19		Ridin' Rainbows
"Save Me"	1978	— (Note: "Save Me" did not enter the Hot 100, but peaked at number 5 on Bubbling Under Hot 100 Singles, which acts as a 25-song extension of the Hot 100.)	—	86	—	—	—	89		Non-album single
"Not Fade Away" (Note: "Not Fade Away" was released as a double A-side single with "Texas (When I Die)". "Not Fade Away" was aimed at pop stations and "Texas (When I Die)" was aimed at country stations.)	1978	70	—	—	—	—	—	—		TNT
"Texas (When I Die)" (Note: "Texas (When I Die)" was released as a double A-side single with "Not Fade Away". "Texas (When I Die)" was aimed at country stations and "Not Fade Away" was aimed at pop stations.)	1978	—	—	5	—	—	—	3		TNT
"I'm the Singer, You're the Song" (Note: "I'm the Singer, You're the Song" was released as a double A-side single with "Lover Goodbye". "I'm the Singer, You're the Song" was aimed at country stations and "Lover Goodbye" was aimed at pop stations.)	1979	—	—	18	—	—	25	6		TNT
"Lover Goodbye" (Note: "Lover Goodbye" was released as a double A-side single with "I'm the Singer, You're the Song". "Lover Goodbye" was aimed at pop stations and "I'm the Singer, You're the Song" was aimed at country stations.)	1979	— (Note: "Lover Goodbye" did not enter the Hot 100, but peaked at number 3 on Bubbling Under Hot 100 Singles, which acts as a 25-song extension of the Hot 100.)	—	—	—	—	—	—		TNT
"Lay Back in the Arms of Someone"	1979	—	—	—	—	—	—	—		Tear Me Apart
"—" denotes a release that did not chart or was not released in that territory.

=== 1980s ===
List of singles, with selected chart positions, showing year released and album name
Title	Year	Peak chart positions		Album
Title	Year	US Cou.	CAN Cou.	Album
"Better Late Than Never"	1980	—	60	Tear Me Apart
"Pecos Promenade"	1980	10	7	Smokey and the Bandit II: Original Soundtrack
"Dream Lover" (with Glen Campbell)	1980	59	48	Dreamlovers
"Can I See You Tonight"	1980	4	4	Dreamlovers
"Love Knows We Tried"	1981	40	40	Dreamlovers
"Should I Do It"	1981	50	16	Should I Do It
"Rodeo Girls"	1981	83	—	Should I Do It
"Somebody Buy This Cowgirl a Beer"	1982	—	—	Live
"Cry"	1982	77	—	Changes
"Feel Right"	1982	10	—	Changes
"Changes"	1983	41	—	Changes
"Baby I'm Yours"	1983	22	—	Changes
"One Love at a Time"	1986	3	1	Girls Like Me
"Just Another Love"	1986	1	1	Girls Like Me
"I'll Come Back as Another Woman"	1986	2	1	Girls Like Me
"It's Only Over for You"	1987	8	12	Girls Like Me
"Love Me Like You Used To"	1987	2	3	Love Me Like You Used To
"I Won't Take Less Than Your Love" (with Paul Davis and Paul Overstreet)	1987	1	10	Love Me Like You Used To
"If It Don't Come Easy"	1988	1	—	Love Me Like You Used To
"Strong Enough to Bend"	1988	1	2	Strong Enough to Bend
"Highway Robbery"	1988	2	1	Strong Enough to Bend
"Call on Me"	1989	4	5	Strong Enough to Bend
"Daddy and Home"	1989	27	25	Strong Enough to Bend
"My Arms Stay Open All Night"	1989	2	2	Greatest Hits
"—" denotes a release that did not chart or was not released in that territory.

=== 1990s ===
List of singles, with selected chart positions, showing year released and album name
Title	Year	Peak chart positions			Album
Title	Year	US Bub.	US Cou.	CAN Cou.	Album
"Walking Shoes"	1990	—	3	2	Tennessee Woman
"Don't Go Out" (with T. Graham Brown)	1990	—	6	11	Tennessee Woman
"It Won't Be Me"	1990	—	6	6	Tennessee Woman
"Oh What It Did to Me"	1991	—	12	21	Tennessee Woman
"Down to My Last Teardrop"	1991	—	2	1	What Do I Do with Me
"(Without You) What Do I Do with Me"	1991	—	2	2	What Do I Do with Me
"Some Kind of Trouble"	1992	—	3	15	What Do I Do with Me
"If Your Heart Ain't Busy Tonight"	1992	—	4	5	What Do I Do with Me
"Two Sparrows in a Hurricane"	1992	—	2	2	Can't Run from Yourself
"It's a Little Too Late"	1993	12	2	3	Can't Run from Yourself
"Tell Me About It" (with Delbert McClinton)	1993	—	4	3	Can't Run from Yourself
"Soon"	1993	—	2	15	Soon
"We Don't Have to Do This"	1994	—	11	16	Soon
"Hangin' In"	1994	—	4	17	Soon
"You Just Watch Me"	1994	—	20	14	Soon
"Between the Two of Them"	1995	—	27	26	Fire to Fire
"Find Out What's Happenin'"	1995	—	40	45	Fire to Fire
"Little Things"	1997	14	9	8	Complicated
"Ridin' Out the Heartache"	1997	—	45	81	Complicated
"—" denotes a release that did not chart or was not released in that territory.

=== 2000s–2020s ===
List of singles, with selected chart positions, showing year released and album name
Title	Year	Peak chart positions	Album
Title	Year	US Country	Album
"A Memory Like I'm Gonna Be"	2002	34	Tanya
"Old Weakness (Coming on Strong)"	2003	49	Tanya
"Love's Gonna Live Here" (with Jim Lauderdale)	2009	—	My Turn
"Merry Christmas Wherever You Are"	2011	—	Non-album single
"Forever Loving You"	2017	—	Non-album single
"The Wheels of Laredo"	2019	—	While I'm Livin'
"Hard Luck"	2019	—	While I'm Livin'
"The House That Built Me"	2019	—	While I'm Livin'
"Bring My Flowers Now"	2019	47	While I'm Livin'
"The Winner's Game"	2019	—	While I'm Livin'
"Bring My Flowers Now" (Live)	2019	—	Live from the Troubadour
"I'm on Fire"/"Ring of Fire" (Live)	2020	—	Live from the Troubadour
"Delta Dawn" (Live)	2020	—	Live from the Troubadour
"Pack Your Lies and Go"	2020	—	While I'm Livin'
"This Is Our Country" (with RuPaul)	2021	—	Non-album single
"Ready as I'll Never Be"	2022	—	Sweet Western Sound
"Kindness"	2023	—	Sweet Western Sound
"When the Rodeo Is Over (Where Does the Cowboy Go?)"	2023	—	Sweet Western Sound
"Breakfast in Birmingham" (featuring Brandi Carlile)	2023	—	Sweet Western Sound
"—" denotes a release that did not chart or was not released in that territory.

== As featured artist ==
List of singles, with selected chart positions, showing year released and album name
Title	Year	Peak chart positions			Album
Title	Year	US	US Cou.	CAN Cou.	Album
"Why Don't We Just Sleep on It Tonight" (Glen Campbell with Tanya Tucker)	1981	—	85	—	It's the World Gone Crazy
"One Big Family" (credited as the Heart of Nashville)	1985	—	61	—	—N/a
"Romeo" (credited as Dolly Parton & Friends)	1993	50	27	33	Slow Dancing with the Moon
"Good Ole Boys" (John Schneider featuring Tanya Tucker, Steve Wariner, John Coole, T.G. Sheppard, Jo-el Sonnier, Mathew Nelson, Gunnar Nelson, Heidi Newfield, Bobby Bare, and T. Graham Brown)	2018	—	—	—	The Odyssey: Vagabond
"You Better Hope You Die Young" (Hellbound Glory featuring Tanya Tucker)	2018	—	—	—	Pinball (Junkie Edition)
"Joan of Arkansas" (Lena Paige featuring Tanya Tucker)	2020	—	—	—	Roses in December
"—" denotes a release that did not chart or was not released in that territory.

== Promotional singles ==
List of promotional singles showing year released and album name
Title	Year	Album
"Winter Wonderland" (Note: Released for jukeboxes only.)	1993	Christmas for the 90's, Volume 1
"Something" (Note: Released for jukeboxes only.)	1995	Come Together: America Salutes the Beatles

== Other charted songs ==
List of songs, with selected chart positions, showing year released and album name
Title	Year	Peak chart positions	Album
Title	Year	US Country	Album
"Already Gone"	1993	75	Common Thread: The Songs of the Eagles

== Music videos ==
=== As lead artist ===
List of music videos as lead artist, showing year released and director
Title	Year	Director(s)	Ref.
"Just Another Love"	1986	John Beug; Reynaldo Villalobos	
"Love Me Like You Used To"	1987	Jack Cole	
"Strong Enough to Bend"	1988	Larry Boothby; John Lloyd Miller	
"Daddy and Home"	1989	Larry Boothby	
"Walking Shoes"	1990	Larry Boothby	
"Don't Go Out" (with T. Graham Brown)	1990	Jack Cole	
"Down to My Last Teardrop"	1991	Joanne Gardner	
"Some Kind of Trouble"	1992	Joanne Gardner	
"Two Sparrows in a Hurricane"	1992	Joanne Gardner	
"It's a Little Too Late"	1992	Joanne Gardner	
"Hangin' In"	1994	Joanne Gardner	
"Between the Two of Them"	1995	—N/a	
"Find Out What's Happenin'"	1995	—N/a	
"Little Things"	1997	Gerry Wenner	
"The Wheels of Laredo"	2019	Myriam Santos	
"Hard Luck"	2019	Chris Phelps	
"The House That Built Me"	2019	Beautiful Digital	
"Bring My Flowers Now"	2019	Trey Fanjoy	

=== As featured artist ===
List of music videos as featured artist, showing year released and director
Title	Year	Director(s)	Ref.
"One Big Family" (credited as the Heart of Nashville)	1985	Steve Von Hagel	
"Romeo" (Dolly Parton featuring Billy Ray Cyrus, Kathy Mattea, Mary Chapin Carpenter, Pam Tillis and Tanya Tucker)	1993	Randee St. Nicholas	
"You Better Hope You Die Young" (Hellbound Glory featuring Tanya Tucker)	2018	Bob Wayne	
"Rockin' Around the Christmas Tree" (Brenda Lee featuring Tanya Tucker and Trisha Yearwood)	2023	Running Bear	
