= List of songs written by Paul Overstreet =

American singer-songwriter Paul Overstreet has written a large number of songs for other artists. He had his first songwriting success in 1982 with "Same Ole Me" by George Jones featuring the Oak Ridge Boys. Other artists who have recorded his material include Randy Travis, Keith Whitley, Blake Shelton, Kenny Chesney, and the Judds.

== Songs ==
Year	Artist	Album	Song	Co-written with	US Country
1981	George Jones	Still the Same Ole Me	"Same Ole Me" (with The Oak Ridge Boys)		5
1984	Tammy Wynette		"Lonely Heart"		40
1985	The Forester Sisters	The Forester Sisters	"I Fell in Love Again Last Night"	Thom Schuyler	1
1985	The Forester Sisters	The Forester Sisters	"The Missing Part"	Don Schlitz	
1986	Marie Osmond	I Only Wanted You	"You're Still New to Me" (with Paul Davis)	Paul Davis	1
1986	Randy Travis	Storms of Life	"On the Other Hand"	Don Schlitz	1
1986	Randy Travis	Storms of Life	"Diggin' Up Bones"	Al Gore, Nat Stuckey	1
1986	Randy Travis	Storms of Life	"No Place Like Home"		2
1986	S-K-O	S-K-O	"You Can't Stop Love"	Thom Schuyler	9
1986	S-K-O	S-K-O	"Trains Make Me Lonesome"	Thom Schuyler	
1986	S-K-O	S-K-O	"Somebody's Doin' Me Right"	Dan Tyler, J. Fred Knobloch	
1986	S-K-O	S-K-O	"Love Is the Hero"	J. Fred Knobloch, Thom Schuyler	
1986	Tanya Tucker	Girls Like Me	"One Love at a Time"	Paul Davis	3
1987	The Forester Sisters	You Again	"You Again"	Don Schlitz	1
1987	Kathy Mattea	Untasted Honey	"The Battle Hymn of Love" (with Tim O'Brien)	Don Schlitz	9
1987	Michael Martin Murphey	Americana	"A Long Line of Love"	Thom Schuyler	1
1987	Randy Travis	Always & Forever	"My House"	Al Gore	
1987	Randy Travis	Always & Forever	"Forever and Ever, Amen"	Don Schlitz	1
1987	Tanya Tucker	Love Me Like You Used To	"I Won't Take Less Than Your Love" (with Paul Davis and Paul Overstreet)	Don Schlitz	1
1987	Tanya Tucker	Love Me Like You Used To	"I'll Tennessee You in My Dreams"	Don Schlitz	
1988	Keith Whitley	Don't Close Your Eyes	"When You Say Nothing at All"	Don Schlitz	1
1988	Lee Greenwood	This Is My Country	"I'll Be Lovin' You"	Don Schlitz	16
1988	Randy Travis	Old 8×10	"Deeper Than the Holler"	Don Schlitz	1
1989	Lionel Cartwright	Lionel Cartwright	"Like Father Like Son"	Don Schlitz	14
1989	Nitty Gritty Dirt Band	Will the Circle Be Unbroken: Volume Two	"And So It Goes" (with John Denver)	Don Schlitz	14
1989	Paul Overstreet	Sowin' Love	"Love Helps Those"		3
1989	Paul Overstreet	Sowin' Love	"All the Fun"	Taylor Dunn	5
1989	Paul Overstreet	Sowin' Love	"Call the Preacher"		
1989	Paul Overstreet	Sowin' Love	"Richest Man on Earth"	Don Schlitz	3
1989	Paul Overstreet	Sowin' Love	"Sowin' Love"	Don Schlitz	9
1989	Paul Overstreet	Sowin' Love	"Love Never Sleeps"		
1989	Paul Overstreet	Sowin' Love	"Dig Another Well"	Don Schlitz	
1989	Paul Overstreet	Sowin' Love	"Seein' My Father in Me"	Taylor Dunn	2
1989	Paul Overstreet	Sowin' Love	"What God Has Joined Together"	Paul Davis	
1989	Paul Overstreet	Sowin' Love	"Homemaker"	Eugene D. Tyler	
1989	Paul Overstreet	Sowin' Love	"Neath the Light of Your Love"	Don Schlitz	
1989	Randy Travis	An Old Time Christmas	"How Do I Wrap My Heart Up for Christmas"	Randy Travis	
1989	Ronnie Milsap	Stranger Things Have Happened	"Houston Solution"	Don Schlitz	4
1989	Tanya Tucker	Greatest Hits	"My Arms Stay Open All Night"	Don Schlitz	2
1990	The Judds	Love Can Build a Bridge	"Love Can Build a Bridge"	John Barlow Jarvis, Naomi Judd	5
1991	George Jones	Friends in High Places	"If I Could Bottle This Up" (with Shelby Lynne)	Dean Dillon	43
1991	Keith Whitley	Kentucky Bluebird	"Somebody's Doin' Me Right"	Dan Tyler, J. Fred Knobloch	15
1991	Pam Tillis	Put Yourself in My Place	"One of Those Things"	Pam Tillis	6
1991	Paul Overstreet	Heroes	"Ball and Chain"	Don Schlitz	5
1991	Paul Overstreet	Heroes	"If I Could Bottle This Up"	Dean Dillon	30
1991	Paul Overstreet	Heroes	"Daddy's Come Around"	Don Schlitz	1
1991	Paul Overstreet	Heroes	"Love Lives On"	Taylor Dunn	
1991	Paul Overstreet	Heroes	"Heroes"	Claire Cloninger	4
1991	Paul Overstreet	Heroes	"I'm So Glad I was Dreaming"	Don Schlitz	
1991	Paul Overstreet	Heroes	"Straight and Narrow"	Don Schlitz	
1991	Paul Overstreet	Heroes	"Billy Can't Read"	Jerry Michael	57
1991	Paul Overstreet	Heroes	"She Supports Her Man"		
1991	Paul Overstreet	Heroes	"Til the Mountains Disappear"	Don Schlitz	
1991	Paul Overstreet	Heroes	"The Calm at the Center of My Storm"	Don Schlitz	
1992	Paul Overstreet	Love Is Strong	"Take Another Run"	Don Schlitz	60
1992	Paul Overstreet	Love Is Strong	"Still Out There Swinging"		57
1992	Paul Overstreet	Love Is Strong	"Me and My Baby"	Paul Davis	22
1992	Paul Overstreet	Love Is Strong	"There But for the Grace of God Go I"	Taylor Dunn	
1992	Paul Overstreet	Love Is Strong	"Love Is Strong"	Archie Jordan	
1992	Paul Overstreet	Love Is Strong	"Head Over Heels"	Paul Davis	
1992	Paul Overstreet	Love Is Strong	"What's Going Without Saying"	Jeff Borders	
1992	Paul Overstreet	Love Is Strong	"Take Some Action"	Tom Campbell	
1992	Paul Overstreet	Love Is Strong	"Lord She Sure Is Good at Loving Me"	Randy Travis	
1992	Paul Overstreet	Love Is Strong	"Till the Answer Comes (Gotta Keep Praying)"	Fred Carpenter, Billy Prince	
1994	Alison Krauss & Union Station	Keith Whitley: A Tribute Album	"When You Say Nothing at All"	Don Schlitz	3
1999	Kenny Chesney	Everywhere We Go	"She Thinks My Tractor's Sexy"	Jim Collins	11
2003	Tracy Byrd	The Truth About Men	"The Truth About Men"	Rory Feek, Tim Johnson	13
2004	Blake Shelton	Blake Shelton's Barn & Grill	"Some Beach"	Rory Feek	1
2012	Kristen Kelly	Kristen Kelly	"Ex-Old Man"	Kristen Kelly	30
