= Paul Overstreet discography =

- Studio albums: 13
- Compilation albums: 1
- Singles: 18

American singer-songwriter Paul Overstreet has released thirteen studio albums and eighteen singles. Overstreet made his debut in 1982 with the single "Beautiful Baby" from an unsuccessful solo debut album for RCA Records Nashville. After this, he joined the trio S-K-O (Schuyler, Knobloch & Overstreet), which recorded for MTM Records and had a number-one single on the Billboard Hot Country Songs charts with "Baby's Got a New Baby".

After leaving S-K-O, Overstreet and Paul Davis were featured vocalists on Tanya Tucker's "I Won't Take Less Than Your Love", which was a number-one country single in 1988. Overstreet then re-signed with RCA for three albums—Sowin' Love, Heroes, and Love Is Strong— which accumulated 13 entries on the Billboard country charts. Among these was his only solo number one hit, "Daddy's Come Around", in 1990. Overstreet has not entered the Billboard charts since 1996, but he has continued to record on the Scarlet Moon label.

== Albums ==
=== Studio albums ===
Title	Album details	Peak positions		
Title	Album details	US Country	US	US Christ
Paul Overstreet	Release year: 1982; Label: RCA	—	—	—
Sowin' Love	Release year: 1989; Label: RCA	13	—	31
Heroes	Release year: 1991; Label: RCA	17	163	21
Love Is Strong	Release: August 11, 1992; Label: RCA	60	—	28
Time	Release year: 1996; Label: Scarlet Moon	—	—	37
A Songwriter's Project, Volume 1	Release year: 1999; Label: Scarlet Moon	—	—	—
Living by the Book	Release year: 2001; Label: Scarlet Moon	—	—	—
Christmas: My Favorite Time of the Year	Release year: 2001; Label: Scarlet Moon	—	—	—
Forever and Ever, Amen	Release year: 2002; Label: Scarlet Moon	—	—	—
Something for the Road	Release year: 2006; Label: Scarlet Moon	—	—	—
My Favorite Demos Volume I	Release year: 2010; Label: Scarlet Moon	—	—	—
My Favorite Demos Volume II	Release year: 2010; Label: Scarlet Moon	—	—	—
Somewhere in the Caribbean	Release year: 2018; Label: Lucky Pony	—	—	—
"—" denotes releases that did not chart

=== Compilation albums ===
Title	Album details	Peak positions
Title	Album details	US Christ
The Best of Paul Overstreet	Release year: 1994; Label: RCA	16

== Singles ==
Year	Single	Peak positions		Album
Year	Single	US Country	CAN Country	Album
1982	"Beautiful Baby"	76	—	Paul Overstreet
1988	"Love Helps Those"	3	9	Sowin' Love
1989	"Sowin' Love"	9	41	Sowin' Love
1989	"All the Fun"	5	10	Sowin' Love
1990	"Seein' My Father in Me"	2	2	Sowin' Love
1990	"Richest Man on Earth"	3	4	Sowin' Love
1990	"Daddy's Come Around"	1	2	Heroes
1991	"Heroes"	4	6	Heroes
1991	"Ball and Chain"	5	5	Heroes
1991	"If I Could Bottle This Up"	30	33	Heroes
1992	"Billy Can't Read"	57	51	Heroes
1992	"Me and My Baby"	22	27	Love Is Strong
1992	"Still Out There Swinging"	57	84	Love Is Strong
1993	"Take Another Run"	60	—	Love Is Strong
1996	"We've Got to Keep On Meeting Like This"	73	—	Time
1996	"Even When It Don't Feel Like It"	—	—	Time
2000	"When Mamma Ain't Happy"	—	—	A Songwriter's Project, Volume 1
2008	"I Think She Only Loves Me for My Willie"	—	—	Something for the Road
"—" denotes releases that did not chart

=== Featured singles ===
Year	Single	Peak positions		Album
Year	Single	US Country	CAN Country	Album
1987	"I Won't Take Less Than Your Love" (Tanya Tucker with Paul Davis and Paul Overstreet)	1	10	Love Me Like You Used To
1993	"I Don't Love You Like I Used To" (Susie Luchsinger with Paul Overstreet)	—	—	Real Love
"—" denotes releases that did not chart

== Music videos ==
Year	Video	Director
1989	"All the Fun"	Jim May
1990	"Seein' My Father in Me"	Jack Cole
1991	"Heroes"	Deaton Flanigen
1992	"Billy Can't Read"	Steven Goldmann
1993	"Take Another Run"	Jeff Smith
1994	"I Don't Love You Like I Used To" (Susie Luchsinger with Paul Overstreet)	
1996	"We've Got to Keep On Meeting Like This"	
1996	"Even When It Don't Feel Like It"	
2000	"When Mamma Ain't Happy"	
2015	"Somewhere in the Caribbean"	

== See also ==
- S-K-O#Discography
