= Greatest Hits (1989 Tanya Tucker album) =

Greatest hits album by Tanya Tucker
- Released: July 25, 1989
- Genre: Country
- Length: 35:00
- Label: Capitol
- Producer: Jerry Crutchfield

Tanya Tucker chronology
Strong Enough to Bend (1988)	Greatest Hits (1989)	Tennessee Woman (1990)

Singles from Greatest Hits
- 1. "My Arms Stay Open All Night" Released: October 17, 1989

Professional ratings
Review scores
Source	Rating
Allmusic	4/5 stars

Greatest Hits is a compilation album by American country music artist Tanya Tucker. It was released by Capitol Records in July 1989, containing the new song, "My Arms Stay Open All Night," and most of the singles from the albums Girls Like Me, Love Me Like You Used To and Strong Enough to Bend (although the Top 10 singles "Highway Robbery" and "Call On Me" were omitted). The album peaked at number 20 on the Billboard Top Country Albums chart and was certified Gold by the RIAA.

== Track listing ==
No.	Title	Writer(s)	Length
1.	"Daddy and Home"	Elsie McWilliams, Jimmie Rodgers	2:47
2.	"Strong Enough to Bend"	Beth Nielsen Chapman, Don Schlitz	2:43
3.	"Love Me Like You Used To"	Paul Davis, Bobby Emmons	3:48
4.	"Just Another Love"	Davis	3:12
5.	"I'll Come Back as Another Woman"	Kent Robbins, Richard E. Carpenter	4:03
6.	"My Arms Stay Open All Night"	Paul Overstreet, Schlitz	3:37
7.	"If It Don't Come Easy"	Dave Gibson, Craig Karp	3:28
8.	"I Won't Take Less Than Your Love" (with Paul Davis and Paul Overstreet)	Overstreet, Schlitz	3:40
9.	"One Love at a Time"	Davis, Overstreet	2:54
10.	"It's Only Over for You"	Mike Reid, Rory Bourke	3:04

== Charts ==
=== Weekly charts ===
Chart (1989)	Peak position
US Top Country Albums (Billboard)	20

=== Year-end charts ===
Chart (1990)	Position
US Top Country Albums (Billboard)	72
