= The Best of Paul Overstreet =

Greatest hits album by Paul Overstreet
- Released: February 15, 1994
- Genre: Country
- Length: 37:19
- Label: RCA
- Producer: James Stroud, Brown Bannister, Paul Overstreet

Paul Overstreet chronology
Love Is Strong (1992)	The Best of Paul Overstreet (1994)	Time (1996)

The Best of Paul Overstreet is the first compilation album by the American country music artist of the same name. It released on February 15, 1994, via RCA Records.

== Track listing ==
No.	Title	Writer(s)	Length
1.	"Sowin' Love"	Paul Overstreet, Don Schlitz	3:48
2.	"All the Fun"	Overstreet, Taylor Dunn	4:03
3.	"Seein' My Father in Me"	Overstreet, Dunn	3:23
4.	"Richest Man on Earth"	Overstreet, Schlitz	3:08
5.	"Daddy's Come Around"	Overstreet, Schlitz	3:31
6.	"Heroes"	Overstreet, Claire Cloninger	4:32
7.	"Ball and Chain"	Overstreet, Schlitz	3:30
8.	"If I Could Bottle This Up"	Overstreet, Dean Dillon	3:49
9.	"Billy Can't Read"	Overstreet, Jerry Michael	3:44
10.	"Take Another Run"	Overstreet, Schlitz	3:51

== Chart performance ==
Chart (1994)	Peak position
US Christian Albums (Billboard)	16
