= Should I Do It =

Should I Do It may refer to:

- "Should I Do It" (song), by the Pointer Sisters
- Should I Do It (album), a 1981 album by Tanya Tucker
