= Live (Tanya Tucker album) =

Live album by Tanya Tucker
- Released: March 1, 1982
- Recorded: Fall 1981
- Venue: John Ascuaga's Nugget Hotel Casino Resort (Reno)
- Genre: Country
- Length: 29:28
- Label: MCA
- Producer: Snuff Garrett

Tanya Tucker chronology
Should I Do It (1981)	Live (1982)	Changes (1982)

Singles from Live
- 1. "Somebody Buy This Cowgirl a Beer" Released: February 22, 1982

Live is the first live album by American country music singer Tanya Tucker. It was released on March 1, 1982 as her final album for MCA Records before signing with Arista Records. The album was recorded in the fall of 1981 at John Ascuaga's Nugget Hotel Casino Resort in Reno, Nevada, and produced by Snuff Garrett.

== Content ==
Tucker primarily performs songs that she had recorded and released on her previous studio albums. Three of the songs, however, had not appeared on any of her prior albums: "Somebody Buy This Cowgirl a Beer", "Pecos Promenade", and Robbie Robertson's "The Night They Drove Old Dixie Down", which was made famous earlier by Joan Baez. However, a studio version of "Pecos Promenade" had been featured on the Smokey and the Bandit II soundtrack album.

== Critical reception ==
The review published in the March 13, 1982 issue of Billboard said, "This package is composed primarily of Tucker's top ten hits. The live production effectively captures her raw, gutsy vocals. There's also a cover of "The Night They Drove Old Dixie Down"."

Cashbox also gave a review of the album, which said, "Raw energy and a rough and gravelly voice are Tucker’s trademarks, and nowhere better can these characteristics shine through than in a live concert. Here she is captured in concert at the Nugget, performing songs like her first hit, "Delta Dawn", up through the most recent, "Can I See You Tonight", and the current single, "Somebody Buy This Cowgirl a Beer". The package features 11 songs, including the cowboy anthem, "Texas (When I Die)"."

== Track listing ==
Side one
No.	Title	Writer(s)	Length
1.	"Opening—Halfway to Heaven"	Jerry Goldstein; Robert E. Getter; Guy F. Peritore	2:54
2.	"Medley: What's Your Mama's Name / Blood Red and Goin' Down / Would You Lay With Me (In a Field of Stone)"	Earl Montgomery; Dallas Frazier; Curly Putman; David Allan Coe	6:50
3.	"The Jamestown Ferry"	Mack Vickery; Bobby Borchers	2:27
4.	"Somebody Buy This Cowgirl a Beer"	Milton Brown; Stephen Dorff; Snuff Garrett	2:12

Side two
No.	Title	Writer(s)	Length
1.	"Can I See You Tonight"	Rafe Van Hoy; Deborah Allen	2:31
2.	"Pecos Promenade"	Larry Collins; Sandy Pinkard; Garrett	2:23
3.	"The Night They Drove Old Dixie Down"	J. Robbie Robertson	3:30
4.	"Delta Dawn"	Alex Harvey; Collins	3:25
5.	"Texas (When I Die)"	Ed Bruce; Bobby Borchers; Patsy Bruce	3:16

== Personnel ==
Adapted from the album liner notes.

- Mark Eshelman – recording
- Snuff Garrett – producer
- Dave Pell – photography
- Gary Singleman – recording
- Scott Stogel – recording
- Greg Venable – engineer

== Charts ==
Chart (2019)	Peak position
US Top Country Albums (Billboard)	67
