= Daddy and Home =

"Daddy and Home" is a song originally recorded by American country singer-songwriter, Jimmie Rodgers. It was composed by Rodgers, along with Elsie McWilliams. Rodgers first cut the song himself in 1929 and had since been recorded by a series of artists since its original composition. It was notably covered by Tanya Tucker, who released it as a single in 1989. It was also included on her studio album titled, Strong Enough to Bend

== Jimmie Rodgers original recording ==
"Daddy and Home" told the story of an adult who longs to spend time with his father and return home. The song followed a tradition of songs that paid tribute to fathers such as Gene Autry's "That Silver Haired Daddy of Mine". Rodgers's version was released as a single by the Victor Talking Machine Company in 1929.

== Tanya Tucker version ==
"Daddy and Home"

Single by Tanya Tucker

from the album Strong Enough to Bend
- B-side: "Playing for Keeps"
- Released: July 1989
- Recorded: December 1987
- Studio: Compass Studio Point
- Genre: Country
- Length: 2:46
- Label: Capitol
- Songwriter(s): Elsie McWilliams; Jimmie Rodgers
- Producer(s): Jerry Crutchfield

Tanya Tucker singles chronology
"Call on Me" (1989)	"Daddy and Home" (1989)	"My Arms Stay Open All Night" (1989)

Tanya Tucker notably recorded "Daddy and Home". Tucker had first reached commercial success as a teenager with the 1972 top ten song, "Delta Dawn". A series of number one and top ten singles followed through the seventies. However, as Tucker's personal life began to crumble her music career also was affected. She had limited success until signing a new contract with Capitol Records in 1986. She returned that year with the single "One Love at a Time" and she had a string of number one and top ten singles again through the eighties.

Among her singles on Capitol in the eighties was a cover of Jimmie Rodgers's "Daddy and Home". Tucker had originally recorded her version of the track in December 1987 at the Compass Point, a studio located in The Bahamas. It was produced by Jerry Crutchfield.

"Daddy and Home" first appeared as an album track on Tucker's 1988 studio album, Strong Enough to Bend. In July 1989, it was spawned as the album's fourth and final single. It spent a total of 15 weeks on the American Billboard Hot Country Songs, climbing to the number 27 position by September 1989. The track was Tucker's first single since 1983 to miss the top ten. It reached a similar position on the Canadian RPM Country chart, peaking at number 25.

=== Track listing ===
7" vinyl single

- "Daddy and Home" – 2:46
- "Playing for Keeps" – 3:35

=== Chart performance ===
Chart (1989)	Peak position
Canada Country Singles (RPM)	25
US Hot Country Songs (Billboard)	27
