= Strong Enough to Bend =

Studio album by Tanya Tucker
- Released: August 8, 1988
- Genre: Country
- Length: 33:55
- Label: Capitol
- Producer: Jerry Crutchfield

Tanya Tucker chronology
Love Me Like You Used To (1987)	Strong Enough to Bend (1988)	Greatest Hits (1989)

Singles from Strong Enough to Bend
- 1. "Strong Enough to Bend" Released: July 4, 1988; 2. "Highway Robbery" Released: November 14, 1988; 3. "Call on Me" Released: March 13, 1989; 4. "Daddy and Home" Released: July 10, 1989

Professional ratings
Review scores
Source	Rating
AllMusic	3/5 stars
Chicago Tribune	(favorable)
The Rolling Stone Album Guide	2/5 stars

Strong Enough to Bend is the 17th studio album by American country music artist Tanya Tucker, released in 1988. The album contains three singles that made the Billboard Top Ten Country singles charts: "Strong Enough to Bend" at number one, "Highway Robbery" at number two, and "Call on Me" at number four. The single "Daddy and Home" rose to number 27, while the album itself peaked at number nine on the country albums chart.

== Track listing ==
No.	Title	Writer(s)	Length
1.	"You're Not Alone"	Tom Shapiro, Chris Waters	3:05
2.	"Strong Enough to Bend"	Beth Nielsen Chapman, Don Schlitz	2:43
3.	"As Long as I'm Dreamin'"	Jeff Cook, Teddy Gentry, John Jarrard, Gary Nicholson	3:35
4.	"Lonesome Town"	Matraca Berg, Ronnie Samoset	4:11
5.	"Daddy and Home"	Jimmie Rodgers, Elsie McWilliams	2:49
6.	"Highway Robbery"	Michael Garvin, Bucky Jones, Shapiro	3:29
7.	"Lonely at the Right Time"	Frank J. Myers, Don Pfrimmer	3:54
8.	"Playing for Keeps"	Lewis Anderson, Lisa Silver	3:36
9.	"Call on Me"	Gary Scruggs	3:22
10.	"Back on My Feet"	Max D. Barnes, Troy Seals	3:24

== Production ==
- Produced By Jerry Crutchfield
- Engineered By Scott Hendricks

== Personnel ==
- Tanya Tucker - lead vocals
- James Stroud - drums, percussion
- Bob Wray - bass guitar
- Mitch Humphries, Dave Innis - keyboards, synthesizer
- Steve Gibson, Kenny Mims, Don Potter - guitar
- Paul Franklin - steel guitar
- Mark O'Connor - fiddle
- Paul Franklin, Steve Gibson - dobro
- Steve Gibson - mandolin
- Jim Horn - saxophone
- Michael Black, Jessica Boucher, Beth Nielsen Chapman, Carol Chase, Greg Gordon, Katerina Kitridge, Diane Vanette, Hurshel Wiginton, Dennis Wilson, Curtis Young - background vocals

== Chart performance ==
Chart (1988)	Peak position
U.S. Billboard Top Country Albums	9
Canadian RPM Country Albums	25
