= Elsie McWilliams =

American songwriter (1896–1985)

- Born: Elsie Williamson; June 1, 1896; Harperville, Mississippi
- Died: December 30, 1985 (aged 89)
- Occupation: songwriter
- Known for: Jimmie Rodgers
- Notable work: Blue Yodel

Elsie McWilliams (nee Williamson, June 1, 1896 – December 30, 1985) was a songwriter who wrote for Jimmie Rodgers. McWilliams, even though she is only officially credited with writing twenty songs, actually wrote or co-wrote 39 songs for Rodgers. McWilliams was his most frequent collaborator. She was the first woman to make a career as a country music songwriter.

== Biography ==
McWilliams was born in Harperville, Mississippi into a musical and religious family. She graduated from high school in 1917 in Meridian and afterwards, taught school until she married.

Her sister, Carrie, married Jimmie Rogers and in 1920, she and Rogers formed a dance band. McWilliams played piano and sang in the band.

Rodgers asked McWilliams to help him with songwriting after he secured a recording contract and McWilliams agreed, traveling to recording sessions and collaborating. Rodgers could not read music, so McWilliams would play the songs and he would learn them by ear. The first song she wrote for Rodgers was A Sailor's Plea. Many of her songs became top hits. McWilliams's ideas for her songs often "came from conversation" and she said that "When an idea hit me, I would have to write it down that minute or it would get away."

Part of the reason he needed help was because his health was poor. Even though McWilliams helped him write songs, she only took credit for some, stating that she wanted the full amount of the money to go to Rodgers and his family. Sometimes when she received payment for her work, she would turn the royalties back over to Rodgers.

After Rodger's death in 1933, McWilliams focused more on her family and her church. In 1938, she and her sister made recordings in memory of Rodgers. In 1979, she was inducted into the Nashville Songwriters Hall of Fame. In 2010, a marker on the Mississippi Country Music Trail was created to honor her work.

== Works ==
- Blue Yodel No. 7
- Cowhand's Last Ride,
- Daddy and Home
- Everybody Does It In My Hawaii,
- Hobo Bill's Last Ride,
- Home Call,
- Lonesome Blues,
- Lullaby Yodel,
- My Little Home in New Orleans
- My Little Lady,
- My Old Pal,
- My Rough and Rowdy Ways,
- The Never No Mo Blues,
- Nobody Knows But Me,
- A Sailor's Plea,
- That's Why I'm Blue
- Tuck Away My Lonesome Blues
- Waitin' For the Train,
- Yodeling Cowboy,
- You and My Old Guitar,
