= Time (Paul Overstreet album) =

Studio album by Paul Overstreet
- Released: February 27, 1996
- Studio: Nightingale Studios, Nashville, Tennessee
- Genre: Country
- Length: 34:37
- Label: Scarlet Moon
- Producer: Jerry Crutchfield

Paul Overstreet chronology
The Best of Paul Overstreet (1994)	Time (1996)	A Songwriter's Project Vol. 1 (1999)

Time is the fifth studio album by Paul Overstreet. It was released February 27, 1996. The album peaked at No. 37 on the Billboard 200 chart. The song "We've Got to Keep on Meeting Like This" charted at No. 73 on the Hot Country Songs chart.

== Critical reception ==
Professional ratings
Review scores
Source	Rating
AllMusic	3/5 stars

Mark Brinkman of Country Standard Time begins his review of Time with, "Smooth, straight-ahead, positive, and feel-good are all thoughts that come to mind as one listens to Paul Overstreet's latest."

The review at Christian Library by Wes L. Bredenhof states, "Paul Overstreet's latest album continues his tradition of playing country music with strong Christian themes." He concludes with, "Unlike his previous releases, Time will probably not be available in mainstream record stores, since it has been released by a small independent company."

== Track listing ==
No.	Title	Writer(s)	Length
1.	"We've Got to Keep on Meeting Like This"	Paul Overstreet; Archie Jordan	3:02
2.	"I'm Gonna Ring Her"	Overstreet; Randy Travis	3:13
3.	"Even When It Don't Feel Like It"	Overstreet	3:57
4.	"Let's Go to Bed Early"	Overstreet; Sean McCarthy; Taylor Dunn	3:28
5.	"You Gave Me Time"	Overstreet; Bob DiPiero	3:49
6.	"I Always Will"	Overstreet; Jordan	2:31
7.	"One in a Million"	Overstreet; Tom Campbell	3:36
8.	"Blackberry Cobbler"	Overstreet	3:27
9.	"Mr. Miller"	Overstreet	3:27
10.	"My Rock"	Claude Hensley; Don Bryant	4:07
Total length:			34:37

== Musicians ==
- Paul Overstreet – vocals, background vocals
- Eddie Bayers – drums
- Mark Casstevens – acoustic guitar
- Dan Dugmore – steel guitar
- Sonny Garrish – steel guitar
- Greg Gordon – background vocals
- David Hungate – bass
- Paul Leim – drums
- Brent Mason – electric guitar
- Terry McMillan – harmonica
- Steve Nathan – piano
- Louis Dean Nunley – background vocals
- Don Potter – acoustic guitar
- Gary Prim – piano
- Matt Rollings – piano
- Brent Rowan – electric guitar
- Hank Singer – fiddle
- Neil Thrasher – background vocals
- Bob Wray – bass
- Reggie Young – electric guitar

Production

- Joe Bogan – engineer
- Jerry Crutchfield – producer
- Don Moen – executive producer
- Jonathan Russell – mastering
- Denny Purcell – mastering
- John Guess – mixing
- Christopher Bogan – assistant engineer
- Joe Hayden – assistant engineer
- Craig White – engineer
- Cari Landers – production coordination
- Ben Pearson – photography
- Buddy Jackson – art direction
- Christie Knubel – design
- Robert Charles – assistant engineer
- Don Cobb – digital editing
- T. Michael Coleman – executive producer

Track information and credits adapted from AllMusic.

== Charts ==
=== Album ===
Chart (2003)	Peak position
Billboard 200	37

=== Singles ===
Title	Date	Chart	Peak position
"We've Got to Keep On Meeting Like This"	January 19, 1996	US Hot Country Songs (Billboard)	73
