= Friends in High Places (George Jones album) =

Studio album by George Jones
- Released: March 12, 1991
- Genre: Country
- Length: 27:52
- Label: Epic
- Producer: Billy Sherrill

George Jones chronology
You Oughta Be Here with Me (1990)	Friends in High Places (1991)	And Along Came Jones (1991)

Singles from Friends in High Places
- 1. "If I Could Bottle This Up" Released: September 3, 1988; 2. "All Fall Down" Released: February 1991

Friends in High Places is an album of duets by the American country music artist George Jones, released in 1991. It was Jones's final studio album for Epic Records.

The album peaked at No. 72 on Billboard's Top Country Albums chart. "A Few Ole Country Boys", a duet with Randy Travis, was a country music hit.

== Production ==
The album was produced by Billy Sherrill. Its title was inspired by the hit single by Garth Brooks, "Friends in Low Places".

== Critical reception ==
Professional ratings
Review scores
Source	Rating
AllMusic	3/5 stars
Calgary Herald	D

The Calgary Herald noted that Jones "simply overwhelms bland singers, like Ricky Van Shelton, or forces them to become shrill, like Shelby Lynne." The Dallas Morning News wrote that most of the tracks "are overproduced throwaways in which the singers' interplay is so perfunctory that George might as well be faxing in his harmonies."

== Track listing ==
No.	Title	Writer(s)	Duet partner	Length
1.	"A Few Ole Country Boys"	Troy Seals, Mentor Williams	Randy Travis	3:37
2.	"All Fall Down"	Harlan Howard, Ron Peterson	Emmylou Harris	3:18
3.	"Fiddle and Guitar Band"	Charlie Daniels	Charlie Daniels	2:25
4.	"All That We've Got Left"	Buddy Cannon, Vern Gosdin, Russell Smith	Vern Gosdin	2:57
5.	"Love's Gonna Live Here"	Buck Owens	Buck Owens	1:58
6.	"If I Could Bottle This Up"	Dean Dillon, Paul Overstreet	Shelby Lynne	3:11
7.	"I've Been There"	Tim Mensy	Tim Mensy	2:22
8.	"You Can't Do Wrong and Get By"	Larry Cordle, Jim Rushing	Ricky Skaggs	2:41
9.	"It Hurts as Much in Texas (As It Did in Tennessee)"	Dennis Knutson, A. L. Owens	Ricky Van Shelton	2:22
10.	"Traveller's Prayer"	Gretchen Peters	Sweethearts of the Rodeo	3:01
