= Black & White (Pointer Sisters album) =

Studio album by Pointer Sisters
- Released: June 12, 1981
- Studio: Studio 55 (Los Angeles, California) Celebration (New York City, New York)
- Genre: R&B, pop, soul
- Length: 37:39 (LP release); 37:06 (CD release); 44:27 (Expanded release)
- Label: Planet
- Producer: Richard Perry

Pointer Sisters chronology
Special Things (1980)	Black & White (1981)	So Excited! (1982)

Singles from Black & White
- 1. "Slow Hand" Released: May 1981; 2. "What a Surprise!" Released: 1981; 3. "Sweet Lover Man" Released: 1981; 4. "Should I Do It" Released: December 1981

Black & White is the eighth studio album by the Pointer Sisters, released in 1981 on the Planet label.

== History ==
Black & White was their fourth record with producer Richard Perry and yielded the No. 2 pop hit "Slow Hand". The fourth single release, "Should I Do It", reached No. 13 in the spring of 1982, making Black & White the first Pointer Sisters album to yield two Top Twenty hits. Black & White was certified Gold in September 1981. The album was remastered and issued on CD with bonus tracks in 2009 by Wounded Bird Records.

== Critical reception ==
Professional ratings
Review scores
Source	Rating
AllMusic	4/5 stars
The Rolling Stone Album Guide	3.5/5 stars

Record World said that the second single "What a Surprise" has "sing-song choruses and a simple yet effective melody line."

== Track listing ==
Side one
No.	Title	Writer(s)	Length
1.	"Sweet Lover Man"	Jerry Ragovoy, Len Roberts	4:12
2.	"Someday We'll Be Together"	Russ Ballard	4:39
3.	"Take My Heart, Take My Soul"	Ken Gold, Mickey Denne	4:06
4.	"Slow Hand"	Michael Clark, John Bettis	3:54
5.	"We're Gonna Make It"	David Foster, Mike Cotton, Anita Pointer, June Pointer	3:56

Side two
No.	Title	Writer(s)	Length
6.	"What a Surprise"	A. Pointer, J. Pointer, Trevor Lawrence	3:50
7.	"Got to Find Love"	David Lasley, Willie Wilcox	4:04
8.	"Fall in Love Again"	Patrick Henderson, Wornell Jones	4:30
9.	"Should I Do It"	Layng Martine, Jr.	3:53

2009 remastered bonus tracks
No.	Title	Writer(s)	Length
10.	"Holdin' Out for Love"	Cynthia Weil, Tom Snow	3:22
11.	"What a Surprise" (Original Edit)		4:11

== Personnel ==
The Pointer Sisters

- Anita Pointer – lead vocals (2, 4–6), backing vocals, vocal arrangements
- June Pointer – lead vocals (1, 5, 7–9), backing vocals, vocal arrangements
- Ruth Pointer – lead vocals (3), backing vocals, vocal arrangements

Musicians

- James Newton Howard – keyboards (1), synthesizers (1, 3, 8)
- John Barnes – keyboards (2, 3, 6–8), electric piano (4), acoustic piano (9)
- Ed Walsh – synthesizers (2, 6, 7)
- William Smith – organ (4)
- Mike Cotten – synthesizers (5), synthesizer programming (5)
- David Foster – keyboards (5), arrangements (5)
- Greg Phillinganes – electric piano (9)
- Danny Faragher – organ (9)
- Paul Jackson Jr. – guitars (1–4, 6–9), guitar solo (8)
- Tim May – guitars (1–4, 6–9)
- Nathan Watts – bass (1–4, 6–9)
- Mike Porcaro – bass (5)
- John Robinson – drums
- Paulinho da Costa – percussion (1–4, 6–9), congas (5)
- Trevor Lawrence – tenor sax solo (3, 6, 9)

Production

- Richard Perry – producer
- Trevor Lawrence – associate producer
- David Foster – production assistance (track 5)
- Gabe Veltri – recording
- Piers Plaskitt – additional recording
- Bill Schnee – remixing
- Tim Dennen – assistant engineer
- Stuart Furusho – assistant engineer
- Bobby Gerber – assistant engineer
- Larry Emerine – mastering
- Stephen Marcussen – mastering
- Precision Lacquer (Hollywood, California) – mastering location
- Michael Barackman – music coordinator
- Susan Epstein – production coordinator
- Michael Solomon – production coordinator
- Kosh – art direction and design
- Aaron Rapoport – photography

== Charts ==
Weekly chart performance for Black & White
Chart (1981)	Peak position
Australian Albums (Kent Music Report)	15
Dutch Albums (Album Top 100)	39
New Zealand Albums (RMNZ)	10
UK Albums (OCC)	21
US Billboard 200	13
US Top R&B/Hip-Hop Albums (Billboard)	9
