= Lonely Heart (Tammy Wynette song) =

Single by Tammy Wynette
- B-side: "(I'm Not) a Candle in the Wind"
- Released: April 1984
- Genre: Country
- Length: 2:51
- Label: Epic
- Songwriter(s): Paul Overstreet
- Producer(s): Jerry Crutchfield

Tammy Wynette singles chronology
"Still in the Ring" (1983)	"Lonely Heart" (1984)	"Sometimes When We Touch" (1985)

"Lonely Heart" is a song written by Paul Overstreet that was originally recorded by American country artist Tammy Wynette. It was released as a single in 1984, reaching a charting position on the American country music chart the same year.

== Background, release and chart performance ==
Tammy Wynette was considered among country music's most popular female artists during the 1960s and 1970s. She had 20 number one Billboard country singles. Her popularity on the country chart began waning in the early 1980s. Several singles began reaching progressively lower positions following 1981. One of the singles Wynette recorded in the early 1980s was "Lonely Heart". The song was composed by Paul Overstreet.

The song was produced by Jerry Crutchfield. It was released as a single by Epic Records in April 1984 backed by the track, "(I'm Not) a Candle in the Wind". "Lonely Heart" peaked at number 40 on the American Billboard Hot Country Songs chart in 1984. It was Wynette's first solo top 40 chart entry in one year.

== Track listing ==
7" vinyl single

- "Lonely Heart" – 2:54
- "(I'm Not) a Candle in the Wind" – 3:29

== Charts ==
Chart (1984)	Peak position
US Hot Country Singles (Billboard)	40
