= Rainbow (Johnny Cash album) =

Studio album by Johnny Cash
- Released: October 28, 1985
- Studios: Woodland (Nashville, Tennessee); Moman's Recording (Nashville, Tennessee)
- Genre: Country
- Length: 28:40
- Label: Columbia
- Producer: Chips Moman

Johnny Cash chronology
| Highwayman (1985) | Rainbow (1985) | Heroes (1986) |

Singles from Rainbow
- 1. "I'm Leaving Now" Released: 1985

Rainbow is the 70th overall album by American country singer Johnny Cash, his last for Columbia Records, released in 1985 (see 1985 in country music). "I'm Leaving Now", which was re-recorded 15 years later for Cash's American III: Solitary Man, was released as a single rather unsuccessfully, but the album's signature song is a cover of Kris Kristofferson's "Here Comes That Rainbow Again", which also appeared on Cash's 1995 collaboration with Kristofferson, Willie Nelson and Waylon Jennings - known as The Highwaymen - entitled The Road Goes on Forever, though it was sung solo by Kristofferson on the latter. Also included is a cover of Creedence Clearwater Revival's "Have You Ever Seen the Rain," from Pendulum. The album also includes the song "Love Me Like You Used To," which was later recorded by fellow country singer Tanya Tucker, and became a country hit for her. Following the release of this album and a duet album with Jennings in 1986, Cash moved to Mercury Records as a result of Columbia's fading interest in his music, though he later returned to Columbia for the second Highwaymen album.

== Track listing ==
| No. | Title | Writer(s) | Length |
|---|---|---|---|
| 1. | "I'm Leaving Now" | Johnny Cash | 2:17 |
| 2. | "Here Comes That Rainbow Again" | Kris Kristofferson | 2:50 |
| 3. | "They're All the Same" | Willie Nelson | 3:09 |
| 4. | "Easy Street" | Bobby Emmons, Chips Moman | 2:46 |
| 5. | "Have You Ever Seen the Rain?" | John Fogerty | 2:30 |
| 6. | "You Beat All I Ever Saw" (backing vocals by Waylon Jennings) | Johnny Cash | 2:56 |
| 7. | "Unwed Fathers" | Bobby Braddock, John Prine | 3:13 |
| 8. | "Love Me Like You Used To" | Paul Davis, Bobby Emmons | 2:42 |
| 9. | "Casey's Last Ride" | Kris Kristofferson | 3:18 |
| 10. | "Borderline (A Musical Whodunit)" | Bobby Emmons, Chips Moman | 2:59 |

== Personnel ==
- Johnny Cash - vocals, guitar, backing vocals
- Gene Chrisman, Jerry Carrigan - drums
- Mike Leech, Jimmy Tittle - bass
- Chips Moman, Reggie Young, James B. Cobb Jr., Jerry Shook, Barry Bailey - guitar
- Bobby Emmons, Bobby Wood, Paul Davis - keyboards
- Wayne Jackson, Jack Hale - horns
- Marty Stuart - mandolin, guitar
- Johnny Cash, June Carter Cash, Waylon Jennings, Paul Davis, Toni Wine, Chips Moman, Marty Stuart, Bobby Wood, James B. Cobb Jr. - backing vocals

Production and technical staff

- Produced by: Chips Moman
- Engineers: David Cherry and Chips Moman
- Assistant Engineer: Ken Criblez at Woodland Sound Studios, Nashville, Tn
- Recorded at Moman's Recordings Studio, Nashville, Tn, and Woodland Sound Studios, Nashville, Tn
- Mixed at Moman's Studio
- Mastered by: Denny Purcell at Woodland Sound Studios, Nashville, Tn
- Photography: Ron Keith, Scott Bonner
- Design: Jeff Morris
- Art Director: Virginia Team
