= My Arms Stay Open All Night =

Single by Tanya Tucker

from the album Greatest Hits
- B-side: "Love Me Like You Used To"
- Released: October 28, 1989
- Genre: Country
- Length: 3:37
- Label: Capitol Nashville
- Songwriters: Paul Overstreet, Don Schlitz
- Producer: Jerry Crutchfield

Tanya Tucker singles chronology
"Daddy and Home" (1989)	"My Arms Stay Open All Night" (1989)	"Walking Shoes" (1990)

"My Arms Stay Open All Night" is a song written by Paul Overstreet and Don Schlitz, and recorded by American country music artist Tanya Tucker. It was released in October 1989 as the only single from her 1989 Greatest Hits compilation album. The song reached #2 on the Billboard Hot Country Singles & Tracks chart.

== Chart performance ==
Chart (1989–1990)	Peak position
Canada Country Singles (RPM)	2
US Hot Country Songs (Billboard)	2

=== Year-end charts ===
Chart (1990)	Position
Canada Country Tracks (RPM)	30
US Country Songs (Billboard)	17
