= Heroes (Paul Overstreet album) =

Studio album by Paul Overstreet
- Released: January 19, 1991
- Recorded: 1990
- Genre: Country
- Length: 39:31
- Label: RCA Nashville
- Producer: Brown Bannister; Paul Overstreet

Paul Overstreet chronology
Sowin' Love (1989)	Heroes (1991)	Love Is Strong (1992)

Singles from Heroes
- 1. "Daddy's Come Around" Released: November 1990; 2. "Heroes" Released: February 1991; 3. "Ball and Chain" Released: June 24, 1991; 4. "If I Could Bottle This Up" Released: November 23, 1991; 5. "Billy Can't Read" Released: March 1992

Professional ratings
Review scores
Source	Rating
Allmusic	3/5 stars

Heroes is the third studio album by American country music artist Paul Overstreet. The album was released by RCA Nashville in 1991. The album reached #17 on Billboard's Top Country Albums chart and charted at #21 on the Top Christian Albums chart. This album produced three top ten singles including Overstreet's first and only number 1 song, "Daddy's Come Around". Other singles and their peaks on the chart were "Heroes" (#4), "Ball and Chain" (#5), "If I Could Bottle This Up" (#30), and "Billy Can't Read" (#57).

== Content ==
Paul Overstreet wrote or co-wrote every track on the album, most of them with Don Schlitz. Fellow country artists Pam Tillis and Trisha Yearwood sing background vocals as well as Christian Music singer Chris Rodriguez. On the LP release of the album, the songs "I'm So Glad I was Dreaming" and "Straight and Narrow" were not included, leaving the album with nine tracks.

== Track listing ==
No.	Title	Writer(s)	Length
1.	"Ball and Chain"	Paul Overstreet, Don Schlitz	3:38
2.	"If I Could Bottle This Up"	Overstreet, Dean Dillon	3:49
3.	"Daddy's Come Around"	Overstreet, Schlitz	3:33
4.	"Love Lives On"	Overstreet, Taylor Dunn	3:08
5.	"Heroes"	Overstreet, Claire Cloninger	4:28
6.	"I'm So Glad I Was Dreaming"	Overstreet, Schlitz	3:45
7.	"Straight and Narrow"	Overstreet, Schlitz	3:21
8.	"Billy Can't Read"	Overstreet, Jerry Michael	3:49
9.	"She Supports Her Man"	Overstreet	4:01
10.	"'Til the Mountains Disappear"	Overstreet, Schlitz	2:37
11.	"The Calm at the Center of My Storm"	Overstreet, Schlitz	3:23

== Personnel ==
As listed in liner notes.

- Mike Brignardello – bass guitar
- Paul Franklin – pedal steel guitar, lap steel guitar, pedabro
- Steve Gibson – acoustic guitar, mandolin
- Rob Hajacos – fiddle
- Christopher Harris – background vocals
- Shane Keister – keyboards
- Jana King – background vocals
- Janie Lambert – background vocals
- Paul Leim – drums
- Terry McMillan – percussion, harmonica, tambourine
- Jerry McPherson – electric guitar, tremolo guitar, E-bow, gut string guitar
- Mark O'Connor – fiddle
- Paul Overstreet – lead vocals, background vocals
- Don Potter – acoustic guitar
- Chris Rodriguez – background vocals
- Lisa Silver – background vocals
- Pam Tillis – background vocals
- Bergen White – background vocals
- Bob Wray – bass guitar
- Trisha Yearwood – background vocals
- Reggie Young – electric guitar

== Charts ==
=== Weekly charts ===
Chart (1991)	Peak position
US Billboard 200	163
US Christian Albums (Billboard)	21
US Top Country Albums (Billboard)	17

=== Year-end charts ===
Chart (1991)	Position
US Top Country Albums (Billboard)	43
