= Tear Me Apart =

Studio album by Tanya Tucker
- Released: 1979
- Genre: Country, rock
- Length: 35:58
- Label: MCA
- Producer: Mike Chapman

Tanya Tucker chronology
TNT (1978)	Tear Me Apart (1979)	Dreamlovers (1980)

Singles from Tear Me Apart
- 1. "Lay Back in the Arms of Someone" Released: November 5, 1979; 2. "San Francisco (Be Sure to Wear Some Flowers in Your Hair) / I Left My Heart in San Francisco" Released: February 15, 1980

Tear Me Apart is a studio album by American country music artist Tanya Tucker, released in 1979. Produced by Mike Chapman, who along with longtime songwriting partner Nicky Chinn, wrote two of its songs, it continues the more rock-based sound begun on the preceding TNT. The album rose to the No. 33 position on the Billboard Country Albums chart, although there were no charting singles in the United States for the first time in Tucker's career.

== Critical reception ==
Professional ratings
Review scores
Source	Rating
AllMusic	3/5 stars
Record Mirror	3/5 stars

The Globe and Mail noted that "occasionally the album drifts a little, as Tanya seems unsure as to whether she wants to emulate Janis Joplin, Tammy Wynette or Yvonne Elliman as far as style goes."

== Track listing ==
No.	Title	Writer(s)	Length
1.	"Blind Love"	Dennis Linde	3:25
2.	"Lay Back in the Arms of Someone"	Nicky Chinn, Mike Chapman	4:11
3.	"Somebody Must Have Loved You Right Last Night"	Ken Bell	3:30
4.	"San Francisco (Be Sure to Wear Some Flowers in Your Hair) / I Left My Heart in San Francisco"	John Phillips, George Cory, Douglas Cross	3:20
5.	"Tear Me Apart"	Chinn, Chapman	3:05
6.	"Crossfire of Desire"	Casey Kelly, Julie Didier, Lewis Anderson	4:09
7.	"Better Late Than Never"	Steve Krikorian [Tonio K]	3:42
8.	"I've Never Said No Before"	Mark Gray	3:33
9.	"Shady Streets"	Dickey Betts, Dan Toler, Billy Ray Reynolds	3:50
10.	"By Day by Day"	Linde	3:13

== Personnel ==
- Tanya Tucker – lead vocals
- Beau Segal – drums, percussion
- Jeff Eyrich – bass guitar
- Steve Goldstein – keyboards
- Bill Andersen, Jerry Swallow – guitar
- Jerry Swallow – mandolin
- Jerry Peterson – saxophone
- Bill Andersen, Rusty Buchanan, Steve Goldstein, Lynda Lawley, Sue Richman, Andrea Robinson, Julia Tillman Waters, Tanya Tucker, Luther Waters, Oren Waters, Maxine Willard Waters – backing vocals
