= Me and My Baby =

Single by Paul Overstreet

from the album Love Is Strong
- B-side: "Lord She Sure Is Good at Loving Me"
- Released: July 11, 1992
- Genre: Country
- Length: 3:39
- Label: RCA Nashville
- Songwriter(s): Paul Overstreet, Paul Davis
- Producer(s): Brown Bannister, Paul Overstreet

Paul Overstreet singles chronology
"Billy Can't Read" (1992)	"Me and My Baby" (1992)	"Still Out There Swinging" (1992)

"Me and My Baby" is a song co-written and recorded by American country music artist Paul Overstreet. It was released in July 1992 as the first single from the album Love Is Strong. The song reached #22 on the Billboard Hot Country Singles & Tracks chart. The song was written by Overstreet and Paul Davis.

It should not be confused with a song of the same name from the Broadway musical Chicago.

== Chart performance ==
Chart (1992)	Peak position
US Hot Country Songs (Billboard)	22
Canadian RPM Country Tracks	27
