= Love Knows We Tried =

Single by Tanya Tucker

from the album Dream Lovers
- B-side: "Somebody (Trying to Tell You Something)"
- Released: April 1981
- Recorded: May 1980
- Genre: Country pop
- Length: 3:48
- Label: MCA
- Songwriter(s): Rory Bourke; Kerry Chater; Jan Crutchfield
- Producer(s): Jerry Crutchfield

Tanya Tucker singles chronology
"Can I See You Tonight" (1980)	"Love Knows We Tried" (1981)	"Should I Do It" (1981)

"Love Knows We Tried" is a song written by Rory Bourke, Kerry Chater and Jan Crutchfield, and recorded by American country music artist, Tanya Tucker. It released in April 1981 as the third single from the album Dreamlovers. The song reached the top forty of the North American country music charts.

== Background, recording and chart performance ==
At age 13, Tanya Tucker broke through into the country music mainstream with the top ten single, "Delta Dawn". A string of singles followed on Columbia Records that reached the top ten and the number one. A record label switch in 1975 proved successful as Tucker continued having top ten and number one singles through the end of the seventies. In 1980 however, her popularity began to wane and she had only two major hits that year. In 1981, she reached the top ten only once with the single "Can I See You Tonight" from her album Dreamlovers. "Love Knows We Tried" would also reach the top 40. The song was written by Rory Bourke, Kerry Chater and Jan Crutchfield. Tucker recorded the track in May 1980 in Nashville, Tennessee alongside producer Jerry Crutchfield.

"Love Knows We Tried" first appeared as an album track on Tucker's 1980 LP, Dreamlovers. It was issued as the third and final single from the project in April 1981. It spent a total of eight weeks on the American Billboard Hot Country Songs, climbing to the number 40 position by May 1981. It reached the same position on the Canadian RPM Country chart around the same time.

== Track listing ==
7" vinyl single

- "Love Knows We Tried" – 3:48
- "Somebody (Trying to Tell You Something)" – 3:35

== Chart performance ==
Chart (1981)	Peak position
Canada Country Singles (RPM)	40
US Hot Country Songs (Billboard)	40
