= Changes (Tanya Tucker album) =

Studio album by Tanya Tucker
- Released: September 6, 1982
- Recorded: 1982
- Studio: Sound Stage Studio (Nashville); Sound Lab (Nashville); Bennett House (Franklin); West Wind (Nashville)
- Genre: Country
- Length: 35:06
- Label: Arista
- Producer: David Malloy

Tanya Tucker chronology
Live (1982)	Changes (1982)	Girls Like Me (1986)

Singles from Changes
- 1. "Cry" Released: September 6, 1982; 2. "Feel Right" Released: November 8, 1982; 3. "Changes" Released: April 11, 1983; 4. "Baby I'm Yours" Released: July 11, 1983

Changes is the 14th studio album by American country music singer Tanya Tucker. It was released on September 6, 1982, by Arista Records and would be her only album for the label. The album was produced by David Malloy and peaked at number 47 on the Billboard Top Country LPs chart. Four singles were released from the album, the most successful being the track "Feel Right" which peaked at number 10 on the Billboard Hot Country Singles chart.

== Critical reception ==
Professional ratings
Review scores
Source	Rating
AllMusic	2/5 stars

Billboard gave a positive review of the album. The review noted Tucker's change in genre from country and rock 'n' roll to a more MOR and adult contemporary pop sound, but went on to say that her "previous influences are [still] there." They praised Tucker's vocal performance as "strong and distinct" and the productions as "subtle enough" to allow Tucker's "unique persona" to come through. The review concluded by saying that the album maintains an "endearing roughness" and "hard edge" to keep it from completely "dissolving into commercial pop."

== Track listing ==
Side one
No.	Title	Writer(s)	Length
1.	"Cry"	Garth Murphy; Frank Musker	4:08
2.	"Shame on the Moon"	Rodney Crowell	4:50
3.	"Until You're Mine"	Thom Schuyler; Billy Walker; David Malloy	3:24
4.	"Baby I'm Yours"	Van Allen McCoy	3:31
5.	"I Don't Want You to Go"	Bruce Roberts; Allee Willis	3:57

Side two
No.	Title	Writer(s)	Length
1.	"Heartache and a Half"	Eddie Struzick; Deborah Allen; Rafe Van Hoy	3:20
2.	"Changes"	Tanya Tucker; Frank J. Myers; Eddy Raven	4:15
3.	"Feel Right"	Larry Byrom	2:24
4.	"A Thing Called Love"	Jerry Reed	2:09
5.	"Too Long"	Mike Donovan	3:08

== Chart performance ==
Chart (1982)	Peak position
U.S. Billboard Top Country Albums	47
