= Should I Do It (song) =

"Should I Do It" is a song composed by Layng Martine Jr. which in 1981 was a minor C&W hit for Tanya Tucker, becoming a Top 40 hit in 1982 for the Pointer Sisters.

== Overview ==
"Should I Do It" was recorded in the first months of 1981 by both Tanya Tucker and the Pointer Sisters for their respective mid-year album releases: Tucker's Should I Do It and the Pointers' Black & White. Although written by veteran C&W composer Layng Martine Jr. - who'd recall "Should I Do It" as an example of how "sometimes...a song just appears in my brain and kind of writes itself fast" - even as recorded by C&W superstar songstress Tucker "Should I Do It" was not considered a standard C&W number: Cashbox magazine described Tucker's version as a blend of "the girl group classic "[Please] Mr. Postman", with a honky tonk piano and a brief doo wop bit". As recorded by the Pointer Sisters the song was a more overt homage to the girl-group hit sound of the early 1960s. A chart disappointment for Tucker in the summer of 1981 - stalling at #50 C&W - , "Should I Do It" as recorded by the Pointers would reach the Top 20 of the Billboard Hot 100 in early 1982 although it would not rank among the group's very biggest hits being a Top Ten shortfall.

== Tanya Tucker version ==
"Should I Do It"

Single by Tanya Tucker

from the album Should I Do It
- B-side: "Lucky Enough For Two"
- Released: June 1981
- Recorded: April 1981
- Studio: Sound Labs, Hollywood CA
- Genre: Country
- Length: 3:00
- Label: MCA
- Songwriter: Layng Martine Jr
- Producer: Gary Klein

Tanya Tucker singles chronology
"Love Knows We Tried" (1981)	"Should I Do It" (1981)	"Rodeo Girls" (1981)

Tanya Tucker recorded "Should I Do It" in the sessions for her twelfth studio album - which would be entitled Should I Do It - at the Hollywood Studio the Sound Labs in April 1981. Tucker was produced by Gary Klein, a veteran producer of several Pop & C&W acts including Tucker's swain Glen Campbell.

The Tucker/ Campbell May-December romance was perennial tabloid press fodder, with reports, particularly from February 1981, attesting to the romance being a rocky one. Tucker's tabloid profile seemingly undermined her recording career: subsequent to a Top Ten C&W hit: "Can I See You Tonight", in February and March 1981, Tucker's two springtime single releases were both chart disappointments, with "Love Knows We Tried", stalling at #40 on the Billboard C&W chart where the Tucker/ Campbell duet: "Why Don't We Just Sleep on It Tonight", barely ranked at #85.

=== Charts ===
Chart (1981–1982)	Peak position
Billboard Hot Country Singles	50
Cashbox Top 100 Country	38
Record World Country Singles	45
Record World Singles 100-150	131
RPM (Canada) Country Singles	16

Released in June 1981 as the lead single from the album of the same name, "Should I Do It" failed to reverse Tucker's chart fortunes: despite spending seven weeks on the Record World Singles 101–150 chart rising as high as No. 131, "Should I Do It" rose no higher than No. 45 on the magazine's Country Singles chart - with a similar peak (No. 50) on the Hot Country Singles chart in Billboard - indicating a lack of support from C&W radio.

== Pointer Sisters version ==
"Should I Do It"

Single by The Pointer Sisters

from the album Black & White
- B-side: "We're Gonna Make It"
- Released: December 1981
- Recorded: 1981
- Genre: Pop; doo-wop
- Length: 3:53
- Label: Planet
- Songwriter: Layng Martine Jr
- Producer: Richard Perry

The Pointer Sisters singles chronology
"Sweet Lover Man" (1980)	"Should I Do It" (1981)	"American Music" (1982)

"Should I Do It" was one of two songs by Nashville-based composers to be recorded by the Pointer Sisters for their June 1981 Black & White album release, the other being the album's lead single: "Slow Hand" which had reached #2 on the Billboard Hot 100. Like "Slow Hand", "Should I Do It" was recorded by the Pointers with their regular producer Richard Perry so as to barely resemble a standard C&W song: in the case of "Should I Do It" the Pointers turned the song into (Ruth Pointer quote:) "an ode to the early '60s girl groups in the vein of the Shirelles and the Chiffons." The Pointers had a #3 hit in 1980 with "He's So Shy", which had evoked the elements of the late 1950s/early 1960s girl group classics while being a contemporary number. With "Should I Do It", June Pointer (the lead vocalist on "Should I Do It" and "He's So Shy") had sung lead on "a marvelous recreation - as opposed to modernization - of the late '50s/early '60s sound of the all-girl vocal groups."

"Should I Do It" was mentioned as the choice for the second single from Black & White, and at the time of the album's release it was announced that music videos would be shot for both "Slow Hand" and "Should I Do It"; "Slow Hand" was promoted via video as the first single. The label then decided to release two other songs as singles from Black and White; "What a Surprise" and "Sweet Lover Man", released in October and November of 1981, respectively. Neither became a significant hit. In December 1981, the label released "Should I Do It" as an unprecedented, at the time, fourth single from a Pointer Sisters album. The song became a major hit, rising to #13 on the US Billboard Hot 100, dated April 3, 1982. This made Black & White the first Pointer Sisters album to spawn two Top 20 US hits. "Should I Do It" also reached #19 on the Billboard Adult Contemporary chart.

Outside of the U.S. and Canada, "Should I Do It" was released in November 1981 as the immediate follow-up single to "Slow Hand" with the single reaching the Top 20 in Australia, Flemish Belgium, and the Netherlands prior to its January 1982 Billboard US Hot 100 debut. "Should I Do It" had its greatest chart impact in Belgium's Flemish Region and the Netherlands with respective peaks of #6 and #12, topping the chart peak in those territories for "Slow Hand" (#22 Belgium and #33 Netherlands).

The Pointer Sisters would record another Layng Martine Jr. composition: "I Want to Do It With You", to serve as B-side of their followup single to "Should I Do It": "American Music". (Never featured on a Pointer Sisters' album, "I Want to Do It With You" - as "I Wanna Do It With You" - would become a Top Ten UK hit for Barry Manilow in 1983).

Chart (1981–1982)	Peak position
Australia (Kent Music Report)	16
Belgium (BEL charts)	6
Canada Top Singles (RPM)	37
Canada Adult Contemporary (RPM)	29
Germany	75
Netherlands (Dutch Top 40)	12
New Zealand (RIANZ)	22
UK Singles (Official Charts)	50
US Billboard Hot 100	13
US Adult Contemporary (Billboard)	19
US Cashbox Top 100 Singles	16
US Record World	15
US Record World A/C	15

Year-end chart (1982)	Ranking
US Top Pop Singles of 1982	89
