= Love Is Strong (album) =

Studio album by Paul Overstreet
- Released: August 11, 1992
- Recorded: September 1991 – February 1992
- Studio: Crossroad Farm - Pegram, TN
- Genre: Country
- Length: 38:25
- Label: RCA Nashville
- Producer: Brown Bannister; Paul Overstreet

Paul Overstreet chronology
Heroes (1991)	Love Is Strong (1992)	The Best of Paul Overstreet (1994)

Professional ratings
Review scores
Source	Rating
Allmusic -	3/5 stars

Love Is Strong is the fourth studio album by American country music artist Paul Overstreet. Released in 1992, it produced three singles, "Me and My Baby", "Still Out There Swinging" and "Take Another Run". While this album was not as successful as his previous two, "Me And My Baby" managed to reach the top 40; the others did not. The album itself peaked at #28 on the Billboard Top Christian Albums Chart while only reaching #60 on the Top Country Albums chart.

The song "There But for the Grace of God Go I" also won a Dove Award for Country Recorded Song of the Year at the 24th GMA Dove Awards in 1993.

== Content ==
All songs were written or co-written by Paul Overstreet. "Lord She Sure is Good at Loving Me" was co-written with country music artist Randy Travis. Christian music singers Susan Ashton and Lisa Bevill provided background vocals on several songs while Kathie Baillie, lead singer for the country group Baillie & the Boys, sings backup on "Me and my Baby". Glen Campbell also sings harmony vocals on "What's Going without Saying".

== Track listing ==
No.	Title	Writer(s)	Length
1.	"Take Another Run"	Paul Overstreet, Don Schlitz	3:52
2.	"Still Out There Swinging"	Overstreet	3:08
3.	"Me and My Baby"	Overstreet, Paul Davis	3:39
4.	"There But for the Grace of God Go I"	Overstreet, Taylor Dunn	4:58
5.	"Love Is Strong"	Overstreet, Archie Jordan	4:12
6.	"Head Over Heels"	Overstreet, Davis	3:54
7.	"What's Going Without Saying"	Overstreet, Jeff Borders	4:38
8.	"Take Some Action"	Overstreet, Tom Campbell	4:08
9.	"Lord She Sure Is Good at Loving Me"	Overstreet, Randy Travis	3:08
10.	"'Till the Answer Comes (Gotta Keep Praying)"	Overstreet, Fred Carpenter, Billy Prince	2:48

== Personnel ==
Taken from liner notes.

- Susan Ashton – background vocals on "What's Going Without Saying"
- Kathie Baillie – background vocals
- Lisa Bevill – background vocals
- Mike Brignardello – bass guitar
- Glen Campbell – background vocals on "What's Going Without Saying"
- Keith Compton – electric guitar
- David Davidson – strings
- Paul Davis – background vocals
- Kim Fleming – background vocals on "Love is Strong"
- Paul Franklin – steel guitar, lap steel guitar, pedabro
- Sonny Garrish – steel guitar on "Head Over Heels" and "Lord She Sure is Good at Loving Me", lap steel guitar
- Steve Gibson – electric guitar, acoustic guitar
- Carl Gorodetzky – strings
- Buddy Greene – background vocals on "'Till the Answer Comes (Gotta Keep Praying)"
- Rob Hajacos – fiddle
- Vicki Hampton – background vocals
- Christopher Harris – background vocals
- Tom Hemby – acoustic guitar, electric guitar
- Yvonne Hodges – background vocals
- Shane Keister – keyboards
- Jana King – background vocals on "Love is Strong" and "Lord She Sure is Good at Loving Me"
- Wayne Kirkpatrick – background vocals
- Lee Larrison – strings
- Paul Leim – drums
- Ted Madson – strings
- Bob Mason – strings
- Terry McMillan – percussion
- Paul Overstreet – lead vocals, background vocals
- Matt Rollings – keyboards, piano
- Lisa Silver – background vocals
- Harry Stinson – background vocals
- Alan Umstaed – strings
- Gary Van Osdale – strings
- D. Bergen White – background vocals on "Love is Strong" and "Lord She Sure is Good at Loving Me"
- Kristin Wilkinson – strings
- Kelly Willard – background vocals on "What's Going Without Saying" and "'Till the Answer Comes (Gotta Keep Praying)"
- Bob Wray – bass guitar
- Reggie Young – electric guitar

== Chart performance ==
Chart (1992)	Peak position
U.S. Billboard Top Country Albums	60
U.S. Billboard Top Christian Albums	28
