= Sowin' Love =

Studio album by Paul Overstreet
- Released: April 1, 1989
- Recorded: 1988
- Studio: The Reflections Nashville, TN
- Genre: Country
- Label: RCA Nashville
- Producer: James Stroud

Paul Overstreet chronology
Paul Overstreet (1982)	Sowin' Love (1989)	Heroes (1991)

Singles from Sowin' Love
- 1. "Love Helps Those" Released: August 1988; 2. "Sowin' Love" Released: March 1989; 3. "All the Fun" Released: July 1989; 4. "Seein' My Father in Me" Released: January 6, 1990; 5. "Richest Man on Earth" Released: April 1990

Professional ratings
Review scores
Source	Rating
Allmusic	4.5/5 stars

Sowin' Love is the second studio album by American country music artist Paul Overstreet. The album was released by RCA Nashville in 1989 (see 1989 in country music). The album reached #13 on Billboard's Top Country Albums chart and charted at #31 on the Top Christian Albums chart. This album produced five top ten singles.

== Track listing ==
No.	Title	Writer(s)	Length
1.	"Love Helps Those"	Paul Overstreet	3:18
2.	"All the Fun"	Overstreet, Taylor Dunn	4:03
3.	"Call the Preacher"	Overstreet	3:06
4.	"Richest Man on Earth"	Overstreet, Don Schlitz	3:07
5.	"Sowin' Love"	Overstreet, Schlitz	3:48
6.	"Love Never Sleeps"	Overstreet	4:16
7.	"Dig Another Well"	Overstreet, Schlitz	2:58
8.	"Seein' My Father in Me"	Overstreet, Dunn	3:23
9.	"What God Has Joined Together"	Overstreet, Paul Davis	3:03
10.	"Homemaker"	Overstreet, Eugene D. Tyler	3:27
11.	"Neath the Light of Your Love"	Overstreet, Schlitz	3:30

== Charts ==
=== Weekly charts ===
Chart (1989–1990)	Peak position
US Christian Albums (Billboard)	31
US Top Country Albums (Billboard)	13

=== Year-end charts ===
Chart (1990)	Position
US Top Country Albums (Billboard)	25
