= TNT (Tanya Tucker album) =

Studio album by Tanya Tucker
- Released: November 6, 1978
- Recorded: November 20, 1977–September 1978
- Studio: Kendun Recorders (Burbank)
- Genre: Country; rock
- Length: 39:51
- Label: MCA
- Producer: Jerry Goldstein

Tanya Tucker chronology
Tanya Tucker's Greatest Hits (1978)	TNT (1978)	Tear Me Apart (1979)

Singles from TNT
- 1. "Not Fade Away" Released: November 13, 1978; 2. "Texas (When I Die)" Released: November 13, 1978; 3. "I'm the Singer, You're the Song" Released: March 19, 1979; 4. "Lover Goodbye" Released: March 19, 1979

TNT is the ninth studio album by American country music singer Tanya Tucker. It was released on November 6, 1978, by MCA Records. Working with a new producer in Jerry Goldstein, Tucker drifts away from her earlier country style to do a much more rock-based effort. She covers well-known rock songs originally performed by such artists as Buddy Holly ("Not Fade Away"), Elvis Presley ("Heartbreak Hotel"), and Chuck Berry ("Brown Eyed Handsome Man"). Tucker also covers John Prine's "Angel from Montgomery". The album was Tucker's second-highest ranked ever on the Billboard Country charts at #2, and even reached #54 in the Pop category. Released singles and their Billboard positions were: "Texas (When I Die)" at #5, "Not Fade Away" at #70, and "I'm the Singer, You're the Song" at #18. While not necessarily embraced by the country music establishment, the album garnered critical and commercial success. It was certified Gold by the RIAA and earned her a Grammy nomination for Best Rock Vocal Performance, Female.

== Critical reception ==
Professional ratings
Review scores
Source	Rating
AllMusic	3.5/5 stars
Christgau's Record Guide	C+

Billboard published a review of the album in the November 18, 1978 issue, which said, "Tucker's newest release sheds a new light on her singing and image. Working within a pop framework, Tucker's vocals convey a wholesome richness, evident in her rendition of John Prine's "Angel from Montgomery" (in which he also gives background vocal help), "Not Fade Away" and others. The inside photo makes Tucker out to be a sexpot, a ploy that gives her broader appeal. Tucker is backed by a tight band which utilizes both country and rock orchestrations and strings for sweetening."

The review in the November 11, 1978 issue of Cashbox said, "If country fans have raised an eyebrow at the changes Dolly Parton has made lately, they certainly aren't ready for the 'new' Tanya Tucker. Beyond a shadow of a doubt, the cover graphics are the most blatantly sexual of any album jacket ever released by a country artist. And the music inside is tough LA rock. Tanya does throw in a small dose of country, but this is in no way a country album. At any rate, it is a fine album and should garner airplay and sales in all markets."

== Track listing ==
Side one
No.	Title	Writer(s)	Length
1.	"Lover Goodbye"	Phil Everly; Joey Paige	4:15
2.	"I'm the Singer, You're the Song"	Tanya Tucker; Jerry Goldstein	4:00
3.	"Not Fade Away"	Charles Hardin; Norman Petty	4:02
4.	"Angel from Montgomery"	John Prine	4:45
5.	"Heartbreak Hotel"	Elvis Presley; Tommy Durden; Mae Boren Axton	3:32

Side two
No.	Title	Writer(s)	Length
1.	"Brown Eyed Handsome Man"	Chuck Berry	2:18
2.	"The River and the Wind"	Jim Weatherly	4:02
3.	"If You Feel It"	Goldstein; Jimmy Ford	4:37
4.	"It's Nice to Be with You"	Goldstein	3:30
5.	"Texas (When I Die)"	Ed Bruce; Patsy Bruce; Bobby Borchers	4:50

== Production ==
- Produced By Jerry Goldstein
- Engineered & Mixed By Ed Barton
- Digital Editing: Milan Bogdan
- Mastered By Glenn Meadows

== Personnel ==
- Tanya Tucker - lead vocals
- Paul Leim - drums, percussion, electronic drums
- Jerry Scheff - bass guitar
- John Hobbs - piano
- Lonnie Jordan - organ
- Billy Joe Walker Jr. - acoustic and electric guitar, mandolin
- Jerry Swallow - electric guitar, dobro, mandolin
- Mickey Raphael - harmonica
- Larry Muhoberac - string arrangements
- Curt Boettcher, Joe Chemay, Dash Crofts, Phil Everly, Venetta Fields, Jerry Goldstein, La Costa, Michael McGinnis, Brent Nelson, Joey Paige, Jody Payne, John Prine, Jim Seals, Julia Tillman-Waters, Tanya Tucker, Luther Waters, Oren Waters, Lorna Willard - background vocals

== Charts ==
=== Weekly charts ===
Chart (1978–1979)	Peak position
US Billboard 200	54
US Top Country Albums (Billboard)	2

=== Year-end charts ===
Chart (1979)	Position
US Top Country Albums (Billboard)	12

== In popular culture ==
A physical copy of the album was seen in the 2011 movie Footloose.
