= I'm the Singer, You're the Song =

Single by Tanya Tucker

from the album TNT
- B-side: "Lover Goodbye"
- Released: March 1979
- Recorded: September 1978
- Studio: Kendun Recorders
- Genre: Country rock
- Length: 4:00
- Label: MCA
- Songwriters: Tanya Tucker; Jerry Goldstein
- Producer: Jerry Goldstein

Tanya Tucker singles chronology
"Texas (When I Die)" (1978)	"I'm the Singer, You're the Song" (1979)	"Lay Back in the Arms of Someone" (1979)

"I'm the Singer, You're the Song" is a song by American country music artist Tanya Tucker. It was co-written by Tucker, along with Jerry Goldstein. It was released in March 1979 and became a top 20 single on the American country songs chart and a top ten single on the Canadian country songs chart. It was the second single from Tucker's album TNT.

== Background and recording ==
Tanya Tucker reached commercial stardom at age 13 when her debut single, "Delta Dawn", became a top ten country song. It was followed by several chart-topping country songs on Columbia Records like "What's Your Mama's Name" and "Blood Red and Goin' Down". In 1975, she switched to MCA Records, where Tucker's popularity continued with a string of number one and top ten country singles. In 1978, Tucker decided to make changes to her musical image with the release of the country rock album, TNT. One of the songs included on TNT was the track "I'm the Singer, You're the Song". The track was penned by Tucker herself, along with the album's producer, Jerry Goldstein. The song was recorded at Kendum Recorders, a studio located in Burbank, California. The session was held in September 1978.

== Release and chart performance ==
"I'm the Singer, You're the Song" first appeared as an album track on Tucker's TNT album in 1978. It was spawned as the album's second single in March 1979. It was issued as a double A-side single in conjunction with "Lover Goodbye". However, both songs reached different chart positions. "I'm the Singer, You're the Song" reached the top 20 of the American Billboard Hot Country Songs chart. After 13 weeks, it peaked at number 18 in June 1979. It was even more commercially successful on the Canadian RPM Country chart, peaking at number six. On the Canadian RPM Adult Contemporary chart, it peaked at number 25 around the same time.

== Track listing ==
7" double A-side vinyl single

- "I'm the Singer, You're the Song" – 4:00
- "Lover Goodbye" – 4:15

== Chart performance ==
Chart (1979)	Peak position
Canada Adult Contemporary Singles (RPM)	25
Canada Country Singles (RPM)	6
US Hot Country Songs (Billboard)	18
