= Dreamlovers (album) =

Studio album by Tanya Tucker
- Released: September 29, 1980
- Genre: Country
- Length: 30:16
- Label: MCA
- Producer: Jerry Crutchfield

Tanya Tucker chronology
Tear Me Apart (1979)	Dreamlovers (1980)	Should I Do It (1981)

Singles from Dreamlovers
- 1. "Dream Lover" Released: September 8, 1980; 2. "Can I See You Tonight" Released: December 1, 1980; 3. "Love Knows We Tried" Released: April 6, 1981

Professional ratings
Review scores
Source	Rating
Allmusic	3/5 stars
Billboard	(unrated)

Dreamlovers is the 11th studio album by American country music artist Tanya Tucker. It was released on September 29, 1980, by MCA Records. The album features two duets with Glen Campbell, "My Song" and "Dream Lover", a song written and originally sung by Bobby Darin in 1959, which was released as a single. It peaked at only #59 on the Billboard Country Singles chart. The biggest hit single from the album was "Can I See You Tonight," which peaked at #4. Another charting single was the #40 "Love Knows We Tried." The album itself peaked at #41 on the Country Albums chart.

== Track listing ==
No.	Title	Writer(s)	Length
1.	"Can I See You Tonight"	Deborah Allen, Rafe Van Hoy	2:49
2.	"Love Knows We Tried"	Jan Crutchfield, Kerry Chater, Rory Bourke	3:48
3.	"I've Got Somebody"	Randy Goodrum	2:39
4.	"Let Me Count the Ways"	Jerry Crutchfield, Clair Cloninger	3:24
5.	"Dream Lover" (duet with Glen Campbell)	Bobby Darin	2:56
6.	"Somebody (Trying to Tell You Something)"	Steve Hardin	3:35
7.	"All the Way"	Bob Morrison, Jim Zerface	2:28
8.	"Tennessee Woman"	Jimmy Webb	2:54
9.	"Don't You Want to Be a Lover Tonight"	Sterling Whipple	2:45
10.	"My Song" (duet with Glen Campbell)	Hardin	2:58

== Personnel ==
- Tanya Tucker, Glen Campbell - vocals
- Steve Hardin, Steve Goldstein, Bobby Wood - keyboards
- Jerry Swallow, Jon Goin, Pete Wade, Johnny Christopher - guitar
- Bill McCubbin, Jack Williams, Joe Osborn, Neil Stubenhaus - bass guitar
- Steve Turner, Buster Phillips, Jerry Carrigan - drums
- Tanya Tucker, Glen Campbell, Mel Tillis, Sheri Kramer, Bergen White, Diane Tidwell - backing vocals

== Production ==
- Producer - Jerry Crutchfield
- Engineers - Brent Mather, Rick McCollister
- Photography - Allen Messer
- Art Direction - George Osaki
- Design - Marilyn Romen/Sweet Art
- Mastered by Hank Williams at Woodland Sound Studios, Nashville, TN
- Vocal overdubs - MCA-Whitney, Glendale, CA

== Chart performance ==
=== Album ===
Chart (1980)	Peak position
U.S. Billboard Top Country Albums	41

=== Singles ===
Year	Single	Peak positions	
Year	Single	US Country	CAN Country
1980	"Dream Lover" (with Glen Campbell)	59	48
1980	"Can I See You Tonight"	4	4
1981	"Love Knows We Tried"	40	40
