= Feel Right (Tanya Tucker song) =

Single by Tanya Tucker

from the album Changes
- B-side: "Cry"
- Released: November 27, 1982
- Genre: Country
- Length: 2:25
- Label: Arista
- Songwriter(s): Larry Byrom
- Producer(s): David Malloy

Tanya Tucker singles chronology
"Rodeo Girls" (1982)	"Feel Right" (1982)	"Changes" (1983)

"Feel Right" is a song written by Larry Byrom, and recorded by American country music artist Tanya Tucker. It was released in November 1982 as the first single from the album Changes. The song reached #10 on the Billboard Hot Country Singles & Tracks chart.

== Chart performance ==
Chart (1982–1983)	Peak position
US Hot Country Songs (Billboard)	10
