= Should I Do It (album) =

Studio album by Tanya Tucker
- Released: June 29, 1981
- Genre: Country
- Label: MCA
- Producer: Gary Klein

Tanya Tucker chronology
| Dreamlovers (1980) | Should I Do It (1981) | Live (1982) |

Singles from Should I Do It
- 1. "Should I Do It" Released: June 15, 1981; 2. "Rodeo Girls" Released: September 21, 1981

Professional ratings
Review scores
| Source | Rating |
|---|---|
| AllMusic | 3/5 stars |

Should I Do It is the 12th studio album by American country music artist Tanya Tucker, released on June 29, 1981, by MCA Records. Two singles from the album, "Should I Do It," and "Rodeo Girls" peaked at 50 and 81 respectively on the Billboard Country Singles chart. The album peaked at number 48 on the Top Country Albums chart.

== Track listing ==
1. "Should I Do It" (Layng Martine Jr.)
2. "Stormy Weather" [with Emmylou Harris] (Tom Snow, Leo Sayer)
3. "Halfway to Heaven" (Jerry Goldstein, Robert E. Getter, Guy F. Peritore)
4. "Heartache #3" (Joe Rainey)
5. "You Don't Have to Say You Love Me" (Pino Donaggio, Simon Napier-Bell, Vicki Wickham)
6. "Rodeo Girls" (Tanya Tucker, Joe Rainey)
7. "I Oughta Let Go" (Troy Seals, Eddie Setser, Steve Diamond)
8. "Lucky Enough for Two" (Henry Gaffney)
9. "We're Playing Games Again" (Troy Seals, Richard Kerr)
10. "Shoulder to Shoulder" [with Glen Campbell] (Henry Gaffney)

== Personnel ==
- Tanya Tucker – lead vocals
- Rick Shlosser, Steve Turner – drums, percussion
- Bill McCubbin, Leland Sklar – bass guitar
- Larry Muhoberac, Jai Winding – piano
- Bill Cuomo – synthesizer
- Buzz Feiten, Jay Dee Maness, Dean Parks, Lee Ritenour, Jerry Swallow, Fred Tackett – guitar
- Jerry Swallow – mandolin
- Chuck Findley, Jerry Hey, Jim Horn, Andrew Love, James Mitchell – horns
- Nick DeCaro – accordion
- John Bahler, Debbie Hall, Emmylou Harris, Ron Hicklin, Sandie Hill, Gene Morford, Herb Pedersen, Jerry Whitman – additional vocals

== Chart performance ==
| Chart (1981) | Peak position |
|---|---|
| U.S. Billboard 200 | 180 |
| U.S. Billboard Top Country Albums | 48 |
