= Call on Me (Tanya Tucker song) =

- Cassette single cover art

Single by Tanya Tucker

from the album Strong Enough to Bend
- B-side: "Daddy and Home"
- Released: April 1, 1989
- Genre: Country
- Length: 3:22
- Label: Capitol Nashville
- Songwriter: Gary Scruggs
- Producer: Jerry Crutchfield

Tanya Tucker singles chronology
"Highway Robbery" (1988)	"Call on Me" (1989)	"Daddy and Home" (1989)

"Call on Me" is a song written by Gary Scruggs, and recorded by American country music artist Tanya Tucker. It was released in April 1989 as the third single from the album Strong Enough to Bend. The song reached #4 on the Billboard Hot Country Singles & Tracks chart.

== Charts ==
=== Weekly charts ===
Chart (1989)	Peak position
Canada Country Singles (RPM)	4
US Hot Country Songs (Billboard)	4

=== Year-end charts ===
Chart (1989)	Position
Canada Country Tracks (RPM)	62
US Country Songs (Billboard)	62
