= Just Another Love =

Single by Tanya Tucker

from the album Girls Like Me
- B-side: "You Could Change My Mind"
- Released: June 1986 (U.S.)
- Recorded: 1985
- Genre: Country pop
- Length: 3:10
- Label: Capitol
- Songwriter(s): Paul Davis
- Producer(s): Jerry Crutchfield

Tanya Tucker singles chronology
"One Love at a Time" (1986)	"Just Another Love" (1986)	"I'll Come Back as Another Woman" (1986)

"Just Another Love" is a song written by Paul Davis, and recorded by American country music artist Tanya Tucker. It was released in June 1986 as the second single from the album Girls Like Me. Paul first recorded it and released it in 1978 on his Singer of Songs - Teller of Tales album on Bang Records.

== Success ==
The song was Tucker's seventh No. 1 on the Billboard Hot Country Singles chart. The song stayed in the Top 40 of the Hot Country Singles chart for 14 weeks. "Just Another Love' was Tanya Tucker's first No. 1 hit in 10 years, since "Here's Some Love" went to number one in October 1976.

== Chart performance ==
Chart (1986)	Peak position
US Hot Country Songs (Billboard)	1
Canadian RPM Country Tracks	1
