= Highway Robbery (song) =

- Cassette single cover art

Single by Tanya Tucker

from the album Strong Enough to Bend
- B-side: "Lonesome Town"
- Released: December 3, 1988
- Genre: Country
- Length: 3:30
- Label: Capitol Nashville
- Songwriter(s): Tom Shapiro, Michael Garvin, Bucky Jones
- Producer(s): Jerry Crutchfield

Tanya Tucker singles chronology
"Strong Enough to Bend" (1988)	"Highway Robbery" (1988)	"Call on Me" (1989)

"Highway Robbery" is a song written by Tom Shapiro, Michael Garvin and Bucky Jones, and recorded by American country music artist Tanya Tucker. It was released in December 1988 as the second single from the album Strong Enough to Bend. The song reached #2 on the Billboard Hot Country Singles & Tracks chart.

== Chart performance ==
Chart (1988–1989)	Peak position
US Hot Country Songs (Billboard)	2
Canadian RPM Country Tracks	1

=== Year-end charts ===
Chart (1989)	Position
Canada Country Tracks (RPM)	19
US Country Songs (Billboard)	21
