= Love Helps Those =

Single by Paul Overstreet

from the album Sowin' Love
- B-side: "What God Has Joined"
- Released: August 1988
- Genre: Country
- Length: 3:21
- Label: MTM (original release); RCA Nashville (reissue)
- Songwriter(s): Paul Overstreet
- Producer(s): James Stroud

Paul Overstreet singles chronology
"I Won't Take Less Than Your Love" (1987)	"Love Helps Those" (1988)	"Sowin' Love" (1989)

"Love Helps Those" is a song written and recorded by American country music artist Paul Overstreet. It was released in August 1988 as the first single from his album Sowin' Love. The song reached #3 on the Billboard Hot Country Singles & Tracks chart in December 1988.

== Background ==
At the time, many of Overstreet's songs played on contemporary Christian themes of love, devotion, fellowship and service to others. "Love Helps Those" primarily fit the latter of those themes: service in helping others in their time of need.

== Content ==
Through brief stories of calling upon an elderly woman who was no longer able to drive or get out and about, a farmer who had become ill and needed help planting his crops and maintaining his farm, and a single mother with a newborn baby who needed a loving companion and father, those who offer a helping hand and guidance end up bettering and enriching everyone's lives. (For instance, the elderly woman was able to get the things she needs to remain in her home and ease her loneliness, the farmer was able to recover and had his best harvest yields ever, and the single mother found a man who helped her establish a loving family.)

== Chart performance ==
Chart (1988–1989)	Peak position
US Hot Country Songs (Billboard)	3
Canadian RPM Country Tracks	9
