= If It Don't Come Easy =

Single by Tanya Tucker

from the album Love Me Like You Used To
- B-side: "I'll Tennessee You in My Dreams"
- Released: February 1988
- Genre: Country
- Length: 3:32
- Label: Capitol
- Songwriter(s): Dave Gibson; Craig Karp
- Producer(s): Jerry Crutchfield

Tanya Tucker singles chronology
"I Won't Take Less Than Your Love" (1987)	"If It Don't Come Easy" (1988)	"Strong Enough to Bend" (1988)

"If It Don't Come Easy" is a song written by Dave Gibson and Craig Karp, and recorded by American country music artist Tanya Tucker. It was released in February 1988 as the third single from the album Love Me Like You Used To. The song was Tucker's ninth number one on the country chart. The single went to number one for one week and spent fourteen weeks on the country chart.

== Charts ==
=== Weekly charts ===
Chart (1988)	Peak position
US Hot Country Songs (Billboard)	1

=== Year-end charts ===
Chart (1988)	Position
US Hot Country Songs (Billboard)	8
