= Love Me Like You Used To =

Studio album by Tanya Tucker
- Released: July 21, 1987
- Genre: Country
- Length: 35:01
- Label: Capitol
- Producer: Jerry Crutchfield

Tanya Tucker chronology
Girls Like Me (1986)	Love Me Like You Used To (1987)	Strong Enough to Bend (1988)

Singles from Love Me Like You Used To
- 1. "Love Me Like You Used To" Released: July 13, 1987; 2. "I Won't Take Less Than Your Love" Released: November 2, 1987; 3. "If It Don't Come Easy" Released: March 21, 1988

Professional ratings
Review scores
Source	Rating
Allmusic	link
The Rolling Stone Album Guide	1992

Love Me Like You Used To is the 16th studio album by American country music artist Tanya Tucker, released in 1987. Continuing the success of her preceding comeback album Girls Like Me, the album produced three Billboard Top Ten Country singles, with "If It Don't Come Easy" and the collaboration with Paul Davis and Paul Overstreet, "I Won't Take Less Than Your Love" both peaking at #1, and the title track "Love Me Like You Used To" rising to #2. The album rose to #10 on the Country Albums chart.

== Track listing ==
No.	Title	Writer(s)	Length
1.	"If It Don't Come Easy"	Dave Gibson, Craig Karp	3:32
2.	"Love Me Like You Used To"	Paul Davis, Bobby Emmons	3:50
3.	"I Won't Take Less Than Your Love" (featuring Paul Davis and Paul Overstreet)	Paul Overstreet, Don Schlitz	3:40
4.	"I Wonder What He's Doing Tonight"	John Jarrard, Gary Nicholson	3:17
5.	"I'll Tennessee You in My Dreams"	Overstreet, Schlitz	3:35
6.	"Alien"	Bobby Braddock	3:25
7.	"Temporarily Blue"	Tommy Rocco, John Schweers, Charlie Black	2:40
8.	"If I Didn't Love You"	Deborah Allen, Rafe Van Hoy	3:16
9.	"Heartbreaker"	Joe L. Wilson	4:10
10.	"Hope You Find What You're Loving For"	Dean Dillon, Hank Cochran	3:36

== Personnel ==
- Tanya Tucker - lead vocals, backing vocals
- Eddie Bayers - drums
- Kenny Bell - acoustic guitar
- Paul Davis - vocals on "I Won't Take Less Than Your Love"
- Steve Gibson - electric guitar
- Mitch Humphries - keyboards
- Dave Innis - synthesizer
- Kenny Mims - electric guitar
- Paul Overstreet - vocals on "I Won't Take Less Than Your Love"
- James Stroud - drums
- Bob Wray - bass guitar

== Chart performance ==
Chart (1987)	Peak position
U.S. Billboard Top Country Albums	10
