= Girls Like Me =

Studio album by Tanya Tucker
- Released: March 3, 1986
- Genre: Country
- Length: 35:09
- Label: Capitol
- Producer: Jerry Crutchfield

Tanya Tucker chronology
Changes (1982)	Girls Like Me (1986)	Love Me Like You Used To (1987)

Singles from Girls Like Me
- 1. "One Love at a Time" Released: January 27, 1986; 2. "Just Another Love" Released: June 30, 1986; 3. "I'll Come Back as Another Woman" Released: October 27, 1986; 4. "It's Only Over for You" Released: March 16, 1987

Professional ratings
Review scores
Source	Rating
Allmusic	4/5 stars
The Rolling Stone Album Guide	3/5 stars

Girls Like Me is the 15th studio album by American country music singer Tanya Tucker, it was released on March 3, 1986 as her first album for Capitol Records. It included the number one country hit "Just Another Love". "I'll Come Back as Another Woman" and "One Love at a Time" would do almost as well at No. 2 and No. 3, respectively. Rounding out the Top 10 hits was the No. 8 "It's Only Over for You". The album peaked at No. 20 on the Country Albums chart.

== Track listing ==
No.	Title	Writer(s)	Length
1.	"One Love at a Time"	Paul Overstreet, Paul Davis	2:52
2.	"I'll Come Back as Another Woman"	Kent Robbins, Richard E. Carpenter	3:59
3.	"Fool, Fool Heart"	Rick Peoples, Roger Brown	3:18
4.	"Just Another Love"	Davis	3:10
5.	"Girls Like Me"	Matraca Berg, Ronnie Samoset	3:54
6.	"Somebody to Care"	Alan Rhody, Bill Caswell	3:32
7.	"It's Only Over for You"	Rory Bourke, Mike Reid	3:03
8.	"Daddy Long Legs"	Marshall Chapman	3:38
9.	"You Could Change My Mind"	Lewis Anderson	3:31
10.	"Still Hold On"	Kim Carnes, Dave Ellingson, Wendy Waldman, Eric Kaz	4:12

== Charts ==
=== Weekly charts ===
Chart (1986)	Peak position
US Top Country Albums (Billboard)	20

=== Year-end charts ===
Chart (1986)	Position
US Top Country Albums (Billboard)	47
