= It's Only Over for You =

Single by Tanya Tucker

from the album Girls Like Me
- B-side: "Girls Like Me"
- Released: March 28, 1987
- Genre: Country
- Length: 3:05
- Label: Capitol Nashville
- Songwriter(s): Mike Reid; Rory Bourke
- Producer(s): Jerry Crutchfield

Tanya Tucker singles chronology
"I'll Come Back as Another Woman" (1986)	"It's Only Over for You" (1987)	"Love Me Like You Used To" (1987)

"It's Only Over for You" is a song written by Mike Reid and Rory Bourke, and recorded by American country music artist Tammy Wynette for her 1985 album Sometimes When We Touch. In 1986, the song was recorded by Michael Johnson for his album Wings and Tanya Tucker for her album Girls Like Me. Tucker's version was released in March 1987 as the fourth single from Girls Like Me. It reached number eight on the Billboard Hot Country Singles & Tracks chart.

== Chart performance ==
Chart (1987)	Peak position
US Hot Country Songs (Billboard)	8
Canadian RPM Country Tracks	12
