= I'll Come Back as Another Woman =

Single by Tanya Tucker

from the album Girls Like Me
- B-side: "Somebody to Care"
- Released: October 1986
- Genre: Country
- Length: 4:03
- Label: Capitol Nashville
- Songwriter(s): Kent Robbins; Richard E. Carpenter
- Producer(s): Jerry Crutchfield

Tanya Tucker singles chronology
"Just Another Love" (1986)	"I'll Come Back as Another Woman" (1986)	"It's Only Over for You" (1987)

"I'll Come Back as Another Woman" is a song written by Kent Robbins and Richard E. Carpenter, and recorded by American country music artist Tanya Tucker. It first charted in November 1986 as the third single from the album Girls Like Me. The song reached number 2 on the Billboard Hot Country Singles & Tracks chart.

== Chart performance ==
Chart (1986–1987)	Peak position
US Hot Country Songs (Billboard)	2
Canadian RPM Country Tracks	1
