= Strong Enough to Bend (song) =

Single by Tanya Tucker

from the album Strong Enough to Bend
- B-side: "Back on My Feet"
- Released: June 1988
- Genre: Country
- Length: 2:43
- Label: Capitol
- Songwriter(s): Beth Nielsen Chapman; Don Schlitz
- Producer(s): Jerry Crutchfield

Tanya Tucker singles chronology
"If It Don't Come Easy" (1988)	"Strong Enough to Bend" (1988)	"Highway Robbery" (1988)

"Strong Enough to Bend" is a song written by Beth Nielsen Chapman and Don Schlitz, and recorded by American country music artist Tanya Tucker. It was released in June 1988 as the first single and title track from the album Strong Enough to Bend. The song was Tucker's ninth number one on the country chart as a solo artist. The single went to number one for one week and spent a total of fifteen weeks on the country chart.

== Charts ==
=== Weekly charts ===
Chart (1988)	Peak position
US Hot Country Songs (Billboard)	1
Canadian RPM Country Tracks	2

=== Year-end charts ===
Chart (1988)	Position
US Hot Country Songs (Billboard)	4
