= Texas (When I Die) =

Single by Tanya Tucker

from the album TNT
- A-side: "Not Fade Away"
- Released: November 25, 1978
- Genre: Country
- Length: 4:50
- Label: MCA
- Songwriters: Ed Bruce, Patsy Bruce, Bobby Borchers
- Producer: Jerry Goldstein

Tanya Tucker singles chronology
"Save Me" (1978)	"Texas (When I Die)" (1978)	"I'm the Singer, You're the Song" (1979)

"Texas (When I Die)" is a song co-written and originally recorded by American country music artist Ed Bruce. Bruce's version peaked at number 52 on the Billboard Hot Country Singles chart in 1977.

The song was covered by American country music artist Tanya Tucker, initially as the B-side of another cover, Buddy Holly's "Not Fade Away". It was released in November 1978 as the first single from her album TNT. Tucker's version reached number 5 on the Billboard Hot Country Singles chart.

== Chart performance ==
=== Ed Bruce ===
Chart (1977)	Peak position
US Hot Country Songs (Billboard)	52

=== Tanya Tucker ===
Chart (1978–1979)	Peak position
US Hot Country Songs (Billboard)	5
Canadian RPM Country Tracks	3

=== Year-end charts ===
Chart (1979)	Position
US Hot Country Songs (Billboard)	47

== In popular culture ==
Throughout the 1980s, the song was used as the Dallas Cowboys' touchdown song at their home games and as professional wrestler David Von Erich's entrance music. The Cowboys still use the song to celebrate scores at AT&T Stadium, however they now use a cover from Irish singer Seán Fahy.

Used as the closing credits for [Monster: The Ed Gein story] for Episode 3.
