= Heroes (Paul Overstreet song) =

Single by Paul Overstreet

from the album Heroes
- B-side: "Straight and Narrow"
- Released: February 1991
- Genre: Country
- Length: 4:28 (album version); 4:02 (radio edit)
- Label: RCA Nashville
- Songwriters: Paul Overstreet; Claire Cloninger
- Producers: Brown Bannister; Paul Overstreet

Paul Overstreet singles chronology
"Daddy's Come Around" (1990)	"Heroes" (1991)	"Ball and Chain" (1991)

"Heroes" is a song co-written and recorded by American country music artist Paul Overstreet. It was released in February 1991 as the second single and title track from his album Heroes. The song reached number 4 on the Billboard Hot Country Singles & Tracks chart in May 1991. It was written by Overstreet and Claire Cloninger.

== Music video ==
The music video premiered in early 1991.

== Chart performance ==
Chart (1991)	Peak position
Canada Country Singles (RPM)	6
US Hot Country Songs (Billboard)	4

=== Year-end charts ===
Chart (1991)	Position
Canada Country Tracks (RPM)	67
US Country Songs (Billboard)	39
