= Seein' My Father in Me =

Single by Paul Overstreet

from the album Sowin' Love
- B-side: "Love Never Sleeps"
- Released: January 6, 1990
- Genre: Country
- Length: 3:26
- Label: RCA Nashville
- Songwriters: Paul Overstreet, Taylor Dunn
- Producer: James Stroud

Paul Overstreet singles chronology
"All the Fun" (1989)	"Seein' My Father in Me" (1990)	"Richest Man on Earth" (1990)

"Seein' My Father in Me" is a song co-written and recorded by American country music artist Paul Overstreet. It was released in January 1990 as the fourth single from his album Sowin' Love. The song reached #2 on the Billboard Hot Country Singles & Tracks chart in March 1990. It was written by Overstreet and Taylor Dunn. The song won Country Recorded Song of the Year at the 22nd GMA Dove Awards in 1991.

== Music video ==
The music video was directed by Jack Cole. It features Overstreet singing the song, as well as interacting with shots of their fathers.

== Chart performance ==
Chart (1990)	Peak position
Canada Country Singles (RPM)	2
US Hot Country Songs (Billboard)	2

=== Year-end charts ===
Chart (1990)	Position
Canada Country Tracks (RPM)	52
US Country Songs (Billboard)	16

== Accolades ==
GMA Dove Awards

Year	Winner	Category
1991	"Seein' My Father in Me"	Country Recorded Song of the Year
