= Love Me Like You Used To (song) =

Single by Tanya Tucker

from the album Love Me Like You Used To
- B-side: "If I Didn't Love You"
- Released: July 25, 1987
- Genre: Country
- Length: 3:48
- Label: Capitol Nashville
- Songwriter(s): Paul Davis, Bobby Emmons
- Producer(s): Jerry Crutchfield

Tanya Tucker singles chronology
"It's Only Over for You" (1987)	"Love Me Like You Used To" (1987)	"I Won't Take Less Than Your Love" (1987)

"Love Me Like You Used To" is a song written by Paul Davis and Bobby Emmons, and recorded by American country music artist Johnny Cash for his 1985 studio album Rainbow. The song was later recorded by American country music artist Tanya Tucker in 1987. The song was released in July of that year as the first single and title track from Tucker's album Love Me Like You Used To. The song reached number two on the Billboard Hot Country Singles chart.

== Charts ==
=== Weekly charts ===
Chart (1987)	Peak position
US Hot Country Songs (Billboard)	2
Canadian RPM Country Tracks	3

=== Year-end charts ===
Chart (1987)	Position
US Hot Country Songs (Billboard)	19
