= Can I See You Tonight =

Single by Tanya Tucker

from the album Dreamlovers
- B-side: "Let Me Count the Ways"
- Released: December 1980
- Genre: Country
- Length: 2:51
- Label: MCA
- Songwriter(s): Deborah Allen, Rafe Van Hoy
- Producer(s): Jerry Crutchfield

Tanya Tucker singles chronology
| "Dream Lover" (1980) | "Can I See You Tonight" (1980) | "Love Knows We Tried" (1981) |

"Can I See You Tonight" is a song written by Deborah Allen and Rafe Van Hoy. The song was first recorded by Jewel Blanch for RCA Records in 1979, reaching No. 33 on the Hot Country Songs charts.

It was later recorded by American country music artist Tanya Tucker, and was released in December 1980 as the second single from her album Dreamlovers. The song reached #4 on the Billboard Hot Country Singles & Tracks chart.

== Chart performance ==
| Chart (1980–1981) | Peak position |
|---|---|
| US Hot Country Songs (Billboard) | 4 |
| Canadian RPM Country Tracks | 4 |
