= All the Fun =

Single by Paul Overstreet

from the album Sowin' Love
- B-side: "Homemaker"
- Released: July 1989
- Genre: Country
- Length: 4:05 (album version); 3:32 (radio edit)
- Label: RCA Nashville
- Songwriters: Paul Overstreet; Taylor Dunn
- Producer: James Stroud

Paul Overstreet singles chronology
"Sowin' Love" (1989)	"All the Fun" (1989)	"Seein' My Father in Me" (1990)

"All the Fun" is a song co-written and recorded by American country music artist Paul Overstreet. It was released in July 1989 as the third single from his album Sowin' Love. The song reached #5 on the Billboard Hot Country Singles & Tracks chart in November 1989. It was written by Overstreet and Taylor Dunn.

== Chart performance ==
Chart (1989)	Peak position
Canada Country Singles (RPM)	10
US Hot Country Songs (Billboard)	5

=== Year-end charts ===
Chart (1989)	Position
US Country Songs (Billboard)	81
