= Daddy's Come Around =

Single by Paul Overstreet

from the album Heroes
- B-side: "Calm at the Center of My Storm"
- Released: November 1990
- Genre: Country
- Length: 3:34
- Label: RCA Nashville
- Songwriters: Paul Overstreet; Don Schlitz
- Producers: Brown Bannister; Paul Overstreet

Paul Overstreet singles chronology
"Richest Man on Earth" (1990)	"Daddy's Come Around" (1990)	"Heroes" (1991)

"Daddy's Come Around" is a song co-written and recorded by American country music artist Paul Overstreet. It was released in November 1990 as the first single from the album Heroes. The song was Overstreet's only number one country hit as a solo artist. The single went to number one for one week and spent a total of 18 weeks on the country chart. It was written by Overstreet and Don Schlitz.

== Background ==
"Daddy's Come Around" continued to play on the themes of positive, Christian-oriented messages that Overstreet's songs had come to be known for.

== Content ==
The song is told from the perspective of a little boy who recalls his father's wild living and how he used to spend his evenings out with friends, instead of at home helping to take care of his children and household, turning these duties completely over to his wife. The boy recalls how Mama, finally having lost her patience with her husband, has the locks changed and meets Daddy at the door. She then explains matters and gives him an ultimatum (Mama said more than the locks have changed/There's a new set of rules to this old game).

"Daddy" takes the hint and changes his ways, coming home at the end of the workday and offering to help with household chores, among other things. By the song's end, the man—the morning after having been overheard telling his wife, "I love you so"—learns he's going to be a father again.

== Chart performance ==
Chart (1990–1991)	Peak position
Canada Country Singles (RPM)	2
US Hot Country Songs (Billboard)	1

=== Year-end charts ===
Chart (1991)	Position
Canada Country Tracks (RPM)	34
US Country Songs (Billboard)	12
