= Sowin' Love (song) =

Single by Paul Overstreet

from the album Sowin' Love
- B-side: "Love Helps Those"
- Released: March 1989
- Genre: Country
- Length: 3:50
- Label: RCA Nashville
- Songwriters: Paul Overstreet; Don Schlitz
- Producer: James Stroud

Paul Overstreet singles chronology
"Love Helps Those" (1988)	"Sowin' Love" (1989)	"All the Fun" (1989)

"Sowin' Love" is a song co-written and recorded by American country music artist Paul Overstreet. It was released in March 1989 as the second single and title track from his album Sowin' Love. The song reached #9 on the Billboard Hot Country Singles & Tracks chart in June 1989. It was written by Overstreet and Don Schlitz.

== Chart performance ==
Chart (1989)	Peak position
Canada Country Singles (RPM)	41
US Hot Country Songs (Billboard)	9
