= Ball and Chain (Paul Overstreet song) =

Single by Paul Overstreet

from the album Heroes
- B-side: "Love Lives On"
- Released: June 24, 1991
- Genre: Country
- Length: 3:38
- Label: RCA Nashville
- Songwriters: Paul Overstreet; Don Schlitz
- Producers: Brown Bannister; Paul Overstreet

Paul Overstreet singles chronology
"Heroes" (1991)	"Ball and Chain" (1991)	"If I Could Bottle This Up" (1991)

"Ball and Chain" is a song co-written and recorded by American country music artist Paul Overstreet. It was released in June 1991 as the third single from his album Heroes. The song reached #5 on the Billboard Hot Country Singles & Tracks chart in October 1991. It was written by Overstreet and Don Schlitz.

== Chart performance ==
Chart (1991)	Peak position
Canada Country Singles (RPM)	5
US Hot Country Songs (Billboard)	5

=== Year-end charts ===
Chart (1991)	Position
Canada Country Tracks (RPM)	72
US Country Songs (Billboard)	59
