= If I Could Bottle This Up =

Single by George Jones with Shelby Lynne

from the album Friends in High Places
- B-side: "I Always Get It Right with You"
- Released: September 3, 1988
- Recorded: March 3, 1988
- Genre: Country
- Length: 3:13
- Label: Epic
- Songwriters: Paul Overstreet, Dean Dillon
- Producer: Billy Sherrill

George Jones singles chronology
"The Old Man No One Loves" (1988)	"If I Could Bottle This Up" (1988)	"I'm a One Woman Man" (1988)

Shelby Lynne singles chronology
"If I Could Bottle This Up" (1988)	"Under Your Spell Again" (1989)

"If I Could Bottle This Up" is a song written by Paul Overstreet and Dean Dillon. It was recorded as a duet by country singers George Jones and Shelby Lynne and released as a single in September 1988, peaking at #43. It was Lynne's first single release and she would follow it with her debut LP Sunrise, which Billy Sherrill would also produce. The song would later surface on the Jones duet compilation Friends in High Places in 1991.

== George Jones version ==
=== Chart performance ===
Chart (1988)	Peak position
US Hot Country Songs (Billboard)	43

== Paul Overstreet version ==
"If I Could Bottle This Up"

Single by Paul Overstreet

from the album Heroes
- B-side: "The Mountains Disappear"
- Released: November 23, 1991
- Genre: Country
- Length: 3:49
- Label: RCA Nashville
- Songwriters: Paul Overstreet, Dean Dillon
- Producers: Brown Bannister, Paul Overstreet

Paul Overstreet singles chronology
"Ball and Chain" (1991)	"If I Could Bottle This Up" (1991)	"Billy Can't Read" (1992)

Overstreet released his own version of the song in November 1991 as the fourth single from his album Heroes. The song reached #30 on the Billboard Hot Country Singles & Tracks chart.

=== Chart performance ===
Chart (1991–1992)	Peak position
US Hot Country Songs (Billboard)	30
Canadian RPM Country Tracks	33
