= Richest Man on Earth =

Single by Paul Overstreet

from the album Sowin' Love
- B-side: "Neath the Light of Your Love"
- Released: April 1990
- Genre: Country
- Length: 3:11
- Label: RCA Nashville
- Songwriters: Paul Overstreet; Don Schlitz
- Producer: James Stroud

Paul Overstreet singles chronology
| "Seein' My Father in Me" (1990) | "Richest Man on Earth" (1990) | "Daddy's Come Around" (1990) |

"Richest Man on Earth" is a song co-written and recorded by American country music artist Paul Overstreet. It was released in April 1990 as the fifth single from his 1989 album Sowin' Love. The song reached No. 3 on the Billboard Hot Country Singles & Tracks chart in August 1990. It was written by Overstreet and Don Schlitz, with A.R. Danes.

== Chart performance ==
| Chart (1990) | Peak position |
|---|---|
| Canada Country Singles (RPM) | 4 |
| US Hot Country Songs (Billboard) | 3 |

=== Year-end charts ===
| Chart (1990) | Position |
|---|---|
| Canada Country Tracks (RPM) | 53 |
| US Country Songs (Billboard) | 71 |
