= One Love at a Time =

Single by Tanya Tucker

from the album Girls Like Me
- B-side: "Fool, Fool Heart"
- Released: February 15, 1986
- Genre: Country
- Length: 2:54
- Label: Capitol Nashville
- Songwriter(s): Paul Davis, Paul Overstreet
- Producer(s): Jerry Crutchfield

Tanya Tucker singles chronology
"Baby I'm Yours" (1983)	"One Love at a Time" (1986)	"Just Another Love" (1986)

"One Love at a Time" is a song written by Paul Davis and Paul Overstreet, and recorded by American country music artist Tanya Tucker. It was released in February 1986 as the first single from the album Girls Like Me. The song reached #3 on the Billboard Hot Country Singles & Tracks chart.

== Chart performance ==
Chart (1986)	Peak position
US Hot Country Songs (Billboard)	3
Canadian RPM Country Tracks	1
