= I Won't Take Less Than Your Love =

Single by Tanya Tucker with Paul Davis and Paul Overstreet

from the album Love Me Like You Used To
- B-side: "Heartbreaker"
- Released: October 1987
- Genre: Country
- Length: 3:40
- Label: Capitol Nashville
- Songwriter(s): Paul Overstreet; Don Schlitz
- Producer(s): Jerry Crutchfield

Tanya Tucker singles chronology
"Love Me Like You Used To" (1987)	"I Won't Take Less Than Your Love" (1987)	"If It Don't Come Easy" (1988)

Paul Davis singles chronology
"You're Still New to Me" (1986)	"I Won't Take Less Than Your Love" (1987)	"Sweet Life" (1988)

Paul Overstreet singles chronology
"I Won't Take Less Than Your Love" (1987)	"Love Helps Those" (1988)

"I Won't Take Less Than Your Love" is a song written by Paul Overstreet and Don Schlitz, and recorded by American country music artist Tanya Tucker with Paul Davis & Overstreet. It was released in October 1987 as the second single from the album Love Me Like You Used To. The single reached number one for the week of February 27, 1988, and spent fifteen weeks on the country chart.

== Content ==
The song showcases three examples of servitude and gratitude, and the receiver—a man devoted to his wife, a grateful son, and a Christian deeply committed to serving God—seeking a way to repay the giver. Each one responds with the song's title line, the lesson being that love is worth more than all of the riches, comforts and treasures of the world.

The first verse (about the married couple) was sung by Davis, the second verse (about the mother-son relationship) by Tucker, and the final verse (the Christian) by Overstreet.

== Charts ==
=== Weekly charts ===
Chart (1987–1988)	Peak position
US Hot Country Songs (Billboard)	1
Canadian RPM Country Tracks	10

=== Year-end charts ===
Chart (1988)	Position
US Hot Country Songs (Billboard)	29
