= Don Schlitz =

American country singer-songwriter (1952–2026)

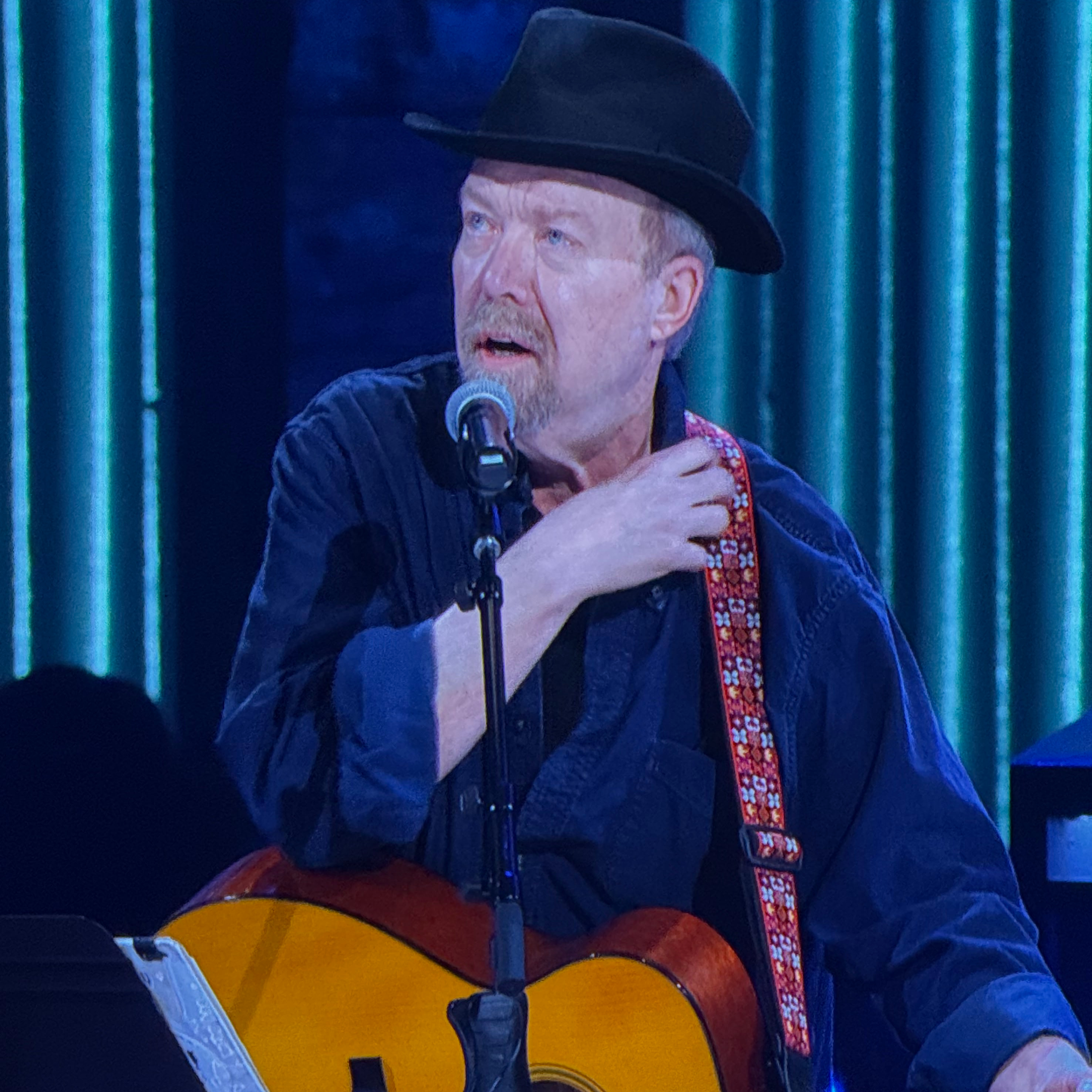
- Schlitz in 2025

Background information
- Born: Donald Alan Schlitz Jr. August 29, 1952; Durham, North Carolina, U.S.
- Died: April 16, 2026 (aged 73) Nashville, Tennessee, U.S.
- Genres: Country
- Occupation: Singer-songwriter
- Instruments: Harmonica, guitar, bass, vocals
- Years active: 1978–2026

Donald Allen Schlitz Jr. (August 29, 1952 – April 16, 2026) was an American songwriter who wrote more than twenty number-one hits on the country music charts. He was best known for his song "The Gambler" (Kenny Rogers), and as the co-writer of "Forever and Ever, Amen" (Randy Travis), and "When You Say Nothing at All" (Keith Whitley and Alison Krauss & Union Station). For his songwriting efforts, Schlitz earned two Grammy Awards, and four ASCAP Country Songwriter of the Year awards.

Schlitz was inducted in to four different halls of fame, namely the national Songwriters Hall of Fame, the Nashville Songwriters Hall of Fame, the Country Music Hall of Fame, and the North Carolina Music Hall of Fame. On August 30, 2022, he was inducted as a member of the Grand Ole Opry.

== Songwriting career ==
Schlitz's first hit as a songwriter was Kenny Rogers's "The Gambler", which became a crossover country hit upon its release in 1978, later becoming one of Rogers's signature songs. In 2018, the song was selected for preservation in the National Recording Registry by the Library of Congress as being "culturally, historically, or aesthetically significant". Thereafter, Schlitz wrote numerous country songs and penned several hits for other country artists. Among his biggest hits are two Number One songs, which he co-wrote with Paul Overstreet, "Forever and Ever, Amen" by Randy Travis, and "When You Say Nothing at All" by Keith Whitley. He had 24 number-one hits on the Country Charts.

United States President George H. W. Bush also commissioned Schlitz to write a theme song for his "Points of Light" program. This song, "Point of Light", was a No. 3 country hit for Randy Travis in 1991.

Schlitz also worked with Kenny Rogers again in 1998. Rogers joked at the time that "... every 20 years I will record a Don Schlitz song." The result was a baseball-themed hit single called "The Greatest". Rogers also recorded several more of his songs in 2013 for his best-selling You Can't Make Old Friends album.

He composed the music for the 2001 musical The Adventures of Tom Sawyer.

== Death ==
On April 16, 2026, Schlitz died at a hospital in Nashville, Tennessee, following a sudden illness. He was 73.

== Recordings ==
In addition to writing for other artists, Schlitz recorded three albums. The first, titled Dreamers' Matinee, was released in 1980 on Capitol Records. A live compilation, titled Live at the Bluebird Café, was released in 2001. In 2010, Schlitz released another studio album of new material, Allergic to Crazy.

== Singles ==
Year	Title	US Country
1978	"The Gambler"	65
1979	"You're the One Who Rewrote My Life Story"	91

== Singles co-written by Don Schlitz ==
Singles written or co-written by Don Schlitz include the following. Asterisks denote songs that reached Number One on the U.S. Billboard country charts.

- "40 Hour Week (For a Livin')" by Alabama*
- "Almost Goodbye" by Mark Chesnutt*
- "And So It Goes" by Nitty Gritty Dirt Band with John Denver
- "Ball and Chain" by Paul Overstreet
- "The Battle Hymn of Love" by Kathy Mattea and Tim O'Brien
- "The Center of My Universe" by The Bellamy Brothers
- "Cheatin'" by Sara Evans
- "Crazy from the Heart" by The Bellamy Brothers
- "Crying Shame" by Michael Johnson
- "Daddy's Come Around" by Paul Overstreet*
- "Deeper Than the Holler" by Randy Travis*
- "Didn't We Shine" by Waylon Jennings
- "Forever and Ever, Amen" by Randy Travis*
- "The Gambler" by Kenny Rogers*
- "Give Me Wings" by Michael Johnson*
- "Good as I Was to You" by Lorrie Morgan
- "The Greatest" by Kenny Rogers
- "Guardian Angels" by The Judds
- "He Thinks He'll Keep Her" by Mary Chapin Carpenter
- "Heart of the Matter" by The Kendalls (1980), Loretta Lynn (1983)
- "Heroes and Friends" by Randy Travis
- "Houston Solution" by Ronnie Milsap
- "I Could Be Persuaded" by The Bellamy Brothers
- "I Feel Lucky" by Mary Chapin Carpenter
- "I Know Where I'm Going" by The Judds*
- "I Take My Chances" by Mary Chapin Carpenter
- "I Think About It All the Time" by John Berry
- "I Think About You" by Collin Raye
- "I Watched It All (On My Radio)" by Lionel Cartwright
- "I Won't Take Less Than Your Love" by Tanya Tucker with Paul Overstreet and Paul Davis*
- "If I Could Bottle This Up" by Paul Overstreet
- "If I Never See Midnight Again" by Sweethearts of the Rodeo
- "If You Can Do Anything Else" by George Strait
- "I'll Be Lovin' You" by Lee Greenwood
- "In Terms of Love" by SHeDAISY
- "Learning to Live Again" by Garth Brooks
- "Leaving's Not an Option" by Chris Cummings
- "Like Father Like Son" by Lionel Cartwright
- "Long Shot" by Baillie & the Boys
- "Looking for a Sign" by Chris Cummings
- "Loved Too Much" by Ty Herndon
- "Midnight Girl/Sunset Town" by Sweethearts of the Rodeo
- "My Arms Stay Open All Night" by Tanya Tucker
- "Not Too Much to Ask" by Mary Chapin Carpenter with Joe Diffie
- "Oh Heart" by Baillie & the Boys
- "Old School" by John Conlee
- "On the Other Hand" by Randy Travis*
- "One Promise Too Late" by Reba McEntire*
- "Point of Light" by Randy Travis
- "Richest Man on Earth" by Paul Overstreet
- "The River and the Highway" by Pam Tillis
- "Ready and Waiting" by Deborah Allen
- "Rockin' with the Rhythm of the Rain" by The Judds*
- "Satisfy You" by Sweethearts of the Rodeo
- "Say What's in Your Heart" by Restless Heart
- "Say Yes" by Dusty Drake
- "She Deserves You" by Baillie & the Boys
- "Sowin' Love" by Paul Overstreet
- "Stand a Little Rain" by Nitty Gritty Dirt Band
- "Strong Enough to Bend" by Tanya Tucker*
- "True Heart" by The Oak Ridge Boys
- "Turn It Loose" by The Judds*
- "When You Say Nothing at All" by Keith Whitley* (later covered by Alison Krauss & Union Station and Ronan Keating. Keating's version was in the film Notting Hill, and made it to number one on the British charts.)
- "Why They Call It Falling" by Lee Ann Womack
- "You Again" by The Forester Sisters*
- "You'll Never Be Sorry" by The Bellamy Brothers

== Awards ==
- 1979: Country Music Association – Song of the Year ("The Gambler")
- 1979: Grammy – Country Song of the Year ("The Gambler")
- 1986: Country Music Association – Song of the Year ("On the Other Hand")
- 1986: Academy of Country Music – Song of the Year ("On the Other Hand")
- 1986: Nashville Songwriters Association International – Song of the Year ("On the Other Hand")
- 1987: Country Music Association – Song of the Year ("Forever and Ever, Amen")
- 1988: Grammy – Country Song of the Year ("Forever and Ever, Amen")
- 1988–1991: ASCAP – Country Songwriter of the Year
- 2010: Inducted into the North Carolina Music Hall of Fame.
- 2017: Inducted into the Country Music Hall of Fame
