= Paul Overstreet =

American country music singer-songwriter

- Born: Paul Lester Overstreet; March 17, 1955 (age 71); Vancleave, Mississippi, U.S.
- Origin: Newton, Mississippi, U.S.
- Genres: Country, Christian
- Occupations: Singer, songwriter
- Instruments: Vocals, guitar
- Years active: 1982–present
- Labels: MTM; RCA Nashville; Scarlet Moon
- Formerly of: S-K-O
- Website: http://www.pauloverstreet.com

Paul Lester Overstreet (born March 17, 1955) is an American country music singer and songwriter. He began his singing career in 1982 with a self-titled album on RCA Records Nashville. From 1986 to 1987, he was a vocalist in the trio S-K-O (Schuyler, Knobloch & Overstreet), in which he had a number-one single on the Billboard Hot Country Songs charts with "Baby's Got a New Baby". After leaving S-K-O he resumed a solo career, charting a second number-one single alongside Paul Davis and Tanya Tucker on "I Won't Take Less Than Your Love". Between 1989 and 1992, he released the albums Sowin' Love, Heroes, and Love Is Strong. These albums include the number-one single "Daddy's Come Around" and nine other top-40 entries on the country music charts. Subsequent albums have been released independently on the Scarlet Moon label.

As a songwriter, Overstreet had his first major success in 1982 with "Same Ole Me" by George Jones featuring the Oak Ridge Boys. Overstreet has also written multiple singles for Randy Travis including "On the Other Hand", "Diggin' Up Bones", "Forever and Ever, Amen", and "Deeper Than the Holler". Other acts who have recorded Overstreet's songs include the Judds, Keith Whitley, and Blake Shelton. Overstreet's sons, Nash and Chord, are also musicians. Nash is the lead guitarist for the pop band Hot Chelle Rae, while Chord played Sam Evans on Glee and signed with Island Records in 2016.

Overstreet was inducted into the Country Music Hall of Fame in 2026.

== Early life ==
Overstreet was born on March 17, 1955, in Vancleave, Mississippi, the son of Mary Lela (Havens) Hatten and William E. Overstreet, a minister, and was raised in Newton.

== Career ==
=== Songwriter ===
During his songwriting career, primarily in the country genre, Overstreet has written or co-written 27 Top Ten songs. During this time, he has won two Grammy Awards and also won ACM and CMA Song of the Year Awards (1987 and 1988). Overstreet was named the BMI Songwriter of the Year five straight years, from 1987 to 1991, an achievement on music row that has not been achieved before or since. He co-wrote "A Long Line of Love", "Love Can Build a Bridge", and "Forever and Ever, Amen". Other well-known hits of recent years he is known for are "She Thinks My Tractor's Sexy" by Kenny Chesney and "Some Beach" by Blake Shelton, which was a Number One hit in 2004.

Overstreet is best known for writing country songs such as "Forever and Ever, Amen" and "On the Other Hand", both of which were Number Ones for Randy Travis. He also co-wrote "When You Say Nothing at All" which was a Number One hit at the end of 1988 for Keith Whitley, and later a Top Five hit in 1995 for Alison Krauss, and revived later in 1999 by Ronan Keating of Boyzone. He is also known for writing the worship song God Is Good All The Time with Don Moen, which has become one of Moen's signature songs. Overstreet has written multiple songs for new country singer Zach Top

=== Singer ===
Overstreet was first signed as a singer in 1982. His debut single, "Beautiful Baby", peaked at No. 76 on the country charts that year, and was the first single from his self-titled debut album. After co-writing Tanya Tucker's 1987 single "I Won't Take Less Than Your Love" with Don Schlitz, Overstreet and fellow singer-songwriter Paul Davis became guest vocalists on the song, which became a Number One hit that year.

Also in 1987, Overstreet founded the trio S-K-O (also known as Schuyler, Knobloch & Overstreet) with Thom Schuyler and J. Fred Knobloch, both former solo singers. S-K-O charted three singles with Overstreet as a member, including the Number One "Baby's Got a New Baby". After one album the trio was renamed S-K-B when Overstreet left and was replaced by Craig Bickhardt.

In 1988, Overstreet signed to RCA Nashville as a solo artist. His second solo album, Sowin' Love, accounted for five straight Top 10 hits on the country charts: "Love Helps Those", the title track, "All the Fun", "Seein' My Father in Me" and "Richest Man on Earth." His second album, 1990's Heroes, produced his only solo Number One in its lead-off single "Daddy's Come Around", which was followed by the Top Tens "Heroes" and "Ball and Chain". However, his chart success soon waned, with "If I Could Bottle This Up" peaking at No. 30 and "Billy Can't Read" falling short of Top 40. A third RCA album, Love Is Strong, produced the No. 22 "Me and My Baby" and two more singles which missed the Top 40. Also, the song "There But for the Grace of God Go I" won a Dove Award for Country Recorded Song of the Year at the 24th GMA Dove Awards in 1993. Three years later, Overstreet released his first album for Scarlet Moon Records, Time. It produced his last single to enter the country charts, "We've Got to Keep on Meeting Like This," which peaked at No. 73.

In 2013, Overstreet starred in a TV pilot titled Nashville Unplugged Live taped in Las Vegas and produced and directed by Michael A. Bloom. Also starring with Overstreet was songwriter Danny Myrick.

== Discography ==
Studio albums

- Paul Overstreet (1982)
- Sowin' Love (1989)
- Heroes (1991)
- Love Is Strong (1992)
- Time (1996)
- A Songwriter's Project, Volume 1 (1999)
- Living by the Book (2001)
- Christmas: My Favorite Time of the Year (2001)
- Forever and Ever, Amen (2005)
- Something for the Road (2008)
- My Favorite Demos Volume I (2010)
- My Favorite Demos Volume II (2010)
- Somewhere in the Caribbean (2018)
