= You've Got to Be Carefully Taught =

Song
- Published: 1949
- Genre: Showtune
- Composer: Richard Rodgers
- Lyricist: Oscar Hammerstein II

"You've Got to Be Carefully Taught" (sometimes "You've Got to Be Taught" or "Carefully Taught") is a show tune from the 1949 Rodgers and Hammerstein musical South Pacific.

South Pacific received scrutiny for its commentary regarding relationships between different races and ethnic groups. In particular, "You’ve Got to Be Carefully Taught" was subject to widespread criticism, judged by some to be too controversial or downright inappropriate for the musical stage. Sung by the character Lieutenant Cable, the song is preceded by a line saying racism is "not born in you! It happens after you’re born..."

Rodgers and Hammerstein risked the entire South Pacific venture to include the song in the production. After the show's debut, it faced legislative challenges regarding its decency and supposed Communist agenda. While the show was on a tour of the Southern United States, lawmakers in Georgia introduced a bill outlawing entertainment containing "an underlying philosophy inspired by Moscow." One legislator said that "a song justifying interracial marriage was implicitly a threat to the American way of life." Rodgers and Hammerstein defended their work resolutely. James Michener, upon whose stories South Pacific was based, recalled, "The authors replied stubbornly that this number represented why they had wanted to do this play, and that even if it meant the failure of the production, it was going to stay in."

== Cover versions ==
The song has been covered by various artists, including: Michael Johnson, on his 1973 debut album There Is a Breeze; Iain Matthews, on his 1979 LP Stealin' Home; Barbra Streisand, on her Live in Concert 2006 album; John Pizzarelli, on his 2008 album With a Song in My Heart; by Billy Porter on his 2017 album The Soul of Richard Rodgers; and James Taylor, on his 2020 album American Standard.

Musical theatre veteran Alvin Ing performed the song in his final public performance before his death in 2021, as a way to protest the increased violence against Asian Americans during the COVID-19 pandemic.

== In popular culture ==
"You've Got to Be Carefully Taught" is referenced lyrically in the song "My Shot" from the musical Hamilton by Lin-Manuel Miranda, with South Pacific being directly credited.

== Bibliography ==
- Andrea Most, "‘You’ve Got to Be Carefully Taught’: The Politics of Race in Rodgers and Hammerstein’s South Pacific", Theatre Journal 52, no. 3 (October 2000), 306.
