= You Can Call Me Blue =

Studio album by Michael Johnson
- Released: 1980
- Recorded: 1980
- Genre: Soft rock; country rock
- Label: EMI America
- Producer: Steve Gibson; Brent Maher

Michael Johnson chronology
Dialogue (1979)	You Can Call Me Blue (1980)	Home Free (1981)

Singles from You Can Call Me Blue
- 1. "You Can Call Me Blue" Released: 1980

Professional ratings
Review scores
Source	Rating
AllMusic	4.5/5 stars

You Can Call Me Blue is the sixth album by Michael Johnson, released in 1980 on EMI America Records.

The album bubbled under the Billboard Top LPs chart, peaking at No. 203. The title track was released as the only single from the album. It was Johnson's final entry on the Billboard Hot 100, peaking at No. 86. However, it was a top 40 hit on the Adult Contemporary chart, peaking at No. 34.

== Track listing ==
Side A
No.	Title	Writer(s)	Length
1.	"You Can Call Me Blue"	David Morgan, Larry Brown	3:20
2.	"After You"	Andy Goldmark	3:42
3.	"Savin' It Up"	Randy Goodrum	3:24
4.	"You, You, You"	Dean Pitchford, Tom Snow	2:42
5.	"Blame It On The Rain"	Eric Kaz, Tom Snow	3:34

Side B
No.	Title	Writer(s)	Length
6.	"Right Through The Heart"	Robert Byrne	3:56
7.	"Don't Ask Why"	Bill LaBounty, Roy Freeland	3:07
8.	"Staying With It"	John Lewis Parker, Tom Snow	2:36
9.	"You Sure Fooled Me"	Tom Snow	3:15
10.	"Empty Hearts"	Michael McDonald	3:34

== Charts ==
Chart (1980)	Peak position
Billboard Bubbling Under the Top LPs	203
