= Ponies (song) =

Single by Michael Johnson

from the album Wings
- B-side: "Cool Me in the River of Love"
- Released: June 13, 1987
- Genre: Country
- Length: 4:06
- Label: RCA
- Songwriter: Jeffrey Bullock
- Producer: Brent Maher

Michael Johnson singles chronology
| "The Moon Is Still Over Her Shoulder" (1987) | "Ponies" (1987) | "Crying Shame" (1987) |

"Ponies" is a song recorded by American country pop artist Michael Johnson. It was released in June 1987 as the fourth single from the album Wings. The song reached #26 on the Billboard Hot Country Singles & Tracks chart. The song was written by Jeffrey Bullock.

== Chart performance ==
| Chart (1987) | Peak position |
|---|---|
| US Hot Country Songs (Billboard) | 26 |
