= The Michael Johnson Album =

Studio album by Michael Johnson
- Released: 1978
- Recorded: 1978
- Studio: Creative Workshop (Berry Hill, Tennessee)
- Genre: Soft rock
- Label: EMI America
- Producer: Michael Johnson, Steve Gibson, Brent Maher

Michael Johnson chronology
Ain't Dis Da Life (1977)	The Michael Johnson Album (1978)	Dialogue (1979)

Singles from The Michael Johnson Album
- 1. "Bluer Than Blue" Released: April 1978; 2. "Almost Like Being in Love" Released: August 1978

Professional ratings
Review scores
Source	Rating
AllMusic	3/5 stars

The Michael Johnson Album is the fourth studio album by American singer and songwriter Michael Johnson. It was released in 1978 on EMI.

Two singles were released from the album. "Bluer Than Blue" became the singer's first top 40 hit, reaching No. 12 on the Billboard Hot 100 chart in summer 1978. It also reached No. 10 on the Cash Box chart. "Almost Like Being in Love" became a top 10 Adult Contemporary hit in both the U.S. (no. 4) and Canada (no. 10).

== Track listing ==
Side A
No.	Title	Writer(s)	Length
1.	"Sailing Without a Sail"	Bill LaBounty, Roy Freeland	3:47
2.	"Foolish"	Tom Snow	2:47
3.	"Dancin' Tonight"	Bill LaBounty, Michael Johnson	2:52
4.	"Two in Love"	Mark Henley	2:53
5.	"Ridin' in the Sky"	Crow Johnson	3:10

Side B
No.	Title	Writer(s)	Length
6.	"Bluer Than Blue"	Randy Goodrum	2:54
7.	"Almost Like Being in Love"	Alan Jay Lerner, Frederick Loewe	3:25
8.	"25 Words Or Less"	Bill LaBounty, Roy Freeland	2:57
9.	"Gypsy Woman"	Curtis Mayfield	3:45
10.	"When You Come Home"	Eric Kaz, Tom Snow	3:11

== Personnel ==
- Michael Johnson - vocals, classical guitar on "Ridin' in the Sky" and "Gypsy Woman"
- Steve Gibson, Jon Goin - guitar
- Mike Leech, Jack Williams, Norbert Putnam - bass
- Shane Keister - piano, electric piano, Moog and ARP synthesizer
- Bobby Ogdin - organ, electric piano, Orgatron
- Bill LaBounty - piano, electric piano
- Kenny Malone - drums
- Farrell Morris - percussion
- Sheri Kramer, Diane Tidwell, Lisa Silver - backing vocals
- Roger Williams - saxophone
- Buddy Skipper - arrangements, saxophone
- Bergen White - arrangements
- Buddy Skipper, Don Sheffield, Roger Bissell - horns
- The Shelly Kurland Strings - strings on "When You Come Home"

Technical

- Brent Maher, Rich Schirmer - recording
- John Kosh - art direction, design
- James M. Shea - photography

== Charts ==
Chart (1978)	Peak position
US Billboard Top LPs	81
Canada RPM Top Albums	83
