= The Moon Is Still Over Her Shoulder =

Single by Michael Johnson

from the album Wings
- B-side: "That's What Your Love Does to Me"
- Released: January 31, 1987
- Genre: Country
- Length: 3:55
- Label: RCA
- Songwriter(s): Hugh Prestwood
- Producer(s): Brent Maher

Michael Johnson singles chronology
"Give Me Wings" (1986)	"The Moon Is Still Over Her Shoulder" (1987)	"Ponies" (1987)

"The Moon Is Still Over Her Shoulder" is a song written by Hugh Prestwood, and recorded by American country pop artist Michael Johnson. It was released in January 1987 as the third single from the album Wings. The song was Johnson's second and last number one on the country chart and his follow up to "Give Me Wings". The single went to number one for one week and spent a total of fifteen weeks on the country chart.

== Charts ==
=== Weekly charts ===
Chart (1987)	Peak position
US Hot Country Songs (Billboard)	1
Canadian RPM Country Tracks	2

=== Year-end charts ===
Chart (1987)	Position
US Hot Country Songs (Billboard)	5
