= There Is Nothing Like a Dame =

Single by Danny Kaye
- B-side: "Honey Bun"
- Published: 1949
- Released: May 1949
- Recorded: April 18, 1949
- Genre: Traditional pop
- Length: 3:09
- Label: Decca
- Composer: Richard Rodgers
- Lyricist: Oscar Hammerstein II

"There Is Nothing Like a Dame" (for 4 part male voices, 2 tenors and 2 basses) is one of the songs from the 1949 musical South Pacific. The song was written by Richard Rodgers with lyrics by Oscar Hammerstein II. It is widely popular in the musical arts, often sung by men's choirs.

It is sung by the sailors (e.g. Sven Larsen) because they all long for women in their lives. The song is broken up in the middle when the nurses run by, and Billis gives Nurse Nellie Forbush her laundry. The song also has a sung recitative between the verses and the Chorus.

A comic version of this song was performed in the 1977 Christmas edition of the BBC's Morecambe and Wise Show, as well as being performed in another Morecambe and Wise Show — one of their shows featured Cliff Richard in the song. The parts of the sailors were all played by BBC newsreaders of the time with Peter Woods getting to sing the distinctive last line.

Another comic version of the song was performed on The Goodies episode "For Those in Peril on the Sea".

This song was covered by Californian ska punk band Reel Big Fish for their 1997 7" single Vacationing in Palm Springs. Instrumental version was recorded on March 22, 1962, for the eponym LP with Pete Candoli and Conte Candoli on trumpets, Shelly Manne on drums, John Williams on piano, Howard Roberts on guitar and Gary Peacock on bass.

It was also used as the signature tune for ITV's series The Dame Edna Treatment.
