= Bluer Than Blue =

1978 song by Michael Johnson

Single by Michael Johnson

from the album The Michael Johnson Album
- B-side: "Two in Love"
- Released: April 1978
- Studio: Creative Workshop (Berry Hill, Tennessee)
- Genre: Soft rock
- Length: 2:59
- Label: EMI America
- Songwriter: Randy Goodrum
- Producers: Steve Gibson; Brent Maher

Michael Johnson singles chronology
"On the Road" (1973)	"Bluer Than Blue" (1978)	"Almost Like Being in Love" (1978)

"Bluer Than Blue" is a 1978 song recorded by Michael Johnson. The song was written by noted pop and country songwriter Randy Goodrum. Originally recorded as a demo, "Bluer Than Blue" was taken as the first single from Johnson's subsequent LP, The Michael Johnson Album. The song is from the point of view of a man who is in a failing relationship, and is trying to convince himself that his situation will improve once the one he loved moves on; however, it is evident by the lyrics to the song his efforts are thus far ineffective.

The song became the singer's first top 40 hit, reaching #12 on the Billboard Hot 100 chart in summer 1978. It also reached #10 on the Cash Box chart. It proved even more popular with adult contemporary radio stations, spending three weeks at #1 on the Easy Listening chart that same year. This was Johnson's highest-charting single on the Pop and Adult Contemporary charts. The song has become a well-known American 1970s soft rock single that continues to be played on radio stations.

The single received generally favourable reviews at the time of its release. Cashbox Magazine described Johnson's work as "full of touching ballads with all the right production touches, subtle instrumentation and poignant vocals necessary to keep the tenderness from becoming insipid." In 1978, Johnson was quoted as saying, "I knew it was potentially a successful song but I didn't think it would go this far. It seemed, well, too mature. The experience of being married or living with someone is hard to identify with for younger people."

The music video for the Michael Johnson version of "Bluer Than Blue" was one of the first music videos played on the MTV cable channel when it launched in 1981.

== Cover versions ==
- Singapore-born Anita Sarawak recorded this song in her album in 1979.
- Ruby Wilson recorded the song, which was later included in her 1981 album Ruby Wilson.
- Filipina singer Regine Velasquez recorded the song and was later included in her 1996 cover album Retro.
- In 1996, Barry Manilow covered the song on his album Summer of '78.
- Joel Palencia covered the song in early 2015.
- Nanci Griffith covered the song for her "Ruby's Torch" album.

== Chart performance ==
=== Weekly singles charts ===
Chart (1978)	Peak position
Canadian RPM Top Singles	6
Canadian RPM Adult Contemporary	1
New Zealand (RIANZ)	24
US Billboard Hot 100	12
US Cash Box Top 100	10
US Billboard Adult Contemporary	1

=== Year-end charts ===
Chart (1978)	Rank
US Billboard Hot 100	81
US Cash Box	78
Canada RPM Top Singles	47

== See also ==
- List of number-one adult contemporary singles of 1978 (U.S.)
