= I Will Whisper Your Name =

1988 single by Michael Johnson

Single by Michael Johnson

from the album That's That
- B-side: "Too Soon to Tell"
- Released: April 2, 1988
- Genre: Country
- Length: 3:34
- Label: RCA
- Songwriter(s): Randy VanWarmer
- Producer(s): Brent Maher

Michael Johnson singles chronology
| "Crying Shame" (1987) | "I Will Whisper Your Name" (1988) | "That's That" (1988) |

"I Will Whisper Your Name" is a song written by Randy VanWarmer, and recorded by American country pop artist Michael Johnson. It was released in April 1988 as the second single from the album That's That. The song reached #7 on the Billboard Hot Country Singles & Tracks chart.

== Charts ==
=== Weekly charts ===
| Chart (1988) | Peak position |
|---|---|
| US Hot Country Songs (Billboard) | 7 |
| Canadian RPM Country Tracks | 19 |

=== Year-end charts ===
| Chart (1988) | Position |
|---|---|
| US Hot Country Songs (Billboard) | 72 |
