= That's That (Michael Johnson song) =

Single by Michael Johnson

from the album That's That
- B-side: "Some People's Lives"
- Released: August 27, 1988
- Genre: Country
- Length: 4:07
- Label: RCA
- Songwriter(s): Hugh Prestwood
- Producer(s): Brent Maher

Michael Johnson singles chronology
| "I Will Whisper Your Name" (1988) | "That's That" (1988) | "Roller Coaster Run (Up Too Slow, Down Too Fast)" (1989) |

"That's That" is a song written by Hugh Prestwood, and recorded by American country pop artist Michael Johnson. It was released in August 1988 as the third single and title track from the album That's That. The song reached #9 on the Billboard Hot Country Singles & Tracks chart.

== Content ==
The song uses the title phrase to indicate the end of a relationship.

== Chart performance ==
| Chart (1988) | Peak position |
|---|---|
| US Hot Country Songs (Billboard) | 9 |
| Canadian RPM Country Tracks | 8 |
