= Crying Shame =

Single by Michael Johnson

from the album That's That
- B-side: "True Love"
- Released: October 17, 1987
- Genre: Country
- Length: 3:26
- Label: RCA
- Songwriters: Michael Johnson, Brent Maher, Don Schlitz
- Producer: Brent Maher

Michael Johnson singles chronology
"Ponies" (1987)	"Crying Shame" (1987)	"I Will Whisper Your Name" (1988)

"Crying Shame" is a song by American country pop artist Michael Johnson. It was released in October 1987 as the first single from the album That's That. The song reached #4 on the Billboard Hot Country Singles & Tracks chart. Johnson wrote the song with Brent Maher and Don Schlitz.

== Chart performance ==
Chart (1987–1988)	Peak position
US Hot Country Songs (Billboard)	4
Canadian RPM Country Tracks	8
