= Almost Like Being in Love =

Original show tune by Lerner and Loewe; from the 1947 musical "Brigadoon"

Song
- Published: 1947
- Composer: Frederick Loewe
- Lyricist: Alan Jay Lerner

"Almost Like Being in Love" is a show tune with music by Frederick Loewe and lyrics by Alan Jay Lerner. It was written for the score of their 1947 musical Brigadoon. The song was first sung by David Brooks and Marion Bell, in the Broadway production. It was later performed in the 1954 film version by Gene Kelly.

== Michael Johnson version ==
"Almost Like Being in Love"

Single by Michael Johnson

from the album The Michael Johnson Album
- B-side: "Ridin' in the Sky"
- Released: August 1978
- Genre: Pop
- Length: 3:25
- Label: EMI
- Composer: Frederick Loewe
- Lyricist: Alan Jay Lerner
- Producers: Brent Maher, Steve Gibson

Michael Johnson singles chronology
| "Bluer Than Blue" (1978) | "Almost Like Being in Love" (1978) | "This Night Won't Last Forever" (1979) |

"Almost Like Being in Love" was revived in a downbeat ballad version by singer Michael Johnson (U.S. no. 32, 1978). His rendition became a Top 10 Adult Contemporary hit in both the U.S. (no. 4) and Canada (no. 10).

| Chart (1978) | Peak position |
|---|---|
| Canadian RPM Top Singles | 40 |
| Canadian RPM Adult Contemporary | 10 |
| US Billboard Hot 100 | 32 |
| US Billboard Adult Contemporary | 4 |
| US Billboard R&B | 91 |
| US Cash Box Top 100 | 37 |

== Other versions ==
- There were three hit versions of the song in the United States in 1947: Frank Sinatra's version was the highest charting at no. 20. Mildred Bailey and Mary Martin both charted with the song at no. 21 that year.
- Nat King Cole recorded more than one version of the song, including a later version that was used as the closing song in the 1993 movie Groundhog Day starring Bill Murray. Cole's version, in the key of G major like the original, features a ii–V–I turnaround (2–5–1) in G, a pair of similar 2–5–1 sequences in E major and D major for the bridge, after which it raises the refrain a half-step with a 2–5–1 in A flat major.
- Frank Sinatra rerecorded the song for his 1961 album Come Swing with Me!.
- The song was also made popular by Shirley Bassey. Like Judy Garland, Bassey performed this song as a medley with the song, "This Can't Be Love".
- Bradley Walsh recorded his version of the song for his 2016 debut album Chasing Dreams.
- Red Garland recorded his version with Paul Chambers and Art Taylor on his 1957 album Red Garland's Piano.
- Ella Fitzgerald recorded a version with Dizzy Gillespie and his orchestra, released on her 1962 album, Ella Sings Broadway.
- Erroll Garner recorded a version of the song for his 1966 live album Campus Concert.
- Seth MacFarlane recorded his version of the song for his 2017 album In Full Swing.
- Diana Krall included the song in her 2020 album This Dream of You.
- Vic Damone recorded a version of the song in 1956.
- Melanie recorded her version of the song on her 1975 album, "Sunset and Other Beginnings"
- James Taylor included the song in the 2020 album American Standard.
- Rod Stewart with Jools Holland recorded a version on the 2024 album Swing Fever
- Bleachers (band) recorded a version for the soundtrack of The New Look, produced by Jack Antonoff.
