= Wings (Michael Johnson album) =

Studio album by Michael Johnson
- Released: 1986
- Studio: Creative Workshop (Berry Hill, Tennessee)
- Genre: Country
- Length: 35:31
- Label: RCA Records
- Producer: Brent Maher

Michael Johnson chronology
Lifetime Guarantee (1983)	Wings (1986)	That's That (1988)

Wings is the ninth studio album by American country pop singer Michael Johnson. It was released in 1986 via RCA Records. The album includes the singles "Gotta Learn to Love Without You", "Give Me Wings", The Moon Is Still Over Her Shoulder" and "Ponies".

== Track listing ==
No.	Title	Writer(s)	Length
1.	"Gotta Learn to Love Without You"	Michael Johnson, Kent Robbins	2:49
2.	"It's Only Over for You"	Mike Reid, Rory Bourke	3:32
3.	"That's What Your Love Does to Me"	Chick Rains, Bill Caswell	2:36
4.	"Give Me Wings"	Kye Fleming, Don Schlitz	3:37
5.	"Hangin' On"	Mickey Jupp, Chris East	3:31
6.	"Ponies"	Jeffrey Bullock	4:06
7.	"Magic Time"	Jamie O'Hara	4:33
8.	"True Love"	Gary Nicholson, Rains	3:37
9.	"Cool Me in the River of Love"	Dennis Linde	2:55
10.	"The Moon Is Still Over Her Shoulder"	Hugh Prestwood	3:53

== Chart performance ==
Chart (1986)	Peak position
US Top Country Albums (Billboard)	26
