= Give Me Wings =

Single by Michael Johnson

from the album Wings
- B-side: "Magic Time"
- Released: September 27, 1986
- Genre: Country
- Length: 3:39
- Label: RCA
- Songwriter(s): Kye Fleming; Don Schlitz
- Producer(s): Brent Maher

Michael Johnson singles chronology
"Gotta Learn to Love Without You" (1986)	"Give Me Wings" (1986)	"The Moon Is Still Over Her Shoulder" (1987)

"Give Me Wings" is a song written by Kye Fleming and Don Schlitz, and recorded by American country pop artist Michael Johnson. It was released in September 1986 as the second single from the album Wings. The song was Johnson's third country hit and was the first of two number one country singles. The single went to number one for one week and spent a total of sixteen weeks on the country chart.

== Charts ==
=== Weekly charts ===
Chart (1986–1987)	Peak position
US Hot Country Songs (Billboard)	1
Canadian RPM Country Tracks	3

=== Year-end charts ===
Chart (1987)	Position
US Hot Country Songs (Billboard)	1
