= Loretta Ables Sayre =

American actress and singer

- Born: Loretta Gail Ables; Stockton, California, U.S.
- Occupations: Actress, singer
- Spouse: David Sayre

Loretta Ables Sayre is an American actress and singer who performed jazz standards at luxury hotels in Hawaii for three decades. During her career, Ables Sayre performed in a few musicals and guest-starred in several television shows, also doing work in commercials. In her 2007 Broadway debut as Bloody Mary in South Pacific, she was nominated for a Tony Award for Best Featured Actress in a Musical and also won the 2008 Theatre World Award.

== Early life and career ==
Loretta Gail Ables was born in Stockton, California to a Filipino father and a mother of mixed Asian and European descent. She has an older sister and brother. Her father was 25 years older than her mother, and eventually the couple divorced. Her mother remarried, and Ables Sayre has two younger half-siblings. She was raised in Hawaii after her stepfather, who was in the United States Navy, was transferred there when Ables Sayre was six years old. She attended Pearl Harbor Elementary School, Aliamanu Intermediate, and Admiral Arthur W. Radford High School in Honolulu, participating in school plays and choirs. As a small child, inspired by her mother's Dinah Washington and Sarah Vaughan recordings, Ables Sayre already knew that she wanted to become a singer.

Ables Sayre began to build her singing career immediately after high school while working in hotel jobs. She soon became the opening singer for a hotel performer's act. In 1979, she sang with Hawaiian musicians Kapono and Keola Beamer on the local pop hit Honolulu City Lights and at the Reef Hotel in Waikiki. In 1981, she became the opening act for comedian Andy Bumatai at the Royal Hawaiian Hotel. She went on to perform Jazz and R&B standards at hotels, clubs and conventions throughout the Honolulu-Waikiki area.

In 1985, with Honolulu Theater for Youth, Ables Sayre appeared in Song for the Navigator, which toured Micronesia, Australia and throughout the U.S., including performances at the Kennedy Center in Washington, D.C. In 1989, she played Effie White in Tommy Aguilar's 1989 production of Dreamgirls at the Hawaii Theater. The same year, she became the featured vocalist at the Halekulani Hotel in Waikiki, where she performed for 10 years. She was voted "Favorite Female Vocalist" by the readers of Honolulu Magazine in 1993 in its "Best of the Best" issue.

== Television, commercials and recent years ==
Ables Sayre has appeared in various television series filmed on location in Hawaii. She guest starred in the detective series Magnum, P.I., played Parissima Macadangdang in The Byrds of Paradise, and had a recurring role, Aunty Jackson in Baywatch Hawaii. She was Nannie Lee in Hawaii (2004), appeared in North Shore (2004) and played the recurring role of Kai's Auntie in Beyond the Break (2006–2007). She lends her voice to PBS Hawaii and has had additional roles in various local TV shows. In commercials, she played waitress Loretta in the Bank of Hawaii series of commercials called "Harry and Myra" and commercials for State Farm, the Hawaii State Department of Health, Oceanic Time Warner and others. Her voice-over work includes commercials on radio and TV.

Ables Sayre headlined at the Kahala Mandarin Oriental hotel from 1999 to 2006. There, she performed as the opening act for New Year's Eve concerts by such performers as The Four Tops (2000), James Brown (2001), The Beach Boys (2002) and Kenny Loggins (2003). Ables Sayre released a CD, Dreamy, in 2001, which was nominated for a Na Hoku Hanohano Award. She first starred in the lead role of Pua Ma Lusa in the 2002 Diamond Head Theatre production of musical You Somebody by Lee Cataluna and Keola Beamer. She reprised this role in 2007, winning the Hawaii State Theater Council's Po'okela Award for Leading Female in Musical.

In 2008, she debuted on Broadway as Bloody Mary in South Pacific. For her performance, she was nominated for Tony Award for Best Featured Actress in a Musical and also won the 2008 Theatre World Award. She reprised the role in 2013 at The Muny in St. Louis, Missouri.

== Family ==
She is married to David Sayre.
