= Gotta Learn to Love Without You =

Single by Michael Johnson

from the album Wings
- B-side: "River Colorado"
- Released: April 26, 1986
- Genre: Country
- Length: 2:49
- Label: RCA
- Songwriter(s): Michael Johnson, Kent Robbins
- Producer(s): Brent Maher

Michael Johnson singles chronology
"I Love You by Heart" (1985)	"Gotta Learn to Love Without You" (1986)	"Give Me Wings" (1986)

"Gotta Learn to Love Without You" is a song co-written and recorded by American country pop artist Michael Johnson. It was released in April 1986 as the first single from the album Wings. The song reached #12 on the Billboard Hot Country Singles & Tracks chart. Johnson wrote the song with Kent Robbins.

== Chart performance ==
Chart (1986)	Peak position
US Hot Country Songs (Billboard)	12
