= Michael Johnson (singer) =

American musician and singer (1944–2017)

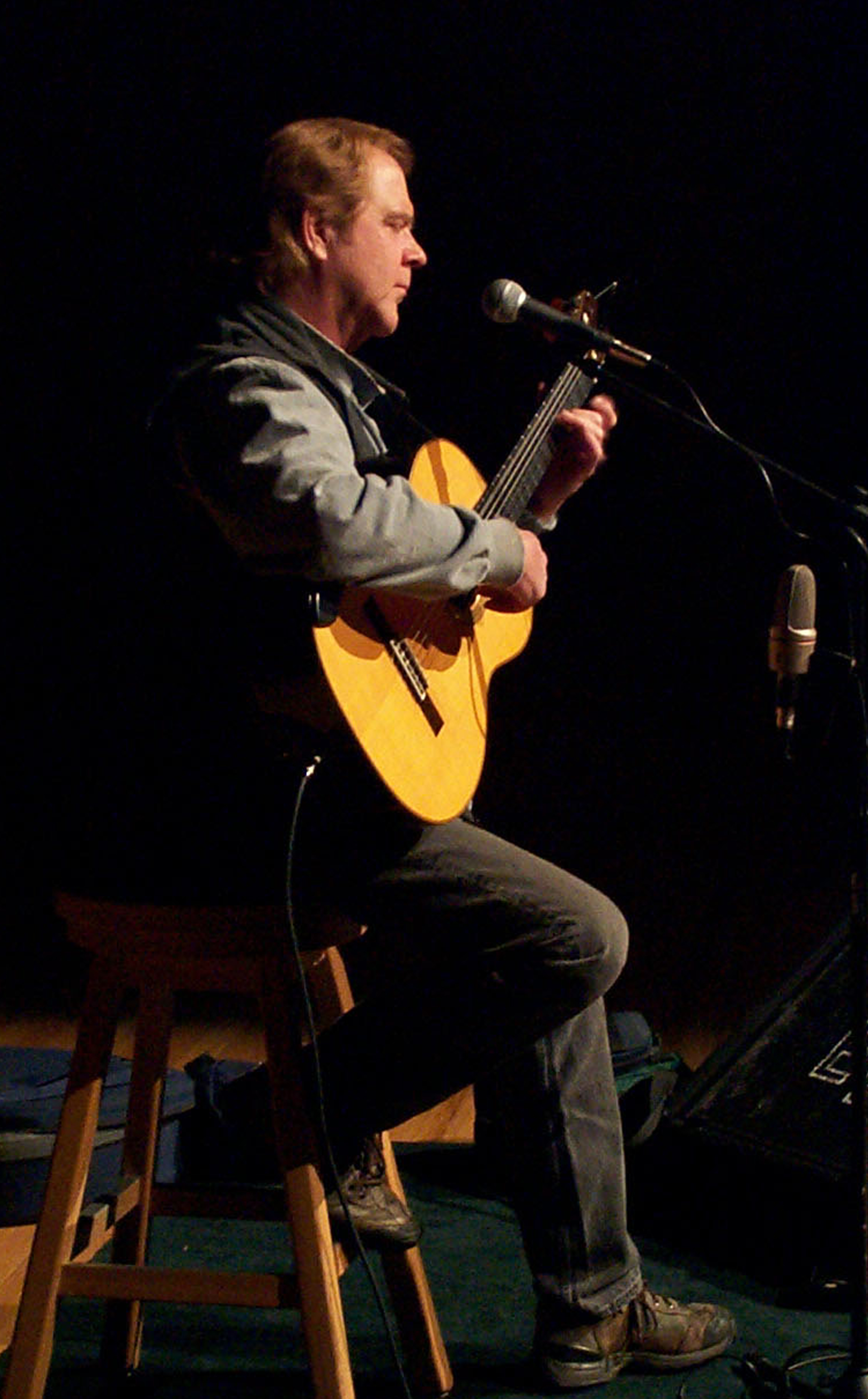
- Johnson performing in 2001

Background information
- Born: Michael Jay Johnson; August 8, 1944; Alamosa, Colorado, U.S.
- Died: July 25, 2017 (aged 72) Minneapolis, Minnesota, U.S.
- Genres: Folk; folk rock; country; soft rock
- Occupations: Singer-songwriter, instrumentalist, record producer, actor, writer
- Instruments: Vocals, classical guitar, acoustic guitar, piano
- Years active: 1957–2017
- Labels: Atco, Sanskrit Records, EMI, RCA, Vanguard, Atlantic, Intersound, American Originals, Red House
- Website: www.mjblue.com

Michael Jay Johnson (August 8, 1944 – July 25, 2017) was an American pop, country, and folk singer-songwriter and guitarist. He is best remembered for his 1978 hit song "Bluer Than Blue". He charted four hits on the Billboard Hot 100 chart and nine more on Hot Country Songs, including two number one country hits in 1986's "Give Me Wings" and "The Moon Is Still Over Her Shoulder". He also co-wrote "Cain's Blood", the debut single of 1990s country group 4 Runner.

== Career ==
Johnson was born in the small town of Alamosa, Colorado and grew up in Denver. He started playing the guitar at 13. In 1963, he began attending Colorado State College (now the University of Northern Colorado) in Greeley to study music, but his college career was truncated when he won an international talent contest two years later. First prize included a deal with Epic Records.

Wishing to hone his instrumental skills, in 1966 Johnson set off for Barcelona, Spain, to the Liceu Conservatory, studying with the eminent classical guitarists Graciano Tarragó and Renata Tarragó. Upon his return to the States, he joined Randy Sparks in a group called the New Society and did a tour of the Orient.

When the band dissolved in 1967, Johnson signed with the Chad Mitchell Trio for a year, spending some of that time co-writing with another member, John Denver. The group was renamed Denver, Boise & Johnson. When the trio came to an end, Johnson made a radical departure from everything he had done previously by taking on a major supporting role in the off-Broadway production of Jacques Brel Is Alive and Well and Living in Paris.

In 1971, Johnson signed with Atco Records to record his first album, There Is A Breeze, which was released in 1973 and produced by Johnson, Chris Dedrick, Peter Yarrow, and Phil Ramone in New York and Toronto, Ontario, Canada. Feeling this first effort was not a true reflection of his music (despite being a best seller in the Minneapolis-St. Paul area), Johnson self-produced his next LP in 1975, For All You Mad Musicians, relying more on his voice and guitar for a folk feel. He followed this up with Ain't Dis Da Life, where he added a rhythm section. With each new recording and his continued touring, his popularity was increasing.

Teaming up with Brent Maher and Steve Gibson in Nashville, Tennessee, Johnson created a two-song demo consisting of "Bluer Than Blue" and "Almost Like Being in Love" (the latter song from the Broadway musical Brigadoon). EMI America wasted no time in signing him, quickly getting The Michael Johnson Album out in 1978. The first single, "Bluer Than Blue", became Johnson's first Top 40 hit, peaking at No. 12 on the Billboard Hot 100 chart in the summer of 1978; the song became a chart-topping single on the Adult Contemporary chart. "Almost Like Being in Love" went to No. 91 on the R&B chart while hitting the Top 5 on the AC chart and the Top 40 on the pop chart.

Johnson recorded five albums in all for EMI and in 1985 moved to RCA Records, where he adopted a contemporary country style that stayed compatible with his soft, mellow leanings. He scored five Top Ten country hits from 1986 to 1989, including the chart-toppers "Give Me Wings" and "The Moon Is Still Over Her Shoulder." After two country albums on RCA (plus two greatest hits collections), Johnson moved to Atlantic Records in 1991.

In 1995, the country music group 4 Runner scored a minor hit with the single "Cain's Blood", for which Johnson co-wrote an updated version with Jack Sundrud of Poco.

== Death ==
Aged 72, Johnson died at his Minneapolis, Minnesota, home on July 25, 2017.

== Discography ==
=== Albums ===
Year	Album	Chart Positions			Label
Year	Album	US Country	US	CAN	Label
1973	There Is a Breeze		213		Atco
1975	For All You Mad Musicians				Sanskrit
1977	Ain't Dis Da Life				Sanskrit
1978	The Michael Johnson Album		81	83	EMI
1979	Dialogue		157		EMI
1980	You Can Call Me Blue		203		EMI
1981	Home Free				EMI
1983	Lifetime Guarantee				EMI
1986	Wings	26			RCA
1988	That's That				RCA
1990	The Best Of				RCA
1992	Michael Johnson				Atlantic
1995	Departure				Vanguard
1997	Then and Now				Intersound
1999	The Very Best of Michael Johnson: Bluer Than Blue (1978–1995)				Razor & Tie
2000	LIVE at the Bluebird Cafe				American Originals
2002	Classic Masters				EMI
2005	Always – Roberto Bianco with Michael Johnson				Yellow Rose
2012	Moonlit Déjà Vu				Redhouse Records

=== Singles ===
Year	Single	Peak chart positions							Album
Year	Single	US Country	US	US AC	AUS	CAN Country	CAN	CAN AC	Album
1973	"On the Road"	—	118	—	—	—	—	—	There Is a Breeze
1978	"Bluer Than Blue"	—	12	1	—	—	6	1	The Michael Johnson Album
1978	"Almost Like Being in Love"	—	32	4	—	—	40	10	The Michael Johnson Album
1979	"Sailing Without a Sail"	—	—	44	—	—	—	—	The Michael Johnson Album
1979	"This Night Won't Last Forever"	—	19	5	75	—	66	9	Dialogue
1979	"I'll Always Love You"	—	—	—	—	—	—	—	Dialogue
1979	"Doors"	—	—	—	—	—	—	—	Dialogue
1980	"The Very First Time"	—	101	29	—	—	—	—	Dialogue
1980	"You Can Call Me Blue"	—	86	34	—	—	—	37	You Can Call Me Blue
1981	"You're Not Easy to Forget"	—	—	32	—	—	—	—	Home Free
1986	"Gotta Learn to Love Without You"	12	—	—	—	—	—	—	Wings
1986	"Give Me Wings"	1	—	—	—	3	—	—	Wings
1987	"The Moon Is Still Over Her Shoulder"	1	—	—	—	2	—	—	Wings
1987	"Ponies"	26	—	—	—	—	—	—	Wings
1987	"Crying Shame"	4	—	—	—	8	—	—	That's That
1988	"I Will Whisper Your Name"	7	—	—	—	19	—	—	That's That
1988	"That's That"	9	—	—	—	8	—	—	That's That
1989	"Roller Coaster Run (Up Too Slow, Down Too Fast)"	52	—	—	—	—	—	—	That's That
1991	"It Must Be You" (with Juice Newton)	—	—	—	—	—	—	—	Michael Johnson
1992	"One Honest Tear"	—	—	—	—	—	—	—	Michael Johnson
1997	"Whenever I Call You Friend" (with Alison Krauss)	—	—	—	—	—	—	—	Then and Now
"—" denotes releases that did not chart

=== Featured singles ===
Year	Single	Artist	Peak chart positions		Album
Year	Single	Artist	US Country	CAN Country	Album
1985	"I Love You by Heart"	Sylvia	9	7	One Step Closer

== Music videos ==
Year	Video	Director
1978	"Bluer Than Blue"	Jerry Watson
1988	"That's That"	Bill Pope
1997	"Whenever I Call You Friend" (w/ Alison Krauss)	Tom Bevins
