= There Is a Breeze =

Studio album by Michael Johnson
- Released: 1973
- Recorded: 1973
- Genre: Folk rock
- Length: 41:30
- Label: Atco
- Producer: Phil Ramone, Peter Yarrow, Chris Dedrick, Michael Johnson

Michael Johnson chronology
There Is a Breeze (1973)	For All You Mad Musicians (1975)

Alternative cover
- Cover of 1976 Sanskrit re-release

Alternative cover
- Cover of 1981 EMI America re-release

Singles from There Is a Breeze
- 1. "On the Road" Released: 1973; 2. "Rooty Toot Toot for the Moon" Released: 1973

There Is a Breeze is the debut album by singer-guitarist Michael Johnson. It was first released in August 1973 on Atco Records, re-released on Sanskrit Records (a record label owned by Johnson and his manager, Keith Christianson) in 1976, and re-released on EMI America in 1981.

The album bubbled under the Billboard Top LPs chart, peaking at No. 213. Its single "On the Road" bubbled under the Billboard Hot 100, peaking at No. 118.

== Track listing ==
Side 1:

1. "Pilot Me" (Greg Brown) – 3:14
2. "In Your Eyes" (Amy Johnson) – 2:47
3. "There Is a Breeze" (Mark Henley) – 3:39
4. "See You Soon" (Paul Johnson) – 2:24
5. "Old Folks" (Jacques Brel, Gerard Jouannest, Jean Cori, Eric Blau, Mort Shuman) – 5:12
6. "Rooty Toot Toot for the Moon" (Greg Brown) – 4:41

Side 2:

1. "My Opening Farewell" (Jackson Browne) – 4:36
2. "I Got You Covered" (Biff Rose; prologue & epilogue by Michael Johnson) – 3:38
3. "On the Road" (Carl Franzen) – 3:17
4. "Study in E Minor" (H. Villa Lobos) – 4:33
5. "Happier Days" (Michael Johnson) – 2:19
6. "You've Got to Be Carefully Taught" (Richard Rodgers, Oscar Hammerstein) – 1:16

== Personnel ==
- Michael Johnson – first guitar, vocals
- Chris Dedrick – flugelhorn, pump organ, recorder, bass, backing vocals
- Phillip Markowitz – piano
- Ted Moore – drums
- Leo Kottke – bottleneck guitar
- Gary Gauger – drums, percussion
- George Ricci – cello
- Margaret Ross – harp
- Gerry Niewood – saxophone
- Ralph Towner – second guitar, 12-string guitar
- Ron Zito – drums
- Airto – percussion

== Charts ==
Chart (1980)	Peak position
Billboard Bubbling Under the Top LPs	213
