= Lee Roy Parnell discography =

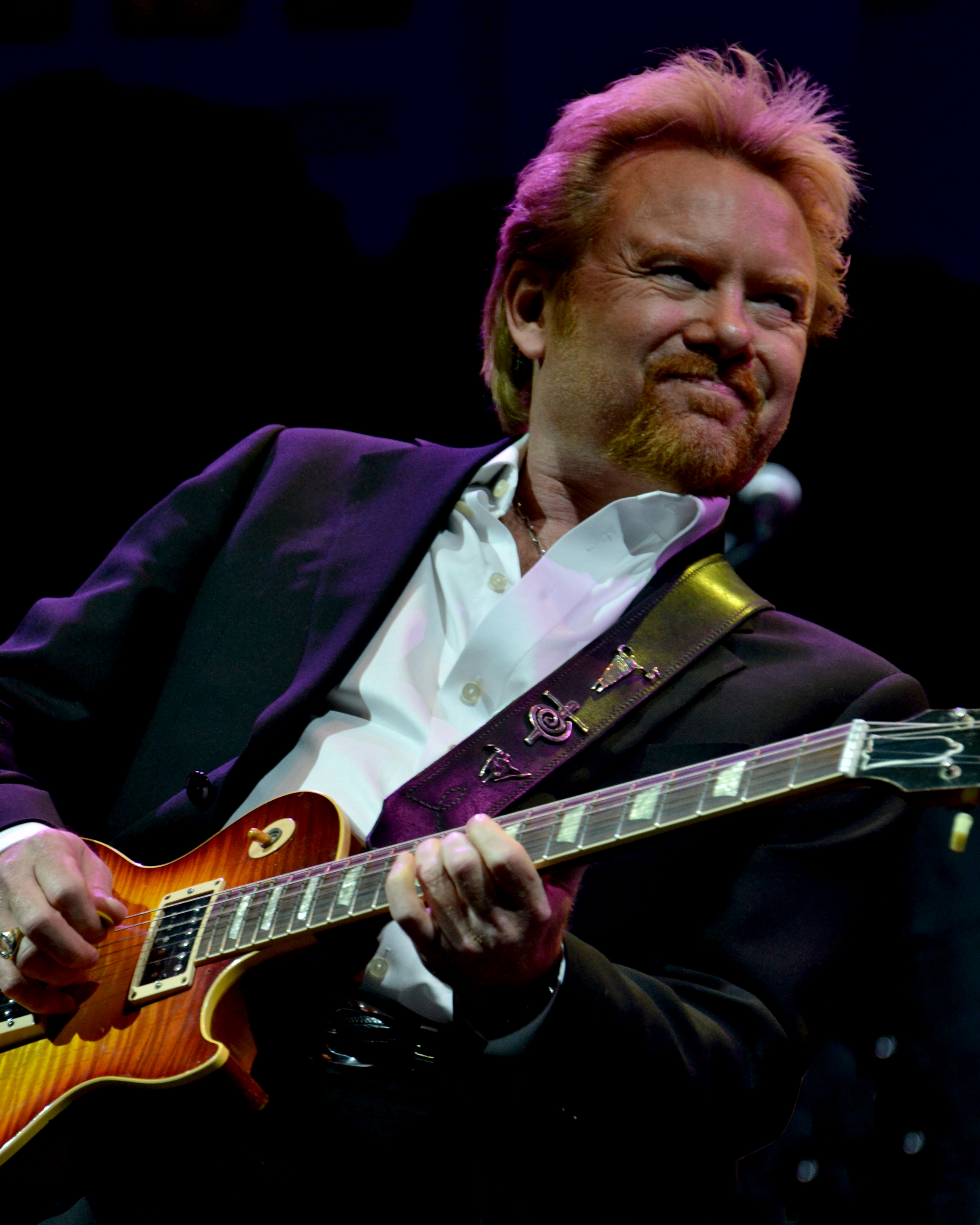
- Parnell in 2011.
- Studio albums: 8
- Compilation albums: 1
- Singles: 24

American country music singer Lee Roy Parnell has released eight studio albums, one greatest hits album, and 23 singles. He debuted in 1990 with a self-titled album for Arista Nashville, which proved commercially unsuccessful. Parnell's second album, 1992's Love Without Mercy, accounted for his first successful single "What Kind of Fool Do You Think I Am". In 1995, he transferred to Arista Nashville's Career division, but returned in 1999 when that division was shuttered. Later albums have been released on Vanguard Records, Universal South (now known as Show Dog-Universal Music), and Vector.

Parnell has charted twenty-one times as a solo artist on the Billboard Hot Country Songs charts. He has seven top-ten hits on this charts, with "What Kind of Fool Do You Think I Am", "Tender Moment", and "A Little Bit of You" having all reached number two on that chart. He was also featured on a 1994 cover of Merle Haggard's "Workin' Man Blues" alongside Diamond Rio and Steve Wariner, which was credited to Jed Zeppelin, as well as David Lee Murphy's 2004 single "Inspiration".

== Albums ==
Title	Album details	Peak positions				
Title	Album details	US Country	US	US Heat	US Blues	CAN Country
Lee Roy Parnell	Release date: April 10, 1990; Label: Arista Nashville; Formats: CD, cassette, download	—	—	—	—	—
Love Without Mercy	Release date: April 28, 1992; Label: Arista Nashville; Formats: CD, cassette, download	66	—	24	—	—
On the Road	Release date: October 26, 1993; Label: Arista Nashville; Formats: CD, cassette, download	59	—	23	—	17
We All Get Lucky Sometimes	Release date: August 1, 1995; Label: Career Records; Formats: CD, cassette, download	26	173	10	—	—
Every Night's a Saturday Night	Release date: June 17, 1997; Label: Career Records; Formats: CD, cassette, download	53	—	41	—	—
Hits and Highways Ahead	Release date: August 24, 1999; Label: Arista Nashville; Formats: CD, cassette, download	63	—	—	—	—
Tell the Truth	Release date: June 12, 2001; Label: Vanguard Records; Formats: CD, download	—	—	—	—	—
Back to the Well	Release date: March 7, 2006; Label: Universal South Records; Formats: CD, download	—	—	—	10	—
Midnight Believer	Release date: August 11, 2017; Label: Vector Records; Formats: CD, download	—	—	—	—	—
"—" denotes releases that did not chart

== Singles ==
Year	Single	Peak positions		Album
Year	Single	US Country	CAN Country	Album
1990	"Crocodile Tears"	59	90	Lee Roy Parnell
1990	"Oughta Be a Law"	54	—	Lee Roy Parnell
1990	"Family Tree"	73	—	Lee Roy Parnell
1992	"The Rock"	50	47	Love Without Mercy
1992	"What Kind of Fool Do You Think I Am"	2	3	Love Without Mercy
1992	"Love Without Mercy"	8	10	Love Without Mercy
1993	"Tender Moment"	2	10	Love Without Mercy
1993	"On the Road"	6	12	On the Road
1994	"I'm Holding My Own"	3	2	On the Road
1994	"Take These Chains from My Heart" (featuring Ronnie Dunn; uncredited)	17	21	On the Road
1994	"The Power of Love"	51	64	On the Road
1995	"A Little Bit of You"	2	2	We All Get Lucky Sometimes
1995	"When a Woman Loves a Man"	12	20	We All Get Lucky Sometimes
1996	"Heart's Desire"	3	3	We All Get Lucky Sometimes
1996	"Givin' Water to a Drowning Man"	12	10	We All Get Lucky Sometimes
1996	"We All Get Lucky Sometimes"	46	83	We All Get Lucky Sometimes
1997	"Lucky Me, Lucky You"	35	57	Every Night's a Saturday Night
1997	"You Can't Get There from Here"	39	—	Every Night's a Saturday Night
1998	"All That Matters Anymore"	50	95	Every Night's a Saturday Night
1999	"She Won't Be Lonely Long"	57	61	Hits & Highways Ahead
2001	"South by Southwest"	—	—	Tell the Truth
2006	"Daddies and Daughters"	—	—	Back to the Well
2017	"Tied Up and Tangled"	—	—	Midnight Believer
"—" denotes releases that did not chart

=== As a featured artist ===
Year	Single	Artist	Peak positions	Album
Year	Single	Artist	US Country	Album
1994	"Workin' Man Blues"	Jed Zeppelin (Note: Jed Zeppelin was a one-time collaboration of Diamond Rio, Steve Wariner, and Lee Roy Parnell.)	48	Mama's Hungry Eyes: A Tribute to Merle Haggard
2004	"Inspiration"	David Lee Murphy	46	Tryin' to Get There

== Other charted songs ==
Year	Single	Peak positions	Album
Year	Single	US Country	Album
1997	"Please Come Home for Christmas"	71	Star of Wonder: A Country Christmas Collection

== Music videos ==
Year	Video	Director
1990	"Oughta Be a Law"	Marius Penczner
1990	"Family Tree"	Marius Penczner
1991	"Mexican Money"	Dean Lent
1992	"The Rock"	Steven Goldmann
1992	"Love Without Mercy"	John Lloyd Miller
1993	"Tender Moment"	Michael Merriman
1993	"On the Road"	Michael Oblowitz
1993	"I'm Holding My Own"	Michael Oblowitz
1994	"Workin' Man Blues" (with Jed Zeppelin)	Deaton-Flanigen Productions
1995	"A Little Bit of You"	Jim Yukich
1995	"When a Woman Loves a Man" (featuring Trisha Yearwood)	Steven Goldmann
1996	"Catwalk" (featuring Flaco Jiménez)	
1997	"Lucky Me, Lucky You"	Michael McNamara
1998	"All That Matters Anymore"	Brian McNamara/Lee Roy Parnell
1998	"Texas" (featuring Ray Benson and Charlie Daniels)	Peter Zavadil
1999	"She Won't Be Lonely Long"	Peter Zavadil
2006	"Just Lucky That Way"	Milton Sneed
2006	"Saving Grace"	Milton Sneed
