= Hits and Highways Ahead =

Compilation album by Lee Roy Parnell
- Released: August 24, 1999
- Genre: Country
- Length: 46:35
- Label: Arista Nashville
- Producer: Barry Beckett, Ed Cherney, Scott Hendricks, Lee Roy Parnell

Lee Roy Parnell chronology
Every Night's a Saturday Night (1997)	Hits and Highways Ahead (1999)	Tell the Truth (2001)

Professional ratings
Review scores
Source	Rating
AllMusic	link

Hits and Highways Ahead is the first compilation album by American country music artist Lee Roy Parnell. It was released in 1999 by the Arista Nashville label. It peaked at #63 on the Top Country Albums chart.

== Track listing ==
No.	Title	Writer(s)	Length
1.	"She Won't Be Lonely Long"	Bob McDill	4:01
2.	"Heart's Desire"	Lee Roy Parnell, Cris Moore	4:12
3.	"Love Without Mercy"	Don Pfrimmer, Mike Reid	3:04
4.	"On the Road"	McDill	4:38
5.	"Long Way to Fall"	Gary Nicholson, Parnell	4:43
6.	"A Little Bit of You"	Trey Bruce, Craig Wiseman	2:41
7.	"I'm Holding My Own"	Tony Arata	4:15
8.	"What Kind of Fool Do You Think I Am"	Al Carmichael, Gary Griffin	3:36
9.	"When a Woman Loves a Man"	Rafe Van Hoy, Mark Luna	3:43
10.	"Tender Moment"	Rory Bourke, Moore, Parnell	3:08
11.	"If the House Is Rockin'"	Nicholson, Mike Henderson, Wally Wilson	3:28
12.	"John the Revelator"	Traditional	5:06

== Personnel ==
- Eddie Bayers - drums
- Richard Bennett - electric guitar
- Dan Dugmore - steel guitar
- The Fairfield Four - background vocals
- Davey Faragher - bass guitar
- Chris Harris - background vocals
- Teresa James - background vocals
- John Barlow Jarvis - piano
- John Jorgenson - electric guitar
- Jim Keltner - drums
- Kevin McKendree - piano
- Terry McMillan - percussion
- Steve Mackey - bass guitar
- Jonell Mosser - background vocals
- Lee Roy Parnell - electric guitar, slide guitar, lead vocals
- James Pennebaker - acoustic guitar, electric guitar
- Don Potter - acoustic guitar
- Michael Rhodes - bass guitar
- Joseph Rice - background vocals
- Matt Rollings - keyboards
- Russell Smith - background vocals
- Michael Spriggs - acoustic guitar
- Harry Stinson - background vocals
- Fred Tackett - acoustic guitar, electric guitar
- Scott Thurston - background vocals
- Jeffrey "C.J." Vanston - organ
- Billy Joe Walker Jr. - acoustic guitar
- Lynn Williams - drums
- Dennis Wilson - background vocals
- Glenn Worf - bass guitar
- Bob Wray - bass guitar
- Reese Wynans - organ
- Trisha Yearwood - background vocals
- Curtis Young - background vocals

== Chart performance ==
Chart (1999)	Peak position
U.S. Billboard Top Country Albums	63
