= You and You Alone (album) =

Studio album by Randy Travis
- Released: April 21, 1998
- Genre: Country
- Length: 41:50
- Label: DreamWorks
- Producer: Byron Gallimore; James Stroud; Randy Travis

Randy Travis chronology
Full Circle (1996)	You and You Alone (1998)	A Man Ain't Made of Stone (1999)

Singles from You and You Alone
- 1. "Out of My Bones" Released: March 2, 1998; 2. "The Hole" Released: June 4, 1998; 3. "Spirit of a Boy, Wisdom of a Man" Released: October 5, 1998; 4. "Stranger in My Mirror" Released: March 1, 1999

Professional ratings
Review scores
Source	Rating
AllMusic	3/5 stars
Entertainment Weekly	B
Rolling Stone	2.5/5 stars

You and You Alone is the eleventh studio album by American country music artist Randy Travis. It was released on April 21, 1998, by DreamWorks Records. It was the first release of the label's country subdivision DreamWorks Nashville, which launched in June 1997.

The album was produced four singles on the Billboard country music charts between 1998 and 1999: "Out of My Bones", "The Hole", "Spirit of a Boy, Wisdom of a Man", and "Stranger in My Mirror", which peaked at numbers 2, 9, 2 and 16, respectively, on the country charts. Counting his 1993 side project Wind in the Wire, this is also the second of three studio albums of his career not to be produced by longtime producer Kyle Lehning (Travis' succeeding album, 1999's A Man Ain't Made of Stone, was the third and final project that Lehning did not produce). Instead, Travis co-produced the album with Byron Gallimore and James Stroud.

== Information ==
"Spirit of a Boy, Wisdom of a Man" was originally recorded by Mark Collie on his 1995 album, Tennessee Plates. "Horse Called Music" is a Willie Nelson cover from his 1989 album, A Horse Called Music. "Satisfied Mind" is a Hal Ketchum cover from his 1996 greatest-hits album, The Hits.

"Only Worse" was best known for playing in the background of a diner in the 2000 DreamWorks Pictures comedy film Road Trip.

Patrick Swayze, a friend of Travis', sang background vocals on the track "I Did My Part".

== Track listing ==
No.	Title	Writer(s)	Length
1.	"The Hole"	Skip Ewing, James Dean Hicks	3:08
2.	"Out of My Bones"	Gary Burr, Robin Lerner, Sharon Vaughn	2:45
3.	"Spirit of a Boy, Wisdom of a Man"	Glen Burtnik, Trey Bruce	3:50
4.	"Only Worse"	John Jarrard, Kent Robbins	2:53
5.	"One Word Song"	Jarrard, Max T. Barnes	3:35
6.	"I Did My Part"	Don Schlitz, Billy Livsey	3:45
7.	"Horse Called Music"	Wayne Carson	4:30
8.	"I'm Still Here, You're Still Gone"	Ralph Murphy, Kevin Brandt	2:45
9.	"Easy to Love You"	Deanna Bryant, Danny Orton	3:47
10.	"Stranger in My Mirror"	Ewing, Kim Williams	3:15
11.	"You and You Alone"	Melba Montgomery, Leslie Satcher, Tim Ryan Rouillier	3:59
12.	"Satisfied Mind"	Tony Arata	3:38

== Personnel ==
Compiled from liner notes.

- Eddie Bayers – drums
- Larry Beiard – acoustic guitar
- Mike Brignardello – bass guitar
- Larry Byrom – acoustic guitar
- Stuart Duncan – fiddle
- Paul Franklin – steel guitar, Dobro
- Sonny Garrish – steel guitar, Dobro
- Vince Gill – background vocals
- Aubrey Haynie – fiddle, mandolin
- Jeff King – electric guitar
- Alison Krauss – background vocals
- Paul Leim – drums
- Terry McMillan – harmonica
- Brent Mason – acoustic guitar, electric guitar
- Melba Montgomery – background vocals
- Steve Nathan – keyboards, piano, Hammond B-3 organ
- Michael Rhodes – bass guitar
- Matt Rollings – piano, Hammond B-3 organ
- Brent Rowan – electric guitar
- John Wesley Ryles – background vocals
- Leslie Satcher – background vocals
- Patrick Swayze – background vocals on "I Did My Part"
- Randy Travis – lead vocals
- Dan Tyminski – background vocals, vibraphone
- Lonnie Wilson – drums
- Glenn Worf – bass guitar
- Curtis Wright – background vocals
- Curtis Young – background vocals

== Chart performance ==
=== Weekly charts ===
Chart (1998)	Peak position
Australian Albums (ARIA)	84
US Billboard 200	49
US Top Country Albums (Billboard)	7

=== Year-end charts ===
Chart (1998)	Position
US Top Country Albums (Billboard)	53
