= Calloused Hands =

Single by Mark Collie

from the album Born and Raised in Black & White
- B-side: "Johnny Was a Rebel"
- Released: June 29, 1991
- Genre: Country
- Length: 3:16
- Label: MCA
- Songwriters: Pat Alger, Gene Levine
- Producers: Doug Johnson, Tony Brown

Mark Collie singles chronology
"Let Her Go" (1991)	"Calloused Hands" (1991)	"She's Never Comin' Back" (1991)

"Calloused Hands" is a song written by Pat Alger and Gene Levine, and recorded by American country music artist Mark Collie. It was released in June 1991 as the first single from the album Born and Raised in Black & White. The song reached #31 on the Billboard Hot Country Singles & Tracks chart.

== Chart performance ==
Chart (1991)	Peak position
Canada Country Singles (RPM)	19
US Hot Country Songs (Billboard)	31
