= Tennessee Plates =

Studio album by Mark Collie
- Released: July 18, 1995
- Genre: Country
- Length: 38:13
- Label: Giant
- Producer: Mark Collie; James Stroud

Mark Collie chronology
Unleashed (1994)	Tennessee Plates (1995)	Even the Man in the Moon Is Cryin (1998)

Singles from Tennessee Plates
- 1. "Three Words, Two Hearts, One Night" Released: June 17, 1995

Professional ratings
Review scores
Source	Rating
AllMusic	3/5 stars

Tennessee Plates is the fifth studio album by American country music singer-songwriter Mark Collie. It was his only album for Giant Records. It featured 3 singles. "Three Words, Two Hearts, One Night" charted at number 25, while "Steady as She Goes" reached at peak of 65. The last single "Lipstick Don't Lie" failed to chart. "Spirit of a Boy, Wisdom of a Man" was later released as a single by Randy Travis from his 1998 album You and You Alone.

== Track listing ==
CD
No.	Title	Writer(s)	Length
1.	"Steady as She Goes"	Bob DiPiero, John Scott Sherrill, Michael Murgrage	2:56
2.	"There's Just You"	Mark Collie, Dean Dillon, Sanger D. Shafer	3:36
3.	"Three Words, Two Hearts, One Night"	Collie, Gerry House	2:48
4.	"Lipstick Don't Lie"	Trey Bruce, Collie	4:07
5.	"We'll Never Say Goodbye"	Collie	4:08
6.	"Tennessee Plates"	John Hiatt, Mike Porter	2:52
7.	"Memories (Still Missing Her)"	Collie, Rafe Van Hoy	3:30
8.	"Tunica Motel"	Tony Joe White	4:05
9.	"Spirit of a Boy, Wisdom of a Man"	Bruce, Glen Burtnik	3:23
10.	"Those Days Are Gone"	Lewis Anderson, Collie	3:22
11.	"Chasin' a Dream Called Love"	Collie, Van Hoy	3:26
Total length:			38:13

== Production ==
- Produced by James Stroud & Mark Collie
- Recorded by John Guess; assisted by Derek Bason
- Additional Recording By Kevin Beamish & Julian King; assisted by Mark Hagen, Ricky Cobble & Peter Martinez
- Mixed by John Guess; assisted by Derek Bason
- Mastered by John Guess & Marty Williams
- Production Co-Ordination: Abbe Nameche & Doug Rich

== Personnel ==
- Larry Byrom – acoustic guitar
- Mark Collie – lead vocals, acoustic guitar
- Stuart Duncan – fiddle
- Paul Franklin – steel guitar
- John Hobbs – piano
- Dann Huff – electric guitar
- Paul Leim – drums
- Steve Nathan – Hammond B-3 organ
- Matt Rollings – piano
- Leland Sklar – bass guitar
- James Stroud – drums
- Tony Joe White – electric guitar on "Tunica Motel"
