= When a Woman Loves a Man =

When a Woman Loves a Man may refer to:

- "When a Woman Loves a Man" (1938 song), a song by Bernie Hanighen and Gordon Jenkins, with lyrics by Johnny Mercer
- "When a Woman Loves a Man" (Lee Roy Parnell song), a 1995 single by Lee Roy Parnell
- "When a Woman Loves a Man", a song by Westlife from the album Turnaround
- "When a Woman Loves a Man", a song with words by Billy Rose and music by Ralph Rainger sung by Fannie Brice in the 1930 film Be Yourself!

== See also ==
- When a Man Loves a Woman (disambiguation)
