= Born and Raised in Black & White =

Studio album by Mark Collie
- Released: July 23, 1991
- Studio: Emerald Sound Studios, Music Mill Studios, Nashville, TN
- Genre: Country music
- Length: 34:12
- Label: MCA Records
- Producer: Tony Brown; Doug Johnson

Mark Collie chronology
Hardin County Line (1990)	Born and Raised in Black & White (1991)	Mark Collie (1993)

Singles from Born and Raised in Black & White
- 1. "Calloused Hands" Released: June 29, 1991; 2. "She's Never Comin' Back" Released: October 26, 1991; 3. "It Don't Take a Lot" Released: February 1992

Born and Raised in Black & White is the second studio album by American country music singer-songwriter Mark Collie. It was released on MCA in 1991. "Calloused Hands", "She's Never Comin' Back", and "It Don't Take a Lot" were released as singles.

It features a cover of the song "Lucky Dog", originally recorded by country singer Keith Whitley on his 1988 album Don't Close Your Eyes. He also covers Tex Williams' classic 1960 song, "Ballad of Thunder Road", written by Robert Mitchum and recorded by him in 1963.

The Jamie O'Hara penned song, "There Goes My Dream", would later be recorded by The Dixie Chicks in 1993 for their album, Shouldn't a Told You That.

== Critical reception ==
Professional ratings
Review scores
Source	Rating
Allmusic	2.5/5 stars

Giving it 2.5 out of 5 stars, Brian Mansfield of AllMusic wrote that "The first half of Collie's second album contained some smartly written songs...but some of the first album's edge had been smoothed off."

== Track listing ==
CD
No.	Title	Writer(s)	Length
1.	"She's Never Comin' Back"	Mark Collie, Gerry House	2:50
2.	"When The Sun Goes Down"	Collie, Marty Stuart	2:38
3.	"It Don't Take a Lot"	Collie, Larry Shell	3:16
4.	"Calloused Hands"	Pat Alger, Gene Levine	3:16
5.	"Ten Lonely Nights"	Collie, Paul Kennerley	2:47
6.	"There Goes My Dream"	Jamie O'Hara	4:02
7.	"Born and Raised in Black and White"	Don Cook, John Barlow Jarvis	4:04
8.	"Ballad of Thunder Road"	Robert Mitchum, Don Raye	3:59
9.	"Lucky Dog"	Bill Caswell, Verlon Thompson	2:44
10.	"Johnny Was a Rebel"	Collie	4:36
Total length:			34:12

== Production ==
- Produced by Tony Brown & Doug Johnson
- Engineered by Doug Johnson
- Second Engineers: Brad Jones, Russ Martin, Graham Smith
- Mixed by Doug Johnson
- Digital Editing: Milan Bogdan
- Mastered by Glenn Meadows

== Personnel ==
- Mark Collie: Vocals, acoustic guitars
- Pat Flynn, Mac McAnally: Acoustic guitars
- John Willis, James Burton: Electric guitars
- Steve Gibson: Acoustic and electric guitars, mandolin, pedabro and six-string bass
- Paul Franklin: Pedabro, dobro and steel guitar
- John Barlow Jarvis, Steve Nathan: Keyboards
- Hassell Teekell: Organ, backing vocals
- David Hungate: Electric and six-string bass
- Eddie Bayers: Drums
- Lance Dary, Jamie O'Hara, Jim Photoglo, Russell Smith, Harry Stinson: Backing vocals
