= Born to Love You =

Born to Love You may refer to:

- "Born to Love You" (Mark Collie song), by Mark Collie, 1993
- "Born to Love You" (Lanco song), by Lanco, 2018
- Born to Love You (film), a 2012 Filipino romantic film
