= Spirit of a Boy, Wisdom of a Man =

Single by Randy Travis

from the album You and You Alone
- Released: October 5, 1998
- Genre: Country
- Length: 3:50
- Label: DreamWorks
- Songwriters: Trey Bruce; Glen Burtnik
- Producers: Randy Travis, Byron Gallimore, James Stroud

Randy Travis singles chronology
"The Hole" (1998)	"Spirit of a Boy, Wisdom of a Man" (1998)	"Stranger in My Mirror" (1999)

"Spirit of a Boy, Wisdom of a Man" is a song written by Trey Bruce and Glen Burtnik. First recorded by Mark Collie on his 1995 album Tennessee Plates, it was later recorded by Randy Travis. Released in October 1998 as the third single from his 1998 CD, You and You Alone, it peaked at number 2 on the Hot Country Singles & Tracks (now Hot Country Songs) chart, behind "Stand Beside Me" by Jo Dee Messina.

== Content ==
The song is a mid-tempo backed primarily by acoustic guitar. Its lyrics tell the story of decisions a boy must make in his life and whether he should follow his whims ("spirit of a boy") or act with integrity and good faith ("wisdom of a man") when his high school sweetheart tells him that she is pregnant, and when he is faced with the temptations of life on the road after being married with a child at home.

== Music video ==
The music video debuted as CMT's sneak peek video on October 7, 1998. It was filmed at the Los Angeles Herald Examiner office.

== Chart performance ==
"Spirit of a Boy, Wisdom of a Man" debuted at number 53 on the U.S. Billboard Hot Country Singles & Tracks for the week of October 10, 1998.

Chart (1998–1999)	Peak position
Canada Country Singles (RPM)	7
US Billboard Hot 100	42
US Hot Country Songs (Billboard)	2

=== Year-end charts ===
Chart (1999)	Position
Canada Country Tracks (RPM)	67
US Country Songs (Billboard)	51
