= John Lloyd Miller =

American filmmaker

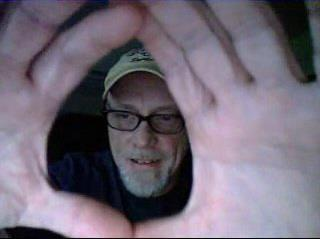

Background information
- Born: Elizabeth, New Jersey, U.S.
- Occupations: Film director, film producer, writer, music video director
- Years active: 1983– present
- Website: Official Website

John Lloyd Miller is an American filmmaker who has directed, produced and/or written music videos, short films, features, documentaries, commercials and television programming.

== Career ==
Miller has worked in virtually every aspect of the film and television business as a director, writer and producer. He began his career while attending the graduate film production program at the University of Southern California. Miller attended USC Film School with such notables as Jay Roach, Greg Beeman and Ken Kwapis. Miller won a Golden Reel award along with Jacqueline Woolf for their work on "The Big Garage" directed by Greg Beeman Miller began working with early music video director Jack Cole as a writer and eventually as a co-director for such artists as, Bon Jovi, Steve Perry, Amy Grant, Sawyer Brown and Dionne Warwick.

Miller has directed over 250 music videos, including Garth Brooks', "The Dance", The Smithereens, "A Girl Like You", Eazy-E and N.W.A, "Easier Said than Dunn", Reba McEntire, "What If", Dolly Parton, "Just When I Needed You Most", The Goo Goo Dolls, "There You Are", The Fat Boys and Chubby Checker, "The Twist", Billy Ray Cyrus, "I Give My Heart to You" and Joe Cocker, "You Are So Beautiful".

Miller grew up in Westfield, New Jersey and upon graduation from Westfield High School, he enlisted in the United States Navy. Miller served aboard the USS Nitro (AE-23) as a decorated member of X Division.

After the Navy Miller attended Northeastern University in Boston where Miller got his first taste of production by working as an editor and director for the school's television station. Miller graduated with honors and left for California to attend the MFA program at the University of Southern California.

Miller's work in music video has won countless awards, including video of the year awards for Billboard Magazine, MusicRow, ACM Awards, CMA Awards, Cine Golden Eagle and CCMA. Several of John Lloyd Miller's videos appear in CMT's Greatest Videos of All Time, including Vince Gill, "One More Last Chance", Vince Gill, "Go Rest High on That Mountain", K. T. Oslin, "'80s Ladies", George Strait, "Check Yes or No", Travis Tritt, "More Than You'll Ever Know", and Garth Brooks', "The Dance", which is listed as in the top five all time. A six time CMA Award nominee, John Lloyd Miller is one of the top ten country music video directors of all time.

In 1999 Miller collaborated with country music star Mark Collie to create what eventually became the critically acclaimed, award-winning film, "I Still Miss Someone." It was the first film portrayal of Johnny Cash. The film won awards around the world and was the only short film selected to be shown in the "30 Greatest Films of the Last 30 Years," alongside such films as "Blue Velvet", "Easy Rider", "Pulp Fiction" at the Woodstock Festival.

Miller's has directed TV shows for HBO, VH1 and many more. As a screenwriter, Miller was contracted to write a series of three feature scripts for Dove Canyon Films. They include, "Saucer" an adaptation of New York Times Bestseller Stephen Coonts novel of the same name, "Butterfly Kisses" and "St. X Prep". He is a member of Writers Guild of America, East.

Miller is referenced in The Garth Factor: The Career Behind The Country's Big Boom , The Encyclopedia of Country Music,Country Music Trivia & Fact Book and The Garth Brooks Scrapbook, and was a contributing writer to The Real Meaning of Life.

Miller is the founder of The AV Squad, his production company in Tennessee and a co-creator of Beacon Bay Creative with offices in Los Angeles, Hilton Head and Nashville.

Miller is the father of twins, Jack and Ella, and resides primarily in Brentwood, Tennessee.

== Awards ==
=== Film and television ===
Title	Type	Award	Notes
I Still Miss Someone	Short film	Best Short Film, New York Independent Film Festival	Won
I Still Miss Someone	Short film	Best Short Film, Yahoo! Online Film Festival	Won
I Still Miss Someone	Short film	Best Short Film, Atlantic City Film Festival	Won
I Still Miss Someone	Short film	Nashville Film Festival (2 awards) -Best Film -Best Short Film	Won
I Still Miss Someone	Short film	Method Fest, Best Actor (Mark Collie)	Won
I Still Miss Someone	Short film	Zoie Fest (2 awards) -Best Picture, Dramatic Short -Audience Award, Best Short Film	Won
I Still Miss Someone	Short film	Best Narrative Short, South by Southwest	Nominated
I Still Miss Someone	Short film	Best Short Film, Oberhausen International Festival	Nominated
"Crack Baby"; The United Way	commercials	Gold Award, WorldFest International	Won
"Butterfly Kisses"	TV specials	Gold Award, WorldFest International	Won
"Influences"; HBO	TV specials	Grand Prize, WorldFest International	Won
"Pickin' on Nashville"	Long Form	Platinum Award, RIAA Award	Won
"Vince Gill:The Videos"	Long Form	Platinum Award, RIAA Award	Won

=== Music videos ===
Title	Artist	Award	Notes
"I Give My Heart to You"	Billy Ray Cyrus	Gold Award, WorldFest International	Won
"I Give My Heart to You"	Billy Ray Cyrus	Video of the Year, MusicRow Awards	Won
"The Dance"	Garth Brooks	Video of the Year, CMA Awards	Won
"The Dance"	Garth Brooks	Video of the Year, Music City News	Won
"The Dance"	Garth Brooks	Video of the Year, ACM Awards	Won
"What If"	Reba McEntire	Gold Award, WorldFest International	Won
"What If"	Reba McEntire	Grand Prize, Cine Golden Eagle	Won
"Every Light in the House"	Cledus T. Judd	Best Independent Video of the Year, CMT	Won
"Dumas Walker"	The Kentucky Headhunters	Video of the Year, CMA Awards	Nominated
"Oh Lonesome Me"	The Kentucky Headhunters	Video of the Year, Billboard Magazine	Won
"Oh Lonesome Me"	The Kentucky Headhunters	Video of the Year, Music Row Awards	Won
"The Ballad of Davy Crockett	The Kentucky Headhunters	Video of the Year, Billboard Magazine	Won
"Little Tears"	Joy Lynn White	Grand Prize, Cine Golden Eagle	Won
"Little Tears"	Joy Lynn White	Grand Prize, WorldFest International	Won
"Butterfly Kisses"	Bob Carlisle	Gold Award, WorldFest International	Won
"That Kind of Girl"	Patty Loveless	New York Film Festival	Nominated
"Check Yes or No"	George Strait	Grand Prize, TNN	Won
"Check Yes or No"	George Strait	Video of the Year, CMA Awards	Nominated
"Check Yes or No"	George Strait	Video of the Year, Country Weekly Magazine	Won
"Go Rest High on That Mountain"	Vince Gill	Video of the Year, CCMA	Won
"Go Rest High on That Mountain"	Vince Gill	WorldFest International	Nominated
"Go Rest High on That Mountain"	Vince Gill	Video of the Year, CMA Awards	Nominated
"Don't Let Our Love Start Slippin' Away"	Vince Gill	Video of the Year, CMA Awards	Nominated
"Look at Us"	Vince Gill	Video of the Year, CMA Awards	Nominated
"When Love Finds You"	Vince Gill	Video of the Year, CMA Awards	Nominated
"80's Ladies"	K.T. Oslin	Video of the Year, ACM Awards	Won

== Select music video filmography ==
- Lillo Thomas, "Wanna Make Love"
- The Fat Boys featuring Chubby Checker, "The Twist"
- Garth Brooks, "The Dance"
- Garth Brooks, "If Tomorrow Never Comes"
- Kevin Skinner, "The Last Goodbye"
- Reba McEntire, "What If"
- Goo Goo Dolls, "There You Are"
- The Smithereens, "A Girl Like You"
- The Smithereens, "Top of the Pops"
- The Smithereens, "Blues Before and After"
- The Smithereens and Belinda Carlisle, "Blue Period"
- Joe Cocker, "What Are You Doing with a Fool Like Me"
- Joe Cocker, "You Are So Beautiful" (unplugged)
- Joe Cocker, "Unchain My Heart" (co-director)
- Vince Gill, "Go Rest High on That Mountain"
- Vince Gill, "I Still Believe in You"
- Vince Gill, "A Little More Love"
- Vince Gill, "When Love Finds You"
- Vince Gill, "Tryin' to Get Over You"
- Vince Gill, "Never Knew Lonely"
- Vince Gill, "Don't Let Our Love Start Slippin' Away"
- Vince Gill, "Pocket Full of Gold"
- Vince Gill, "What the Cowgirls Do"
- Vince Gill, "Look at Us"
- Vince Gill, "Liza Jane"
- Vince Gill, "One More Last Chance"
- Vince Gill, "Have Yourself a Merry Little Christmas"
- Eazy-E & N.W.A, "Eazy-er Said Than Dunn"
- Bryan White, Linda Davis, John Berry, Jimmy Fortune, Mila Mason, Kevin Sharp, Mark Collie & Wayne Warner, "God Bless The Children"
- Travis Tritt, "More Than You'll Ever Know"
- Travis Tritt and Marty Stuart, "This One's Gonna Hurt You"
- Bob Carlisle, "Butterfly Kisses"
- Bob Carlisle, "A Father's Love"
- Ricky Skaggs, "Solid Ground"
- Billy Ray Cyrus, "Give My Heart To You"
- Billy Ray Cyrus and Bobby Cyrus, "The Milkman's Eyes"
- Dolly Parton and Alison Krauss, "Just When I Needed You Most"
- George Jones, "Wild Irish Rose"
- George Strait, "Check Yes or No"
- George Strait, "Baby's Gotten Good at Goodbye"
- Patsy Cline, "Crazy"
- Identical Strangers, "Julianna Wilson",
- Cledus T. Judd, "Wives Do It All The Time"
- Cledus T. Judd, "Every Light in the House Is Blown"
- Cledus T. Judd with Buck Owens, "First Redneck on the Internet"
- Phil Perry, "Call Me"
- Melba Moore and Freddie Jackson, "I Can't Complain"
- The Mavericks, "Hey Good Lookin'"
- The Fat Boys and Chubby Checker, "The Twist"
- The Kentucky Headhunters, "Walk Softly on This Heart of Mine"
- The Kentucky Headhunters, "Dumas Walker"
- The Kentucky Headhunters, "Oh Lonesome Me"
- The Kentucky Headhunters, "The Ballad of Davy Crockett"
- The Kentucky Headhunters, "Honky Tonk Walkin'"
- The Kentucky Headhunters, "Dixie Fried"
- The Kentucky Headhunters, "Singin' the Blues"
- Kool & the Gang, "Strong"
- NewSong, "Rhythm of the World"
- Patty Loveless, "I'm That Kind of Girl"
- Patty Loveless, "Hurt Me Bad"
- Patty Loveless, "I Try to Think About Elvis"
- Patty Loveless, "The Night's Too Long"
- Patty Loveless, "Chains"
- Patty Loveless, "Jealous Bone"
- John Berry, "Your Love Amazes Me"
- John Berry, "Standing on the Edge of Goodbye"
- Lee Roy Parnell, "Love Without Mercy"
- Bobbie Cryner, "I Just Can't Stand To Be Unhappy"
- Bobbie Cryner, "You'd Think He'd Know Me Better"
- Bobbie Cryner, "I Didn't Know My Own Strength"
- Major Rising, "Dare The World"
- T. Graham Brown, "Come as You Were"
- Marty Stuart, "Tempted"
- Marty Stuart, "Now That's Country"
- Marty Stuart, "Thanks to You"
- Marty Stuart, "Red Red Wine"
- Marty Stuart, "Kiss Me, I'm Gone"
- Marty Stuart, "That's What Love's About"
- Marty Stuart, "Love and Luck"
- Marty Stuart, "Hey Baby"
- Tanya Tucker, "Strong Enough to Bend" (co-director)
- Dionne Warwick and Kashif, "Reservations for Two"
- Kashif and Meli'sa Morgan, "Love Changes"
- Rhonda Gunn, "Some Somebody"
- Hank Williams, Jr., "Come on Over to the Country"
- Tourniquet, "Crawl to China"
- Aaron Tippin, "There Ain't Nothin' Wrong with the Radio"
- James Bonamy, "Dog on a Tool Box"
- Joy Lynn White, "Bad Loser"
- Joy Lynn White, "Little Tears"
- Joy Lynn White, "True Confessions"
- Hank Flamingo, "Baby It's You"
- Skip Ewing, "If A Man Could Live on Love Alone"
- Neal McCoy, "They're Playin' Our Song"
- Neal McCoy, "If I Was a Drinkin' Man"
- Mark Collie, "Something With a Ring to It"
- Mark Collie, "Looks Aren't Everything"
- Mark Collie, "Hardin County Line"
- Mark Collie, "She's Never Comin' Back"
- Mark Collie, "Let Her Go"
- Mark Collie, "Born to Love You"
- Mark Collie, "Even the Man in the Moon Is Cryin'"
- Mark Collie, "Three Words"
- Mark Collie, "It Is No Secret"
- Mark Collie, "Hard Lovin' Woman"
- Bryan White, "Someone Else's Star"
- Mark Chesnutt, "Ol' Country"
- Mark Chesnutt, "I'll Think of Something"
- Mark Chesnutt, "Almost Goodbye"
- Mark Chesnutt, "It Sure Is Monday"
- Mac McAnally, "Down the Road"
- Mac McAnally, "Not That Long Ago"
- Diamond Rio, "In a Week or Two"
- Lionel Cartwright, "Say It's Not True"
- Lionel Cartwright, "Leap of Faith"
- Lionel Cartwright, "I Watched It All"
- Butch Baker, "Our Little Corner"
- K. T. Oslin, "80's Ladies" (co-director)
- K. T. Oslin, "I'll Always Come Back" (co-director)
- Ronnie Milsap, "A Woman in Love"
- Restless Heart, "Dancy's Dream"
- Deborah Allen, "Break These Chains"
- Sawyer Brown, "The Race Is On"
- Sawyer Brown, "Somewhere in the Night" (co-director)
- Marty Brown, "Every Now and Then"
- Marty Brown, "High & Dry"
- Marty Brown, "You Must Be Mistaken Me"
- Marty Brown, "Can't Wrap Your Arms Around A Memory"
- Marty Brown, "It Must Be the Rain"
- Marty Brown, "Cryin', Lovin', Leavin'"
- PT Gazell, "When I Fall in Love"
- The Cox Family, "Runaway"
- Bobby Cyrus and Billy Ray Cyrus, "Milkman's Eyes"

== Select commercials, TV, & film ==
- "I Still Miss Someone", film, written by John Lloyd Miller & Mark Collie, directed by John Lloyd Miller
- "The Mobile Limits", film, Ortiva Wireless, produced & directed by John Lloyd Miller
- "Saucer", screenplay adaptation of Stephen Coonts' novel, Dove Canyon Films
- "Saint X Prep", screenplay by John Lloyd Miller, Dove Canyon Films
- "Butterfly Kisses", screenplay by John Lloyd Miller, Dove Canyon Films
- "Pigeon Forge Department of Tourism", tour videos, 1996–present
- "Pigeon Forge Department of Tourism", travel videos, 1996–present
- "Pigeon Forge Department of Tourism", city videos, 1996–present
- "Every Child Needs Love", Dave Thomas Foundation for Adoption, National Spots
- "Every Child Needs Love", Dave Thomas Foundation for Adoption, Canada
- "Wild Irish Rose", National Veterans Association, National Spots
- "Bye Bye Love", Gaylord Entertainment Company, National Spots
- "Premier Estates", Governor's Club and Resort, Regional Spots
- "Crack Baby", The United Way, Regional Spots
- "Butterfly Kisses", BMG Music, Home Video, Long Form TV, Spots, Music Video,
- "Marty Stuart Christmas", MCA Records, National Spot
- "Maggie", The United Way, Regional Spot
- "Newborn", Baptist Hospital, Regional Spot
- "Roxanne", The United Way, Regional Spot
- "Dare The World", B-Venturous Records, National Spot
- "Vince Gill, The Videos", MCA Records, DVD compilation
- "Patty Loveless: Greatest Hits", MCA Records. DVD compilation
- "Live Opening Night", The Alabama Grill, multi-camera live satellite broadcast
- "Desert Star", US Military, Salute to the troops of Desert Storm
- "Butterfly Kisses", BMG/Provident Music, TV special
- "Pickin' on Nashville", VH1, TV special
- "Influences, Featuring Randy Travis and George Jones", HBO, special
- "Magic Johnson Foundation" Awards, live event featuring Muhammad Ali, Will Smith, Eddie Murphy, et al.
- "The Big Bad Music Special", BET, live concert – Ludacris, Chaka Khan, Boyz II Men
- "Magic Comedy Slam, hosted by Steve Harvey, BET – comedy special
- "Magic Johnson All Star Basketball", live event and live sports at the Staples Center
- "DVD on TV", FX Networks, four episodes "Batman Begins", "Walk the Line", "Mr. & Mrs. Smith", "Fantastic Four"
- "Alive at Brushy Mountain", Wilbanks Entertainment, documentary
