= A Man Ain't Made of Stone =

Studio album by Randy Travis
- Released: September 21, 1999
- Genre: Country
- Label: DreamWorks
- Producers: Byron Gallimore, James Stroud, Randy Travis

Randy Travis chronology
You and You Alone (1998)	A Man Ain't Made of Stone (1999)	Inspirational Journey (2000)

Singles from A Man Ain't Made of Stone
- 1. "A Man Ain't Made of Stone" Released: August 23, 1999

Professional ratings
Review scores
Source	Rating
AllMusic	3/5 stars
Entertainment Weekly	B
Hot Press	(mixed)
People	(favorable)
Q	3/5 stars

A Man Ain't Made of Stone is the twelfth studio album by American country music artist Randy Travis. It was released on September 21, 1999, by DreamWorks Records. It was produced four singles, of which only one — the title track — was a Top 40 hit on the Billboard country charts. Additionally, this album was the last of only three albums in Travis' career not to be produced by longtime producer, Kyle Lehning.

Two of this album's tracks were previously cut by other artists: "A Little Bitty Crack in Her Heart" on Sammy Kershaw's 1996 album Politics, Religion and Her, and "I'll Be Right Here Loving You" on Rhett Akins' 1998 album What Livin's All About.

== Track listing ==
No.	Title	Writer(s)	Length
1.	"A Little Bitty Crack in Her Heart"	Shawn Camp, Jim Rushing	2:36
2.	"A Little Left of Center"	Billy Henderson, Steven Dale Jones	3:02
3.	"A Man Ain't Made of Stone"	Gary Burr, Robin Lerner, Franne Golde	3:32
4.	"The Family Bible and the Farmer's Almanac"	Bob Regan, Lee Thomas Miller	3:06
5.	"A Heartache in the Works"	Chet Biggers, Melba Montgomery	3:21
6.	"No Reason to Change"	Troy Seals, Mentor Williams	3:11
7.	"Where Can I Surrender"	Rock Killough	3:21
8.	"I'll Be Right Here Loving You"	Jeffrey Steele, T. W. Hale	2:57
9.	"Once You've Heard the Truth"	Leslie Satcher, Chuck Jones	3:29
10.	"In a Heart Like Mine"	Skip Ewing, Donny Kees	2:49
11.	"Day One"	Jimmy Yeary, Max D. Barnes	4:07
12.	"Thirteen Mile Goodbye"	Burr, Gerry House	3:24

== Personnel ==
- Michael Black - background vocals
- Mike Brignardello - bass guitar
- Carol Chase - background vocals
- Tabitha Fair - background vocals
- Paul Franklin - steel guitar
- Sonny Garrish - steel guitar
- Aubrey Haynie - fiddle, mandolin
- Paul Leim - drums
- Jerry McPherson - electric guitar
- Brent Mason - electric guitar
- Matt Rollings - keyboards, piano
- Brent Rowan - electric guitar
- John Wesley Ryles - background vocals
- Lisa Silver - background vocals
- Kim Parent - background vocals
- Gary Smith - keyboards, piano
- Russell Terrell - background vocals
- Randy Travis - lead vocals
- Cindy Richardson-Walker - background vocals
- Biff Watson - acoustic guitar
- Curtis Young - background vocals

== Chart performance ==
Chart (1999)	Peak position
U.S. Billboard Top Country Albums	15
U.S. Billboard 200	130
Canadian RPM Country Albums	11
