= Three Words, Two Hearts, One Night =

Single by Mark Collie

from the album Tennessee Plates
- B-side: "Tunica Motel"
- Released: June 17, 1995
- Genre: Country
- Length: 2:48
- Label: Giant
- Songwriter(s): Mark Collie, Gerry House
- Producer(s): James Stroud, Mark Collie

Mark Collie singles chronology
"Hard Lovin' Woman" (1994)	"Three Words, Two Hearts, One Night" (1995)	"Steady as She Goes" (1995)

"Three Words, Two Hearts, One Night" is a song co-written and recorded by American country music artist Mark Collie. It was released in June 1995 as the first single from the album Tennessee Plates. The song reached #25 on the Billboard Hot Country Singles & Tracks chart. The song was written by Collie and Gerry House.

== Chart performance ==
Chart (1995)	Peak position
US Hot Country Songs (Billboard)	25
Canadian RPM Country Tracks	42
