= When a Man Loves a Woman =

When a Man Loves a Woman may refer to:

- "When a Man Loves a Woman" (song), a song recorded by Percy Sledge
- "When a Man Loves a Woman" (Jody Watley song)
- When a Man Loves a Woman (album), an album recorded by George Lam
- When a Man Loves a Woman (film), a 1994 American romantic drama starring Andy García and Meg Ryan
- "When a Man Loves a Woman" (Hercules: The Legendary Journeys), an episode of Hercules: The Legendary Journeys
- When a Man Loves a Woman (2000 film), a Hong Kong film starring Lawrence Ng
- When a Man Loves a Woman (TV series), a 1995 Hong Kong series on TVB starring Esther Kwan
- Man in Love (2014 film), a 2014 South Korean film with different English translations

== See also ==
- When a Woman Loves a Man (disambiguation)
- When a Man Loves (disambiguation)
- When a Man Loves Two Women
