= Hardin County Line =

Studio album by Mark Collie
- Released: March 29, 1990
- Recorded: 1989
- Studio: GroundStar Lab (Nashville, Tennessee); Sound Emporium (Nashville, Tennessee); Sound Stage (Nashville, Tennessee)
- Genre: Country
- Length: 29:46
- Label: MCA Records
- Producer: Tony Brown; Doug Johnson

Mark Collie chronology
Hardin County Line (1990)	Born and Raised in Black & White (1991)

Singles from Hardin County Line
- 1. "Something With a Ring to It" Released: January 1990; 2. "Looks Aren't Everything" Released: June 9, 1990; 3. "Hardin' County Line" Released: October 1990; 4. "Let Her Go" Released: February 9, 1991

Hardin County Line is the debut studio album by American country music singer-songwriter Mark Collie. It featured 4 singles, two of which, "Looks Aren't Everything" & "Let Her Go", hit the top 40. The other two, the title track and "Something With A Ring To It" failed to chart. The album itself reached a peak of number 57.

The track, "Something with a Ring to It" would later be recorded by Garth Brooks and included as a bonus track on The Chase for The Limited Series and would be included on all later pressings of that album. "Where There's Smoke" was later released as a single by Archer/Park in 1994.

== Critical reception ==
Professional ratings
Review scores
Source	Rating
Allmusic	4.5/5 stars

Giving it 4.5 out of 5 stars, John Floyd of AllMusic wrote that the album "evokes the heart of '50s country, with detailed and compassionate songwriting, wildcat vocals, and guitar by James Burton."

== Track listing ==
No.	Title	Writer(s)	Length
1.	"The Good News and The Bad News"	Mark Collie, Bruce Burch	2:53
2.	"Something With a Ring to It"	Collie, Aaron Tippin	2:30
3.	"Let Her Go"	Collie	2:51
4.	"What I Wouldn't Give"	Burch, Collie, Vip Vipperman	2:59
5.	"Where There's Smoke"	Collie, Bobby Barker	2:36
6.	"Bound to Ramble"	Collie, Michael Gordon, Ronny Scaife	2:30
7.	"Looks Aren't Everything"	Collie	2:54
8.	"Another Old Soldier"	Collie	3:27
9.	"Hardin County Line"	Collie, Scaife	3:26
10.	"Deliver Me"	Collie, Bruce Bouton	3:40
Total length:			29:46

== Personnel ==
From Hardin County Line liner notes.

Musicians

- Eddie Bayers - drums
- Barry Beckett - piano
- James Burton - electric guitar
- The Fairfield Five Singers - background vocals on "What I Wouldn't Give"
- Paul Franklin - steel guitar
- Vince Gill - background vocals
- Mac McAnally - acoustic guitar
- Steve Nathan - organ on "Deliver Me" and "Another Old Soldier"
- Michael Rhodes - bass guitar
- Harry Stinson - background vocals
- Marty Stuart - acoustic guitar on "Hardin County Line"
- Curtis Young - background vocals

Technical

- Milan Bogdan - digital editing
- David Boyer - engineering
- Tony Brown - producer
- Doug Johnson - producer, recording, mixing
- Brad Jones - engineering
- Julian King - engineering
- Tim Kish - engineering
- Linell - engineering
- Glenn Meadows - mastering
- Keith Odle - engineering

== Chart performance ==
Chart (1990)	Peak position
U.S. Billboard Top Country Albums	57
