= Unleashed (Mark Collie album) =

Studio album by Mark Collie
- Released: 1994
- Recorded: Late 1993 at Soundstage Recording, Studios A & B
- Genre: Country
- Length: 38:40
- Label: MCA Records
- Producer: Don Cook

Mark Collie chronology
Mark Collie (1993)	Unleashed (1994)	Tennessee Plates (1995)

Singles from Unleashed
- 1. "Hard Lovin' Woman" Released: August 29, 1994

Unleashed is the fourth studio album by American country music singer-songwriter Mark Collie. It was released in 1994.

The first single from the record, called "It Is No Secret", missed the Top 40 entirely, but the next single, called "Hard Lovin' Woman" peaked at number 13.

It is notable for being his last record before Collie switched to Giant Records, a subsidiary of Warner Bros. Records, that same year.

== Critical reception ==
Professional ratings
Review scores
Source	Rating
AllMusic	3/5 stars

Brian Mansfield of AllMusic rated the album 3 out of 5 stars, saying that it "continued in the vein of Mark Collie."

== Track listing ==
No.	Title	Writer(s)	Length
1.	"Hard Lovin' Woman"	Mark Collie, Don Cook, John Barlow Jarvis	3:19
2.	"It Is No Secret"	Collie, Mike Reid	3:37
3.	"All I Want Is You"	Collie, James House	3:35
4.	"Waiting"	Collie, Even Stevens, Hillary Kanter	4:02
5.	"Ring of Fire"	Merle Kilgore, June Carter	4:24
6.	"Rainy Day Woman"	Collie, Cook, Jarvis	2:51
7.	"When You Belonged To Me"	Collie, Cook, Jarvis	3:38
8.	"God Didn't Make Me That Strong"	Collie, Cook	3:26
9.	"Lonely Streak"	Collie, Deborah Allen, Rafe Van Hoy	4:26
10.	"Unleashed"	Collie, Gary Nicholson	5:22
Total length:			38:40

== Production ==
- Produced By Don Cook
- Recorded & Mixed By Mark J. Capps
- Mastered By Hank Williams

== Personnel ==
- Deborah Allen – background vocals on "Lonely Streak"
- Robert Bailey – background vocals
- Bruce Bouton – steel guitar on "Lonely Streak"
- Mark J. Capps – electric guitar on "Ring of Fire"
- Carlene Carter – vocals on "Ring Of Fire"
- Mark Casstevens – acoustic guitar
- Mark Collie – lead vocals, acoustic guitar
- Paul Franklin – steel guitar
- Rob Hajacos – fiddle
- James House – vocals on "All I Want Is You"
- John Barlow Jarvis – piano, synthesizer, Hammond B-3 organ
- Lorelei McBroom – background vocals
- Brent Mason – electric guitar
- John Wesley Ryles – background vocals
- Suzy Willis – background vocals
- Dennis Wilson – background vocals
- Lonnie Wilson – drums, percussion
- Glenn Worf – bass guitar, upright bass

The Nashville String Machine: Carl Gorodetzky, Pam Sixfin, Lee Larrison, Ted Madsen, Conni Ellisor, Alan Umstead, Dave Davidson, Mary K. Vanosdale, Bob Mason, John Catchings

- Strings Arranged By Dennis Burnside
