= Mark Collie (album) =

Studio album by Mark Collie
- Released: January 5, 1993
- Recorded: 1992
- Studio: Soundshop Recording Studios. Nashville, TN
- Genre: Country
- Length: 33:28
- Label: MCA
- Producer: Don Cook

Mark Collie chronology
Born and Raised in Black & White (1991)	Mark Collie (1993)	Unleashed (1994)

Singles from Mark Collie
- 1. "Even the Man in the Moon Is Cryin'" Released: August 24, 1992; 2. "Born to Love You" Released: January 18, 1993; 3. "Shame Shame Shame Shame" Released: June 5, 1993; 4. "Something's Gonna Change Her Mind" Released: September 18, 1993

Mark Collie is the third studio album by American country music artist Mark Collie. It was released in 1993 by MCA Records. It featured the singles "Even the Man in the Moon Is Cryin'", "Shame Shame Shame Shame", "Born to Love You" and "Something's Gonna Change Her Mind". It peaked at number 38 on the Top Country Albums chart.

== Critical reception ==
Professional ratings
Review scores
Source	Rating
AllMusic	4.5/5 stars

Brian Mansfield of AllMusic gave the record 4.5 out of 5 stars, writing that: "At once a move to the mainstream and a return to Collie's West Tennessee rockabilly roots, the album worked fairly well."

== Track listing ==
No.	Title	Writer(s)	Length
1.	"Trouble's Comin' Like the Train"	Mark Collie, Hillary Kanter, Even Stevens	3:23
2.	"Even the Man in the Moon Is Cryin'"	Collie, Don Cook	3:40
3.	"Shame Shame Shame Shame"	Collie, Jackson Leap	2:55
4.	"Keep It Up"	Deborah Allen, Collie, Rafe Van Hoy	2:51
5.	"Something's Gonna Change Her Mind"	Collie, Cook	3:35
6.	"The Heart of the Matter"	Collie, Cook	2:41
7.	"Born to Love You"	Collie, Cook, Chick Rains	3:09
8.	"Linda Lou"	Collie, Kanter, Stevens	3:20
9.	"Is That Too Much to Ask"	Collie, Cook, John Barlow Jarvis	3:58
10.	"Hillbilly Boy with the Rock and Roll Blues"	Collie, Ronny Scaife	3:56
Total length:			33:28

== Personnel ==
- Mark Collie, Mark Casstevens: acoustic guitar
- Brent Mason, Brian Franklin: electric guitar
- Bruce Bouton: Steel Guitar, slide guitar
- John Barlow Jarvis: keyboards
- Glenn Worf: bass guitar, upright bass
- Lonnie Wilson: drums, percussion
- Mark Collie: vocals
- Deborah Allen, John Wesley Ryles, Harry Stinson, Dennis Wilson: backing vocals

== Production ==
- Produced by Don Cook
- Recorded and mixed by Mike Bradley
- Assistant engineer: Mark Capps
- Mastered by Hank Williams

== Chart performance ==
Chart (1993)	Peak position
U.S. Billboard Top Country Albums	38
U.S. Billboard 200	156
U.S. Billboard Top Heatseekers	6
Canadian RPM Country Albums	8
