= A Man Ain't Made of Stone (song) =

Single by Randy Travis

from the album A Man Ain't Made of Stone
- Released: August 23, 1999
- Genre: Country
- Length: 3:32
- Label: DreamWorks
- Songwriters: Gary Burr, Robin Lerner, Franne Golde
- Producers: Randy Travis, Byron Gallimore, James Stroud

Randy Travis singles chronology
"Stranger in My Mirror" (1999)	"A Man Ain't Made of Stone" (1999)	"Where Can I Surrender" (2000)

"A Man Ain't Made of Stone" is a song written by Gary Burr, Robin Lerner, and Franne Golde, and recorded by American country music artist Randy Travis. It was released in August 1999 as the lead single and title track from his album A Man Ain't Made of Stone. It reached number 16 on the Hot Country Singles & Tracks (now Hot Country Songs) chart and number 24 on the Canadian RPM Country Tracks. It also peaked at number 82 on the U.S. Billboard Hot 100.

== Music video ==
The music video was directed by David Cass and premiered in late 1999. It was filmed in Santa Fe, New Mexico.

== Chart performance ==
"A Man Ain't Made of Stone" debuted at number 68 on the U.S. Billboard Hot Country Singles & Tracks for the week of August 14, 1999.

Chart (1999)	Peak position
Canada Country Singles (RPM)	24
US Billboard Hot 100	82
US Hot Country Songs (Billboard)	16
