= Looks Aren't Everything =

Single by Mark Collie

from the album Hardin County Line
- B-side: "Something with a Ring to It"
- Released: June 9, 1990
- Genre: Country
- Length: 2:56
- Label: MCA
- Songwriter(s): Mark Collie
- Producer(s): Doug Johnson, Tony Brown

Mark Collie singles chronology
| "Something with a Ring to It" (1990) | "Looks Aren't Everything" (1990) | "Hardin County Line" (1990) |

"Looks Aren't Everything" is a song written and recorded by American country music artist Mark Collie. It was released in June 1990 as the second single from the album Hardin County Line. The song reached #35 on the Billboard Hot Country Singles & Tracks chart.

== Chart performance ==
| Chart (1990) | Peak position |
|---|---|
| US Hot Country Songs (Billboard) | 35 |
| Canadian RPM Country Tracks | 28 |
