= Even the Man in the Moon Is Cryin' =

Single by Mark Collie

from the album Mark Collie
- B-side: "Trouble's Coming Like a Train"
- Released: August 24, 1992
- Genre: Country
- Length: 3:41
- Label: MCA
- Songwriters: Mark Collie, Don Cook
- Producer: Don Cook

Mark Collie singles chronology
| "It Don't Take a Lot" (1992) | "Even the Man in the Moon Is Cryin'" (1992) | "Born to Love You" (1993) |

"Even the Man in the Moon Is Cryin'" is a song co-written and recorded by American country music artist Mark Collie. It was released in August 1992 as the first single from the album Mark Collie. The song reached number 5 on the U.S. Billboard Hot Country Singles & Tracks chart and peaked at number 11 on the Canadian RPM Country Tracks chart. Collie wrote the song with Don Cook.

== Content ==
The song is a ballad, in which the narrator explains that he is upset because his lover has left him.

== Critical reception ==
Deborah Evans Price, of Billboard magazine gave the song a favorable review, calling it a "praiseworthy delivery of a progressively written ballad." She goes on to call it "infectious and believable."

== Music video ==
The music video was directed by John Lloyd Miller and premiered in late 1992.

== Chart performance ==
| Chart (1992) | Peak position |
|---|---|
| Canada Country Singles (RPM) | 11 |
| US Hot Country Songs (Billboard) | 5 |

=== Year-end charts ===
| Chart (1992) | Position |
|---|---|
| Canada Country Tracks (RPM) | 99 |
