= When a Man Loves (disambiguation) =

When a Man Loves may refer to:

- When a Man Loves (1911 film), see Mary Pickford filmography § Biograph (1911)
- When a Man Loves (1919 film), starring Earle Williams, Tom Guise and Margaret Loomis
- When a Man Loves (1927 film), starring John Barrymore
- When a Man Loves (2013 TV series)

== See also ==
- When a Man Loves a Woman (disambiguation)
