= She's Never Comin' Back =

Single by Mark Collie

from the album Born and Raised in Black & White
- B-side: "Lucky Dog"
- Released: October 26, 1991
- Genre: Country
- Length: 2:52
- Label: MCA
- Songwriter(s): Mark Collie, Gerry House
- Producer(s): Doug Johnson, Tony Brown

Mark Collie singles chronology
"Calloused Hands" (1991)	"She's Never Comin' Back" (1991)	"It Don't Take a Lot" (1992)

"She's Never Comin' Back" is a song co-written and recorded by American country music artist Mark Collie. It was released in October 1991 as the second single from the album Born and Raised in Black & White. The song reached number 28 on the Billboard Hot Country Singles & Tracks chart. The song was written by Collie and Gerry House.

== Chart performance ==
Chart (1991–1992)	Peak position
US Hot Country Songs (Billboard)	28
Canadian RPM Country Tracks	38
