= House Foundation =

The House Foundation
- Genre: Comedy, Talk, Country
- Running time: 4 hours
- Country of origin: United States
- Home station: WSIX-FM
- Starring: Gerry House; Mike Bohan; Al Voecks; Duncan Stewart; Richard Falklen
- Created by: Gerry House
- Written by: Gerry House
- Executive producer: Gerry House
- Original release: 1983 – 2010
- Website: The House Foundation (Redirects to WSIX Home Page)

The House Foundation was the morning show at Nashville's WSIX-FM radio station.

== History ==
=== Beginnings ===
In the early 80s, WSIX-FM started a morning show that featured veteran disc jockey and songwriter Gerry House as the host. Al Voecks had presented a talk show on the AM station, and he soon became House's news man. Duncan Stewart came to Nashville from Boston in 1983, through a friendship with the music director at WSIX-FM, and he soon became House's Sports guy.

Completing the foundation was Paul Randall, who began as a traffic reporter and he soon became House's co-presenter or 'sidekick'. While Voecks and Stewart came in every half hour to do news and sports, Randall stuck around for the whole show and played off House.

=== Hiatus ===
The first run of the 'House Foundation' ended in 1985 when Gerry left for WSIX's competitors, WSM, citing politics within the company as the reason. Soon thereafter, he moved to California as an on-air personality for KLAC

=== Return ===
After a successful time in California on radio and writing for Television, Gerry cited personal reasons for a return to Nashville. WSIX's new owner, Steve Hicks, soon offered House his job back and even agreed to a complete 'House Foundation' reunion that would see House return to the air with Voecks, Stewart and Randall all in their original roles. Devon O'Day also joined the show as producer and for a Country news segment at 9.45 called 'Twang Talk'.

=== Loss of Paul Randall ===
Tragedy would strike when House Foundation member Paul Randall became very ill. Mike Bohan joined the show in 1995 after 20 years at WSMV. Randall succumbed to his illness in 1998 and Gerry finds it hard to speak of his late friend now.

=== Today ===
Randall's sidekick role was filled by Mike Bohan, former weatherman for WSMV-TV. Recently Richard Falklen joined the team as a replacement for Devon O'Day and hosts the news segment once named 'Twang Talk'. Falklen's 'disembodied voice', as Gerry calls it, can often be heard through the studio intercom during the show whenever he adds input.

Al Voecks and Duncan Stewart's contracts were not renewed by WSIX and they ended being with the show in Dec. 2009 and many listeners were saddened by their departure. Gerry stated to them on their last day that the show would not be the same without them.

=== The End ===
On Friday, September 3, 2010, Gerry announced in the last few minutes of the show that the House Foundation would be dissolving and that their last broadcast will be on December 15, 2010. Gerry stopped short of calling it a retirement and made no characterization as to whether or not the decision was solely his — instead stating that "no one is mad at anyone" and that the timing "feels right". A press release issued to local media immediately after the announcement said that Gerry will continue to contribute to WSIX as a writer, adviser, and "consigliere".

== Format ==
The House Foundation follows a traditional morning show format, eschewing sequential song play for information and discussion. Generally, in any given segment of the show, there will be one top charting country music song, a time of discussion among the hosts and/or listeners, and a series of commercials. In addition, there are traffic/weather/news/sports blocks interspersed with commercial messages.

== Guests ==
=== Fictional Gerry House Characters ===
House pre-tapes many of the comedy bits played throughout the show, using his own voice and stock music.

Homer
By far, the most prevalent fictional voice on the show, Homer voices the shows opening and many of the station identification spots. House often sets up jokes with the Homer character, and will sometimes dialogue with his pre-recorded banter.
Makk Trukk
Accompanied by Battle Hymn of the Republic, this character gives a comedic political commentary.
Mayor/Governor Phil Bredesen
House imitates the politician, usually repeating the recognizable phrase, "and... hello..."
Maurice
This African-American sportscaster often lampoons local sports team achievements or non-achievements. House originated the character while he was in Los Angeles originally for the Los Angeles Lakers.

=== Live Guests ===
House generally does not have live guests on his show, but will from time-to-time feature country music stars local politicians and local celebrities. Many country stars do listen to his show either locally or on satellite radio, and will often call in unsolicited. Occasionally, House will bait a star to call in on the air with mixed results. There is an unpublished phone number that House provides to entertainers so that they do not have to be queued with the general public.

== Regular Features ==
=== Show Segments ===
House determines the overall direction of the show, sticking with a fairly regular template each morning. Certain portions of the show are designed to solicit input from listeners, and often House will direct the conversation to current events both in news and entertainment. House is very adept at structuring conversations to be informative and humorous at the same time. Almost always, the music played is country, and House almost always tells a caller, when requesting a "devil rock-and-roll" (as he puts it) song, to "Get off the phone!" However, in some cases (such as when a 13-year-old boy named Noah called, requesting the song Bad Day, and House was so taken by Noah's enthusiasm (though he did wait until Noah hung up before he told Bohan to find it)) House will play a non-country song.

==== Daily ====
Cornpone Canker
House, using the name "Cornpone Canker", will play a new country song and solicit callers to rate it on a scale of one to ten. Cornpone will take around a dozen calls each day during the segment, and Bohan will average the results.
Shout out to the host
Toward the end of the 7:00 hour, House chooses a classic country song to play with the primary intention to allow listeners to lavish praise on him for his choice. Listeners call in and "give a shout out" to House about how much they like the song. House self-depracatingly acknowledges their calls. Occasionally, House will choose a song based on current events that may or may not be within the country genre. Usually this creates more intense reactions from his listeners, both negative and positive.
Things you would have heard, had you been listening
During the 9:00 hour, House recaps many of the punchlines used in the day's show. Often the result is unintentionally hilarious, even without hearing the setups for the jokes.

==== Weekly ====
What are you doin'?
Friday mornings prior to 7:00 a.m., House will ask his audience to call in with their weekend plans so that the team can "live vigorously [vicariously]" through them. House improvs off each phone call. He typically says "What's a-haappenin'?"

=== Comedy Bumpers ===
Throughout the show, House will insert pre-recorded short comedy segments that he creates at his studio House Notes. Several segments are long-running, where the general framework of the comedy bit stays the same, but the content changes, sometimes based on current events.

The New Opry
Since The Grand Ole Opry runs on a competitor station in Nashville (and for a period of time ran paid advertisements on the House Foundation), House created a bit that is a false ad for The New Opry. Touting itself as an improvement on "the old one", the ad lists a lineup of unlikely performers including "_______ Herlihey" and "the ________ sisters" where the blank spot changes each time. Other "new Opry" lampoons include Billy Gilman, Nashville/Tennessee politicians and various non-country stars.

=== Daily Contests ===
Daily contests occur at regular times each day during the show. House announces the call-in number and the audience is invited to call to compete. A caller is chosen at random to participate. The sole prize for the winner is $50. House generally does everything he can to help the caller win the contest, and has been known to award the prize even when the caller is incorrect, or has to guess several times to get the answer. Winning answers are accompanied by a stock cheering sound effect.

You Be the Judge
Liar's Club

=== Special Contests ===
Whenever there is a major prize given away on the House Foundation, the contest usually includes some sort of complex trivia question, nonsense phrase or guessing game that lasts for almost the entire show. Like most radio stations, major prize contests usually occur on Thursdays during sweeps.

== Featured Commercial Sponsors ==
House's show is sponsored by local and national companies. Certain featured sponsors receive regular advertising times when their commercial spot is broadcast. Some sponsors appear on the show themselves, either in pre-taped or participatory segments that feature extemporaneous improvisation with House. Other sponsors elect to have House Foundation members voice their spots in testimonials.

One interesting aspect of the majority of the phoned in advertisements - the sponsors seem to be coached to agree with everything that Gerry says, applying a basic rule of improvisational comedy.

=== Gerry House Spots ===
- Voiced live by House alone
  - 7:30 a.m. daily - Hunter's Custom Automotive - This ad generally has the same copy each time, so House reads it each time in a different inflection, imitation and accent, adding in ad libs based on popular music or current events.
- Improvised live spots with sponsors
  - Daily - Worthington Mortgage - House dialogues by phone with Will Worthington, owner of the company, who promotes his company's low interest rates and online applications. Most days, House will segue out of the discussion and make an oblique ironic connection between whatever the previous topic was and home mortgages. In addition, House will take the opportunity to make a veiled insult to Mike Bohan for not refinancing his mortgage to a lower interest rate.
  - Weekly - Fluffo Mattress - House talks by phone with Horace Bass of Nashville-based Fluffo Mattress Company. The discussion invariably turns to the languid tones of Horace. In the event that Bass does not call in for the commercial, House infers that proves the quality of the product, because he must be asleep on his Fluffo.
  - Weekly - Kroger Image Express - House talks by phone with a representative from Kroger's photo service about specials that they are running, often asking inappropriate questions.
  - Weekly - LAVE M.D. - House talks by phone with a doctor from Nashville's Laser and Vein Aesthetics.

=== Mike Bohan Spots ===
Frequently, Bohan will voice a five to ten second live spot prior to his weather report. Many times, House will interrupt and try to throw him off script

- Voiced live by Bohan alone
  - Ming Wang - Nashville Lasik surgeon
  - The Tennessean - often features a tease of the day's stories
- Voiced pre-recorded by Bohan alone
  - Dunkin Donuts

=== Duncan Stewart Spots ===
- Voiced pre-recorded by Stewart alone
  - Shane Co.
  - (former sponsor) Krystal

== Running Gags ==
Many of the comedic elements of the show are recurrent and understandable at first hearing. Some of the show's jokes have stemmed from topical discussions, and others are based on malapropisms that have occurred on the show.

=== Jokes ===
Many of the long-running jokes on the show are pre-written or developed through improvisation.

Call if you...
Whenever the discussion on a specific topic gets out of hand, House will interrupt the conversation with the "Call if you..." question requesting calls from listeners who espouse a position that is a ludicrous characterization of the topic being discussed.
How did we get so late?
Many times, the discussion on topics extends beyond the scheduled timeframe, delaying the scheduled news broadcast by a number of minutes. Usually, when trying to get the show back on track, House will incredulously ask, "how did we get so late?" and then invite the audience to call to discuss why they're late... which of course, would make them later... which, of course was how they got in the predicament in the first place.
I'm _____, and I'm _____
House will come back from break many times introducing himself as a famous character with the expectation that Bohan will finish the well-known pairing, usually with embarrassing results to Bohan.
Shut 'er Down!
Often when Voecks is reading a news story about a plant closing, the end of a political campaign or other stopping, House will yell off-mike "Shut 'er Down!" in an odd voice.
The Squirrel! (followed by a Squirrel imitation)
When primary competitor WSM-FM adopted a new station mascot of "The Wolf", House protested 98's lack of an animal mascot and suggested they be known as "The Squirrel."

=== Inside Jokes ===
The House Foundation has myriad inside jokes, most deriving from spontaneous improvisation between House and the various other members of the team. Sometimes these jokes require extensive listening to more fully appreciate their humor.

Bohan(-ing)
House's sidekick Mike Bohan is known for his frugality and frequent use of station marketing opportunities to receive free goods and services. For that reason, House has chosen to turn his name into a verb to describe this act.

Examples:

When I went to the restaurant on its opening night, I Bohanned a meal from them.
I have a friend who works for the theater, so I Bohanned these tickets from him.

Our eight listeners
House jokes that his show is so unpopular that they only have eight listeners, and to lose any of them would be catastrophic. Many people will call in and refer to themselves as "one of the eight."
Stewart or Voecks Drinking
House jokes about Stewart and Voecks's ability to consume adult beverages.
The UPS Man
House infers frequently that his wife is having an affair with the UPS driver that services his house. He often cites made up "evidence" to this. The gag stemmed from a commentary on the amount of mail-ordering that his wife does.
Voecks's age
Because he is the most senior of the team, House often jokes obliquely about Voecks's age, inferring that he is multiple hundreds of years old.

== The Best of the House Foundation ==
When House is away on vacation or ill, Chris Romer presents "The Best Of The House Foundation". Generally, the ratio of music to other material is increased greatly in this format, but usually with some "best of" material between songs: averaging 7-8 bits per hour.

The Best of the House Foundation also aired on Saturdays...and 5-6am weekdays.
