= The Hole (song) =

Single by Randy Travis

from the album You and You Alone
- B-side: "Satisfied Mind"
- Released: June 4, 1998
- Recorded: 1998
- Genre: Country
- Length: 3:08
- Label: DreamWorks 59010
- Songwriters: Skip Ewing, James Dean Hicks
- Producers: James Stroud, Byron Gallimore, Randy Travis

Randy Travis singles chronology
"Out of My Bones" (1998)	"The Hole" (1998)	"Spirit of a Boy, Wisdom of a Man" (1998)

"The Hole" is a song written by Skip Ewing and James Dean Hicks, and recorded by American country music singer Randy Travis. It was released in June 1998 as the second single from his album You and You Alone. It peaked at number 9 on the Hot Country Singles & Tracks (now Hot Country Songs) chart, and number 4 in Canada.

== Background ==
Co-producer James Stroud told Billboard Magazine that when Randy went to sing the song for the first time in front of a room full of Nashville players, "his voice just filled the room. And when we stopped, these great professional musicians stood up and gave him a standing ovation. I have never seen that done in this town before. Never."

== Content ==
"The Hole" is a song describing a man who is burdened by his sins, which are compared to a hole in the ground. He is described as digging the hole deeper in a futile attempt to get out: "Now he won't let go of the shovel, and he can't dig out of the hole."

== Music video ==
The music video was directed by Joe Murray, who also directed Randy Travis's previous video "Out of My Bones".

== Use in media ==
The song was featured in the 1998 movie Deep Impact.

== Chart performance ==
"The Hole" debuted at number 72 on the U.S. Billboard Hot Country Singles & Tracks for the week of June 13, 1998.

Chart (1998)	Peak position
Canada Country Singles (RPM)	4
US Bubbling Under Hot 100 (Billboard)	5
US Hot Country Songs (Billboard)	9

=== Year-end charts ===
Chart (1998)	Position
Canada Country Tracks (RPM)	46
US Country Songs (Billboard)	63
