= Something's Gonna Change Her Mind =

Single by Mark Collie

from the album Mark Collie
- B-side: "Linda Lou"
- Released: September 18, 1993
- Genre: Country
- Length: 3:35
- Label: MCA
- Songwriter(s): Mark Collie, Don Cook
- Producer(s): Don Cook

Mark Collie singles chronology
"Shame Shame Shame Shame" (1993)	"Something's Gonna Change Her Mind" (1993)	"It Is No Secret" (1994)

"Something's Gonna Change Her Mind" is a song co-written and recorded by American country music artist Mark Collie. It was released in September 1993 as the fourth single from the album Mark Collie. The song reached #24 on the Billboard Hot Country Singles & Tracks chart. The song was written by Collie and Don Cook.

== Chart performance ==
Chart (1993)	Peak position
US Hot Country Songs (Billboard)	24
Canadian RPM Country Tracks	21
