= Hard Lovin' Woman =

Single by Mark Collie

from the album Unleashed
- B-side: "Ring of Fire"
- Released: August 29, 1994
- Genre: Country
- Length: 3:20
- Label: MCA
- Songwriters: Mark Collie; Don Cook; John Barlow Jarvis
- Producer: Don Cook

Mark Collie singles chronology
"God Didn't Make Me That Strong" (1994)	"Hard Lovin' Woman" (1994)	"Three Words, Two Hearts, One Night" (1995)

"Hard Lovin' Woman" is a song co-written and recorded by American country music artist Mark Collie. It was released in August 1994 as the third and final single from the album Unleashed. The song reached number 13 on the Billboard Hot Country Singles & Tracks chart and number 9 in Canada. Collie wrote the song with John Barlow Jarvis and Don Cook.

== Content ==
The song tells a love story between two high-schoolers, Bobby and Suzie. Bobby is described as "hard-headed". Suzie wants to go out with Bobby, but her over-protective father forbids her from doing so. She is upset and tells her mother that the father does not understand her feelings for Bobby. The mother responds by saying "It takes a hard lovin' woman to love a hard-headed man," suggesting that the father is also "hard-headed".

Bobby is working at a gas station to buy a diamond ring after graduation. Suzie's father comes by for gas and water, and warns Bobby to stay away from Suzie. However, that night, he sneaks Suzie out of her room. Her mother sees the couple drive off, but doesn't wake up her father.

Eventually, Bobby and Suzie marry, and even Suzie's father attends the ceremony.

== Music video ==
The music video was directed by John Lloyd Miller and premiered in early 1995.

== Chart performance ==
Chart (1994–1995)	Peak position
Canada Country Singles (RPM)	9
US Hot Country Songs (Billboard)	13
