= Take These Chains from My Heart =

1952 song by Fred Rose and Hy Heath

Single by Hank Williams with his Drifting Cowboys
- A-side: "Ramblin' Man"
- Published: October 31, 1952 Acuff-Rose Publications
- Released: April 1953
- Recorded: September 23, 1952
- Studio: Castle Studio, Nashville
- Genre: Country, honky-tonk, country blues
- Length: 2:35
- Label: MGM 11479
- Songwriters: Hy Heath, Fred Rose
- Producer: Fred Rose

Hank Williams with his Drifting Cowboys singles chronology
"Kaw-Liga" (1953)	"Take These Chains from My Heart" (1953)	"I Won't Be Home No More" (1953)

"Take These Chains from My Heart"

Single by Ray Charles

from the album Modern Sounds in Country and Western Music, Volume Two
- B-side: "No Letter Today"
- Released: March 25, 1963
- Recorded: 1963
- Genre: Rhythm and blues
- Length: 2:51
- Label: ABC-Paramount
- Songwriters: Hy Heath, Fred Rose
- Producer: Sid Feller

Ray Charles singles chronology
"The Brightest Smile in Town" (1963)	"Take These Chains from My Heart" (1963)	"No Letter Today" (1963)

"Take These Chains from My Heart"

Single by Lee Roy Parnell

from the album On the Road
- B-side: "Straight Shooter"
- Released: May 21, 1994
- Genre: Country
- Length: 3:22
- Label: Arista Nashville
- Songwriters: Hy Heath, Fred Rose
- Producer: Scott Hendricks

Lee Roy Parnell singles chronology
"I'm Holding My Own" (1994)	"Take These Chains from My Heart" (1994)	"The Power of Love" (1994)

"Take These Chains from My Heart" is a song by Hank Williams. It was written by Fred Rose and Hy Heath and was recorded at Williams' final recording session on September 23, 1952, in Nashville. The song has been widely praised; Williams' biographer Colin Escott deems it "perhaps the best song [Rose] ever presented to Hank...It was one of the very few songs that sounded somewhat similar to a Hank Williams song." Williams is backed by Tommy Jackson (fiddle), Don Helms (steel guitar), Chet Atkins (lead guitar), Jack Shook (rhythm guitar), and Floyd "Lightnin'" Chance (bass). In the wake of Williams' death on New Year's Day, 1953, the song shot to number one, his final chart-topping hit for MGM Records. Like "Your Cheatin' Heart," the song's theme of despair, so vividly articulated by Williams' typically impassioned singing, reinforced the image of Hank as a tortured, mythic figure.

== Cover versions ==
- Tommy Edwards recorded the song for MGM in 1953.
- Jack Scott recorded this song on an album in 1960.
- Kitty Wells released the song on Decca in 1962.
- Pianist Floyd Cramer recorded an instrumental version of the song in 1962.
- George Jones recorded the song for his 1962 LP My Favorites of Hank Williams.
- Ray Charles (October 1962) placed it on the album Modern Sounds in Country and Western Music Volume Two. The song peaked at number eight on the Billboard Hot 100 and number seven on the rhythm and blues singles chart and at number five in the UK charts in 1963.
- Bill Anderson cut the song for Decca in 1963.
- Grant Green (jazz guitarist) recorded the song for Blue Note Records in 1963 at Rudy Van Gelder studios.
- Al Martino's 1963 version was included on the album I Love You Because.
- Carl Smith recorded the song for Columbia Records.
- Dean Martin recorded the song for his 1965 album (Remember Me) I'm the One Who Loves You.
- Williams' hero Roy Acuff recorded it in 1966 for Hickory.
- Conway Twitty covered the song for Decca.
- Dottie West recorded it in 1968.
- Marty Robbins performed it with Chet Atkins on Marty's TV show 1968.
- Williams' idol, Ernest Tubb, cut the song in 1968.
- Stonewall Jackson (musician) released the song on Columbia in 1969.
- Jerry Lee Lewis performed the song on his 1970 album Live at the International, Las Vegas.
- Don Gibson recorded the song for RCA in 1971.
- Glen Campbell included the song on his 1973 LP I Remember Hank Williams.
- Johnny McEvoy cut the song in 1974.
- Sonny James recorded the song for Columbia in 1974.
- Charlie Rich recorded it in 1974.
- Dolly Parton performed it on her TV show in 1976.
- Boxcar Willie performed it in a medley of Hank Williams songs in his concert show.
- Little Willie Littlefield recorded a version for his 1990 album Singalong with Little Willie Littlefield.
- Lee Roy Parnell covered the song on his album On the Road, with a guest vocal from Ronnie Dunn of Brooks & Dunn. Parnell's version peaked at number 17 on the Billboard Hot Country Singles & Tracks chart.
- The song appears on the 1997 album The Ghost of Hank Williams by David Allan Coe.
- Merle Haggard covered the song on his 2001 album Roots, Volume 1.
- Canadian singer Anne Murray covered the song in 2002.
- Martina McBride recorded the song for her 2005 album 'Timeless.
- The Kentucky Headhunters included the song on their 2005 album Big Boss Man.
- Rosanne Cash included the song on her 2009 album The List.
- The song appears on Lacy J. Dalton's 2010 tribute album Here's to Hank.
- Madeleine Peyroux (2013) covered it on the album The Blue Room.
- Daniel O'Donnell performed it in 2015.

== Chart performance ==
=== Lee Roy Parnell ===
Chart (1994)	Peak position
Canada Country Singles (RPM)	21
US Hot Country Songs (Billboard)	17

== Bibliography ==
- Escott, Colin; Merritt, George; MacEwen, William (2004). Hank Williams: The Biography. New York: Little, Brown.
