= We All Get Lucky Sometimes =

Studio album by Lee Roy Parnell
- Released: August 1, 1995
- Genre: Country
- Length: 39:19
- Label: Career
- Producer: Bill Halverson; Scott Hendricks; Lee Roy Parnell

Lee Roy Parnell chronology
On the Road (1993)	We All Get Lucky Sometimes (1995)	Every Night's a Saturday Night (1997)

Singles from Love Without Mercy
- 1. "A Little Bit of You" Released: May 8, 1995; 2. "When a Woman Loves a Man" Released: August 28, 1995; 3. "Heart's Desire" Released: January 15, 1996; 4. "Givin' Water to a Drowning Man" Released: May 6, 1996

Professional ratings
Review scores
Source	Rating
AllMusic	3/5 stars
Entertainment Weekly	B−

We All Get Lucky Sometimes is the fourth studio album by American country music singer Lee Roy Parnell. It was released in 1995 as his first album for Career Records, a sister label of Arista Nashville. This album produced five singles for him on the Billboard country singles charts. "A Little Bit of You" was the first, at No. 2, followed by "When a Woman Loves a Man" (No. 12), "Heart's Desire" (No. 3), "Givin' Water to a Drowning Man" (No. 12), and the title track (No. 46). It is also his highest-peaking album on Top Country Albums, peaking at No. 26 there.

"Squeeze Me In" was covered by Garth Brooks as a duet with Trisha Yearwood on his 2001 album Scarecrow, from which it was released as a single in 2002. The final track, "Catwalk", is an instrumental featuring accordionist Flaco Jiménez.

== Track listing ==
No.	Title	Writer(s)	Length
1.	"A Little Bit of You"	Trey Bruce, Craig Wiseman	2:41
2.	"Knock Yourself Out"	Lee Roy Parnell, Gary Nicholson	3:07
3.	"Heart's Desire"	Parnell, Cris Moore	4:13
4.	"When a Woman Loves a Man"	Rafe Van Hoy, Mark Luna	3:44
5.	"If the House Is Rockin'"	Nicholson, Mike Henderson, Wally Wilson	3:28
6.	"We All Get Lucky Sometimes"	Nicholson, Jimmy Scott	3:18
7.	"Saved by the Grace of Your Love"	Parnell, Mike Reid	3:29
8.	"Givin' Water to a Drowning Man"	Nicholson, Parnell	3:30
9.	"I Had to Let It Go"	Parnell, Will Jennings	3:55
10.	"Squeeze Me In"	Nicholson, Delbert McClinton	2:55
11.	"Cat Walk"	Parnell, Flaco Jiménez	4:59

== Personnel ==
The Hot Links

- Kevin McKendree - piano (4, 5, 10)
- Steve Mackey - bass guitar
- Lee Roy Parnell - Dobro, electric guitar, lead guitar, slide guitar, lead vocals (1–10)
- James Pennebaker - fiddle, electric guitar, rhythm guitar, mandolin
- Lynn Williams - drums

Additional musicians

- Trey Bruce - choir (2)
- Mary Chapin Carpenter - background vocals (6)
- Steve Conn - accordion (9)
- Dan Dugmore - steel guitar
- Chris Egan - choir (2)
- Scott Hendricks - choir (2)
- Flaco Jiménez - accordion (11)
- John Kunz - choir (2)
- Jonell Mosser - background vocals (1–3, 5, 7–10)
- Rob Roy Parnell - harmonica (5)
- Mike Reid - electric piano (7)
- John Wesley Ryles - background vocals (1–3, 5, 7–10)
- Michael Spriggs - acoustic guitar (1–10)
- Dennis Wilson - background vocals (1–3, 5, 7–10)
- Reese Wynans - keyboards (11), organ (1–10), piano (1–3, 6–9)
- Trisha Yearwood - background vocals (4)
- Joe Zaukus - choir (2)

== Chart performance ==
Chart (1995)	Peak position
U.S. Billboard Top Country Albums	26
U.S. Billboard 200	173
U.S. Billboard Top Heatseekers	10
