= Shame Shame Shame Shame =

Single by Mark Collie

from the album Mark Collie
- B-side: "Keep It Up"
- Released: June 5, 1993
- Genre: Country
- Length: 2:57
- Label: MCA
- Songwriter(s): Mark Collie, Jackson Leap
- Producer(s): Don Cook

Mark Collie singles chronology
"Born to Love You" (1993)	"Shame Shame Shame Shame" (1993)	"Something's Gonna Change Her Mind" (1993)

"Shame Shame Shame Shame" is a song co-written and recorded by American country music artist Mark Collie. It was released in June 1993 as the third single from the album Mark Collie. The song reached #26 on the Billboard Hot Country Singles & Tracks chart. The song was written by Collie and Jackson Leap.

== Chart performance ==
Chart (1993)	Peak position
US Hot Country Songs (Billboard)	26
Canadian RPM Country Tracks	45
