= Out of My Bones =

Single by Randy Travis

from the album You and You Alone
- B-side: "Brinks Truck"
- Released: March 2, 1998
- Recorded: 1998
- Genre: Country
- Length: 2:45
- Label: DreamWorks 59007
- Songwriters: Gary Burr, Robin Lerner, Sharon Vaughn
- Producers: James Stroud, Byron Gallimore, Randy Travis

Randy Travis singles chronology
| "Price to Pay" (1997) | "Out of My Bones" (1998) | "The Hole" (1998) |

"Out of My Bones" is a song recorded by American country music singer Randy Travis. It was released in March 1998 as the lead-off single from his CD You and You Alone. The song peaked at number two on the Hot Country Singles & Tracks (now Hot Country Songs) chart, while it was a number-one hit in Canada. It was written by Gary Burr, Robin Lerner, and Sharon Vaughn.

== Content ==
The narrator is having a hard time forgetting a lost love. He describes what he can do to get her memory "out of his bones" including wishing he had amnesia.

== Critical reception ==
Deborah Evans Price, of Billboard magazine reviewed the song favorably, calling his vocal performance "powerful" and saying that the production is "full but not overblown." She goes on to say that the record should "remind programmers that the warmth and feeling in Travis' country baritone are among the format's most precious treasures."

== Chart performance ==
| Chart (1998) | Peak position |
|---|---|
| Canada Country Singles (RPM) | 1 |
| US Billboard Hot 100 | 64 |
| US Hot Country Songs (Billboard) | 2 |

=== Year-end charts ===
| Chart (1998) | Position |
|---|---|
| Canada Country Tracks (RPM) | 25 |
| US Country Songs (Billboard) | 27 |
