= Stranger in My Mirror =

Single by Randy Travis

from the album You and You Alone
- Released: March 1, 1999
- Genre: Country
- Length: 3:15
- Label: DreamWorks
- Songwriters: Skip Ewing, Kim Williams
- Producers: Randy Travis, Byron Gallimore, James Stroud

Randy Travis singles chronology
"Spirit of a Boy, Wisdom of a Man" (1998)	"Stranger in My Mirror" (1999)	"A Man Ain't Made of Stone" (1999)

"Stranger in My Mirror" is a song written by Skip Ewing and Kim Williams, and recorded by American country music artist Randy Travis. It was released in March 1999 as the fourth and final single from his album You and You Alone. It peaked at number 16 on the Hot Country Singles & Tracks (now Hot Country Songs) chart and at number 20 on the Canadian RPM Country Tracks chart.

== Chart performance ==
"Stranger in My Mirror" debuted at number 61 on the U.S. Billboard Hot Country Singles & Tracks for the week of March 6, 1999.

Chart (1999)	Peak position
Canada Country Singles (RPM)	20
US Billboard Hot 100	81
US Hot Country Songs (Billboard)	16
