= On the Road (Lee Roy Parnell album) =

Studio album by Lee Roy Parnell
- Released: October 26, 1993
- Recorded: Soundshop Recording Studios (Nashville), Midtown Tone & Volume and Recording Arts (Nashville) & The Castle Recording Studios (Franklin, TN)
- Genre: Country
- Length: 38:50
- Label: Arista Nashville
- Producer: Scott Hendricks

Lee Roy Parnell chronology
Love Without Mercy (1992)	On the Road (1993)	We All Get Lucky Sometimes (1995)

Singles from On the Road
- 1. "On the Road" Released: August 9, 1993; 2. "I'm Holding My Own" Released: January 3, 1994; 3. "Take These Chains from My Heart" Released: May 21, 1994

Professional ratings
Review scores
Source	Rating
AllMusic	3/5 stars
Entertainment Weekly	B+

On the Road is the third studio album by American country music singer Lee Roy Parnell. It was released October 26, 1993 via Arista Nashville. The album produced four singles for Parnell, all of which charted on Billboard Hot Country Songs: the title track at No. 6, "I'm Holding My Own" at No. 3, a cover of the Hank Williams song "Take These Chains from My Heart" at No. 17, and "The Power of Love" at No. 51.

== Track listing ==
No.	Title	Writer(s)	Length
1.	"On the Road"	Bob McDill	4:38
2.	"Country Down to My Soul"	Lee Roy Parnell, Cris Moore	3:11
3.	"The Power of Love"	Don Cook, Gary Nicholson	3:39
4.	"I'm Holding My Own"	Tony Arata	4:16
5.	"They Don't Know You"	Parnell, Nicholson	3:42
6.	"Straight Shooter"	Parnell, Nicholson	4:43
7.	"Take These Chains from My Heart"	Fred Rose, Hy Heath	3:22
8.	"Wasted Time"	Parnell, Nicholson	4:50
9.	"Straight and Narrow"	Parnell, Tony Haselden	3:31
10.	"Fresh Coat of Paint"	Parnell, Rory Bourke, Moore	2:54

== Production ==
- Produced and mixed by Scott Hendricks
- Engineered by Scott Hendricks, John Kunz, and Mark Capps
- Mastered by Hank Williams
- Project assistant: John Kunz
- Project administrator: Ramona Simmons

== Personnel ==
- Drums: Lonnie Wilson
- Congas, cymbals: Terry McMillan
- Bass guitar: Glenn Worf
- Piano, Wurlitzer: John Barlow Jarvis
- Hammond organ: Reese Wynans
- Acoustic guitar: Billy Joe Walker Jr.
- Electric guitar: Lee Roy Parnell, John Jorgenson, James Pennebaker
- Slide guitar: Lee Roy Parnell
- Steel guitar: Dan Dugmore
- Mandolin: John Jorgenson
- Harmonica: Rob Parnell
- Lead vocals: Lee Roy Parnell
- Backing vocals: Joy Lynn White, Jonell Mosser, Jimmy Hall, Steve Mackey, Russell Smith, Dennis Wilson, Harry Stinson
- Guest vocals: Ronnie Dunn on "Take These Chains from My Heart"

== Charts ==
Chart (1993)	Peak position
U.S. Billboard Top Country Albums	59
U.S. Billboard Top Heatseekers	23
Canadian RPM Country Albums	17
