= I'm Holding My Own =

Single by Lee Roy Parnell

from the album On the Road
- B-side: "Fresh Coat of Paint"
- Released: January 3, 1994
- Genre: Country
- Length: 4:16
- Label: Arista
- Songwriter: Tony Arata
- Producer: Scott Hendricks

Lee Roy Parnell singles chronology
| "On the Road" (1993) | "I'm Holding My Own" (1994) | "Take These Chains from My Heart" (1994) |

"I'm Holding My Own" is a song written by Tony Arata, and recorded by American country music singer Lee Roy Parnell. It was released in January 1994 as the second single from his album On the Road. The song spent 20 weeks on the Hot Country Songs charts, peaking at number three in 1994.

== Content ==
The narrator runs into his ex-lover on the street and they talk about how they have been doing since the breakup. The narrator seems to indicate that he is doing alright by saying "I'm holding my own" in a figurative sense of 'surviving'. The woman then states there is a chance for them to get back together, although she is already with another man. This causes the narrator to clarify that he is not single, but is in fact "holding" his own lover and has no desire to be unfaithful to his current girlfriend.

== Music video ==
The music video was directed by Michael Oblowitz and premiered in early 1994. The video was filmed in and around New York City.

== Chart performance ==
"I'm Holding My Own" debuted at number 71 on the U.S. Billboard Hot Country Singles & Tracks for the week of January 8, 1994.

| Chart (1994) | Peak position |
|---|---|
| Canada Country Singles (RPM) | 2 |
| US Hot Country Songs (Billboard) | 3 |

=== Year-end charts ===
| Chart (1994) | Position |
|---|---|
| Canada Country Tracks (RPM) | 62 |
| US Country Songs (Billboard) | 40 |
