= Al Voecks =

American radio personality

Al Voecks (pronounced "vex") was the newsman for the Gerry House and the House Foundation morning show on WSIX-FM in Nashville, Tennessee.

He was born in Waverly, Iowa in 1938 and began his career in Sioux City, Iowa. Voecks came to Nashville in 1963 and worked as a television news anchor, news director and sports and weather presenter for NBC TV affiliate WSM-TV. In the 1970s, he worked for WSM Radio.

He joined the 'House Foundation' show in the early 1980s after hosting a talk show on WSIX-AM, then the sister station of the FM. Voecks does a newscast every half-hour with Duncan Stewart (House's sportscaster); he also plays along the 'Liars Club' and 'You Be The Judge' during the show each morning. House often quips on air that Voecks enjoys sitting in an empty hot tub and there are frequent references to his liquor cabinet. Occasionally on the House Foundation, House plays songs from Voecks' 'pile of music', or 'stacks of wax'.

Voecks has been named Broadcaster of the Year by the Tennessee Associated Press, and he has received recognition from numerous charitable organizations. Voecks has also co-hosted the Tennessee Crossroads on public television station WNPT since it began in 1987. In 2005, Voecks and his House-mates were named Broadcast Personality of the Year in the large market category at the Country Music Association's Broadcast Awards
