= Givin' Water to a Drowning Man =

Single by Lee Roy Parnell

from the album We All Get Lucky Sometimes
- B-side: "Squeeze Me In"
- Released: May 6, 1996
- Genre: Country
- Length: 3:30
- Label: Career
- Songwriters: Gary Nicholson; Lee Roy Parnell
- Producers: Scott Hendricks; Bill Halverson; Lee Roy Parnell

Lee Roy Parnell singles chronology
"Heart's Desire" (1996)	"Givin' Water to a Drowning Man" (1996)	"We All Get Lucky Sometimes" (1996)

"Givin' Water to a Drowning Man" is a song co-written and recorded by American country music singer Lee Roy Parnell. It was released in May 1996 as the fourth single from his album We All Get Lucky Sometimes. The song spent 20 weeks on the Hot Country Songs charts, peaking at number twelve in 1996. It was written Parnell and Gary Nicholson.

== Content ==
The song finds a man taking a stance for fidelity and offering a unique rebuff to a woman trying to lead him astray by saying, "you want to give me lovin' and I'm sure that you can but it'd be like givin' water to a drowning man..."

== Critical reception ==
Deborah Evans Price, of Billboard magazine reviewed the song favorably, saying that Parnell's "bluesy vocals percolate on this raucous Texas roadhouse number." She goes on to say that his "distinctive voice and slide guitar always make Parnell a welcome addition to country airwaves, and this tune is pure summertime fun."

== Chart performance ==
"Givin' Water to a Drowning Man" debuted at number 56 on the U.S. Billboard Hot Country Singles & Tracks for the week of May 18, 1996.

Chart (1996)	Peak position
Canada Country Singles (RPM)	10
US Hot Country Songs (Billboard)	12

=== Year-end charts ===
Chart (1996)	Position
Canada Country Tracks (RPM)	100
