= Heart's Desire (song) =

Single by Lee Roy Parnell

from the album We All Get Lucky Sometimes
- B-side: "Knock Yourself Out"
- Released: January 15, 1996
- Genre: Country
- Length: 4:13
- Label: Career
- Songwriter: Lee Roy Parnell; Cris Moore
- Producers: Scott Hendricks; Bill Halverson; Lee Roy Parnell

Lee Roy Parnell singles chronology
"When a Woman Loves a Man" (1995)	"Heart's Desire" (1996)	"Givin' Water to a Drowning Man" (1995)

"Heart's Desire" is a song co-written and recorded by American country music singer Lee Roy Parnell. It was released as the third single from his album We All Get Lucky Sometimes. The song spent 20 weeks on the Hot Country Songs charts, peaking at number three in 1996. It was his last top 10 hit on that chart. It was written Parnell and Cris Moore.

== Chart performance ==
"Heart's Desire" debuted at number 64 on the U.S. Billboard Hot Country Singles & Tracks for the week of January 20, 1996.

Chart (1996)	Peak position
Canada Country Singles (RPM)	3
US Hot Country Songs (Billboard)	3

=== Year-end charts ===
Chart (1996)	Position
Canada Country Tracks (RPM)	66
US Country Songs (Billboard)	28
