= Every Night's a Saturday Night =

Studio album by Lee Roy Parnell
- Released: June 17, 1997
- Genre: Country
- Length: 39:19
- Label: Career
- Producer: Lee Roy Parnell; The Hot Links

Lee Roy Parnell chronology
We All Get Lucky Sometimes (1995)	Every Night's a Saturday Night (1997)	Hits and Highways Ahead (1999)

Singles from Every Night's a Saturday Night
- 1. "Lucky Me, Lucky You" Released: April 19, 1997; 2. "You Can't Get There from Here" Released: August 16, 1997

Professional ratings
Review scores
Source	Rating
Allmusic	link
Entertainment Weekly	B+ link

Every Night's a Saturday Night is the fifth studio album by American country music artist Lee Roy Parnell. It was released via Career Records, a sister label of Arista Nashville, on June 17, 1997. The album includes the singles "Lucky Me, Lucky You", "You Can't Get There from Here" and "All that Matters Anymore", which respectively reached #35, #39 and #50 on Billboard Hot Country Songs. Parnell produced the album with his band, The Hot Links.

Also included on this album are "Better Word for Love", originally recorded by NRBQ on their 1994 album Message for the Mess Age, and "Honky Tonk Night Time Man", originally recorded by Merle Haggard on 1974's Merle Haggard Presents His 30th Album.

== Track listing ==
No.	Title	Writer(s)	Length
1.	"Lucky Me, Lucky You"	Gary Nicholson, Lee Roy Parnell	3:46
2.	"You Can't Get There from Here"	Tony Arata	3:47
3.	"One Foot in Front of the Other"	Cris Moore, Parnell	4:11
4.	"All That Matters Anymore"	Nicholson, Parnell	4:39
5.	"Every Night's a Saturday Night"	Nicholson, Glen Clark	2:50
6.	"Tender Touch"	Parnell, Bob McDill	3:33
7.	"Better Word for Love" (featuring Trisha Yearwood)	Nicholson, Al Anderson	3:27
8.	"Honky Tonk Night Time Man"	Merle Haggard	4:03
9.	"Baton Rouge"	Guy Clark, J.C. Crowley	2:46
10.	"Mama, Screw Your Wig On Tight""	Parnell, Stephen Mackey, Kevin McKendree, James Pennebaker, Lynn Williams	3:12

== Personnel ==
As listed in liner notes.

=== The Hot Links ===
- Steven Mackey – bass guitar, fretless bass, bull fiddle, background vocals
- Kevin McKendree – piano, Hammond B-3 organ
- Lee Roy Parnell – electric guitar, slide guitar, National guitar
- James Pennebaker – electric guitar, pedal steel guitar, mandolin, background vocals
- Lynn Williams – drums, percussion

=== Additional musicians ===
- Al Anderson – acoustic guitar
- Billy Joe Walker, Jr. – acoustic guitar, gut string guitar

=== Background vocals ===
- Guy Clark
- Jonell Mosser
- Harry Stinson
- John Wesley Ryles
- Dennis Wilson
- Trisha Yearwood

=== Strings ===
- Carl Gorodetzky
- Bob Mason
- Pam Sixfin
- Gary Vanosdale
- Kris Wilkinson

Strings conducted and arranged by Carl Marsh.

== Chart performance ==
Chart (1997)	Peak position
U.S. Billboard Top Country Albums	53
U.S. Billboard Top Heatseekers	41
