= Love Without Mercy =

Studio album by Lee Roy Parnell
- Released: April 28, 1992
- Recorded: 1991
- Studio: Indigo Ranch Studios, Malibu, California, The Castle, Franklin, TN, Digital Recorders, Midtown Studios, Omnisound Studios, Nashville, TN
- Genre: Country
- Length: 36:56
- Label: Arista
- Producer: Barry Beckett; Scott Hendricks

Lee Roy Parnell chronology
Lee Roy Parnell (1990)	Love Without Mercy (1992)	On the Road (1993)

Singles from Love Without Mercy
- 1. "The Rock" Released: February 1992; 2. "What Kind of Fool Do You Think I Am" Released: May 4, 1992; 3. "Love Without Mercy" Released: September 28, 1992; 4. "Tender Moment" Released: February 22, 1993

Professional ratings
Review scores
Source	Rating
Allmusic	4/5 stars
Entertainment Weekly	B

Love Without Mercy is the second studio album by American country music singer Lee Roy Parnell. It was released in 1992 on Arista Records. The album includes the singles "The Rock", "What Kind of Fool Do You Think I Am", "Tender Moment" and "Love Without Mercy". The latter three all reached Top Ten on the Billboard country charts. "Back in My Arms Again" was also recorded & released as a single by Kenny Chesney in 1996 off of Me and You.

== Track listing ==
No.	Title	Writer(s)	Length
1.	"What Kind of Fool Do You Think I Am"	Al Carmichael, Gary Griffin	3:36
2.	"Back in My Arms Again"	Cris Moore, Lee Roy Parnell, Rory Bourke	4:00
3.	"The Rock"	Russell Smith, Jim Varsos	3:27
4.	"Ain't No Short Way Home"	Bob DiPiero, Jim Photoglo	3:33
5.	"Love Without Mercy"	Don Pfrimmer, Mike Reid	3:03
6.	"Road Scholar" (duet with Delbert McClinton)	Bourke, Moore, Parnell	4:30
7.	"Night After Night"	Moore, Parnell	3:52
8.	"Done Deal"	Moore, Parnell	4:15
9.	"Tender Moment"	Bourke, Moore, Parnell	3:08
10.	"Roller Coaster"	Bourke, Gary Nicholson, Parnell	3:32

== Personnel ==
- Eddie Bayers - drums
- Barry Beckett - keyboards
- Richard Bennett - electric guitar
- Paul Franklin - steel guitar
- Sonny Garrish - steel guitar
- Gregory Gordon - background vocals
- Jimmy Hall - background vocals
- Chris Harris - background vocals
- John Barlow Jarvis - keyboards
- John Jorgenson - electric guitar
- Tim Loftin - bass guitar
- Delbert McClinton - duet vocals on "Road Scholar"
- Terry McMillan - percussion
- Jonell Mosser - background vocals
- Lee Roy Parnell - electric guitar, slide guitar, lead vocals
- Don Potter - acoustic guitar
- Michael Rhodes - bass guitar
- Matt Rollings - keyboards
- Russell Smith - background vocals
- Harry Stinson - background vocals
- Dennis Wilson - background vocals
- Bob Wray - bass guitar
- Curtis Young - background vocals

== Production ==
- Producers: Barry Beckett, Scott Hendricks
- Production Coordination: Ragena Warden
- Mixing: Scott Hendricks, John Hurley
- Engineering: Scott Hendricks, Chuck Johnson, Jim DeMain, Patrick Kelly
- Mastering: Hank Williams

== Chart performance ==
Chart (1992)	Peak position
U.S. Billboard Top Country Albums	66
U.S. Billboard Top Heatseekers	24
