= A Little Bit of You (Lee Roy Parnell song) =

Single by Lee Roy Parnell

from the album We All Get Lucky Sometimes
- B-side: "Givin' Water to a Drowning Man"
- Released: May 8, 1995
- Genre: Country
- Length: 2:41
- Label: Career
- Songwriters: Trey Bruce; Craig Wiseman
- Producers: Scott Hendricks; Bill Halverson; Lee Roy Parnell

Lee Roy Parnell singles chronology
"The Power of Love" (1994)	"A Little Bit of You" (1995)	"When a Woman Loves a Man" (1995)

"A Little Bit of You" is a song written by Trey Bruce and Craig Wiseman, and recorded by American country music singer Lee Roy Parnell. It was released in May 1995 as the lead single from his album We All Get Lucky Sometimes, his first release for the Career Records branch of Arista Records. The song spent 20 weeks on the Hot Country Songs charts, peaking at number two in 1995.

== Music video ==
The music video was directed by Jim Yukich and premiered in mid-1995.

== Chart performance ==
"A Little Bit of You" debuted at number 67 on the U.S. Billboard Hot Country Singles & Tracks for the week of May 20, 1995.

Chart (1995)	Peak position
Canada Country Singles (RPM)	2
US Hot Country Songs (Billboard)	2

=== Year-end charts ===
Chart (1995)	Position
Canada Country Tracks (RPM)	48
US Country Songs (Billboard)	27
