= Born to Love You (Mark Collie song) =

Single by Mark Collie

from the album Mark Collie
- B-side: "The Heart of the Matter"
- Released: January 18, 1993
- Genre: Country
- Length: 3:11
- Label: MCA
- Songwriters: Mark Collie, Don Cook, Chick Rains
- Producer: Don Cook

Mark Collie singles chronology
"Even the Man in the Moon Is Cryin'" (1992)	"Born to Love You" (1993)	"Shame Shame Shame Shame" (1993)

"Born to Love You" is a song co-written and recorded by American country music artist Mark Collie. It was released in January 1993 as the second single from the album Mark Collie. The song reached number 6 on the Billboard Hot Country Singles & Tracks chart. The song was written by Collie, Don Cook and Chick Rains.

== Music video ==
The music video was directed by John Lloyd Miller and premiered in early 1993.

== Chart performance ==
"Born to Love You" debuted at number 63 on the U.S. Billboard Hot Country Singles & Tracks for the week of January 30, 1993.

Chart (1993)	Peak position
Canada Country Singles (RPM)	5
US Hot Country Songs (Billboard)	6

=== Year-end charts ===
Chart (1993)	Position
Canada Country Tracks (RPM)	64
US Country Songs (Billboard)	66
