= Love Without Mercy (song) =

Single by Lee Roy Parnell

from the album Love Without Mercy
- B-side: "Done Deal"
- Released: September 28, 1992
- Genre: Country
- Length: 3:03
- Label: Arista
- Songwriter: Don Pfrimmer; Mike Reid
- Producers: Barry Beckett and Scott Hendricks

Lee Roy Parnell singles chronology
"What Kind of Fool Do You Think I Am" (1992)	"Love Without Mercy" (1992)	"Tender Moment" (1993)

"Love Without Mercy" is a song written by Don Pfrimmer and Mike Reid. It was originally recorded by The Oak Ridge Boys for their 1987 album Heartbeat, and later by Reid on his album Twilight Town. The Oak Ridge Boys' version was the B-side of their 1988 single "True Heart".

It was later recorded by American country music singer Lee Roy Parnell. It was released in September 1992 as the third single from, and title track to, his 1992 album Love Without Mercy. The song spent 20 weeks on the Hot Country Songs charts, peaking at number eight in early 1993.

Rita Coolidge released a version on her 1998 album Thinkin' About You.

== Music video ==
The music video was directed by John Lloyd Miller and premiered in September 1992.

== Chart performance ==
"Love Without Mercy" debuted at number 68 on the U.S. Billboard Hot Country Singles & Tracks for the week of October 3, 1992.

Chart (1992–1993)	Peak position
Canada Country Singles (RPM)	10
US Hot Country Songs (Billboard)	8
