= Lee Roy Parnell (album) =

Studio album by Lee Roy Parnell
- Released: April 10, 1990
- Recorded: 1989–1990
- Studio: Omnisound Studio Nashville, TN
- Genre: Country
- Label: Arista
- Producer: Barry Beckett

Lee Roy Parnell chronology
Lee Roy Parnell (1990)	Love Without Mercy (1992)

Singles from Love Without Mercy
- 1. "Crocodile Tears" Released: February 1990; 2. "Oughta Be A Law" Released: June 1990; 3. "Family Tree" Released: October 1990

Lee Roy Parnell is the self-titled debut album by American country music singer Lee Roy Parnell. It was released in 1990 via Arista Records. The album includes the singles "Crocodile Tears", "Oughta Be a Law" and "Family Tree". Although all three singles charted on the U.S. Billboard country charts, they all missed Top 40. "Mexican Money" was also made into a music video.

Brian Mansfield of Allmusic rated the album four stars out of five, praising Barry Beckett's production.

== Track listing ==
1. "Oughta Be a Law" (Gary Nicholson, Dan Penn) – 4:18
2. "Fifty-Fifty Love" (Nicholson, Lee Roy Parnell) – 4:26
3. "Where Is My Baby Tonight" (Troy Seals, Graham Lyle) – 3:35
4. "Crocodile Tears" (Parnell, Leroy Preston) – 4:02
5. "Family Tree" (Steve Durocher, Jeannie Smith) – 3:06
6. "Let's Pretend" (Parnell, Cris Moore) – 4:10
7. "You're Taking Too Long" (Parnell, Nicholson, Rory Michael Bourke) – 5:14
8. "Mexican Money" (Parnell, Moore) – 3:03
9. "Down Deep" (Parnell, Nicholson, Bucky Jones) – 3:59
10. "Red Hot" (Parnell, Moore) – 3:30

== Personnel ==
As listed in liner notes.

=== Musicians ===
- Barry Beckett – keyboards
- John Gardner – drums
- Jim Horn, Michael Haynes, Jack Hale, Quitman Dennis – horn section
- Bill Hullett – acoustic guitar, electric guitar
- Tim Loftin – bass guitar
- Joe McGlohon – saxophone
- Jonell Mosser – background vocals
- Lee Roy Parnell – acoustic guitar, electric guitar, slide guitar, lead vocals
- Harry Stinson – background vocals
- Bergen White – background vocals
- John Willis – acoustic guitar
- Dennis Wilson – background vocals
- Glenn Worf – bass guitar

=== Production ===
- Barry Beckett – producer
- Scott Hendricks – mixing
- Denny Purcell – mastering
