= Tender Moment =

Single by Lee Roy Parnell

from the album Love Without Mercy
- B-side: "The Rock"
- Released: February 22, 1993
- Genre: Country
- Length: 3:08
- Label: Arista
- Songwriters: Rory Bourke; Cris Moore; Lee Roy Parnell
- Producers: Barry Beckett and Scott Hendricks

Lee Roy Parnell singles chronology
"Love Without Mercy" (1992)	"Tender Moment" (1993)	"On the Road" (1993)

"Tender Moment" is a song co-written and recorded by American country music singer Lee Roy Parnell. It was released in 1992 as the fourth single from his album Love Without Mercy. The song spent 20 weeks on the Hot Country Songs charts, peaking at number two in 1993. The album's first single, "The Rock", was the b-side. The song was written by Parnell, Rory Bourke and Cris Moore.

== Music video ==
The music video was directed by Michael Merriman and premiered in early 1993.

== Chart performance ==
"Tender Moment" debuted at number 59 on the U.S. Billboard Hot Country Singles & Tracks for the week of March 6, 1993.

Chart (1993)	Peak position
Canada Country Singles (RPM)	10
US Hot Country Songs (Billboard)	2

=== Year-end charts ===
Chart (1993)	Position
US Country Songs (Billboard)	38
