= When a Woman Loves a Man (Lee Roy Parnell song) =

Single by Lee Roy Parnell

from the album We All Get Lucky Sometimes
- B-side: "If the House is Rockin'"
- Released: August 28, 1995
- Genre: Country
- Length: 3:44
- Label: Career
- Songwriters: Rafe Van Hoy; Mark Luna
- Producers: Scott Hendricks; Bill Halverson; Lee Roy Parnell

Lee Roy Parnell singles chronology
"A Little Bit of You" (1995)	"When a Woman Loves a Man" (1995)	"Heart's Desire" (1996)

"When a Woman Loves a Man" is a song written by Rafe Van Hoy and Mark Luna, and recorded by American country music singer Lee Roy Parnell with Trisha Yearwood providing harmony. It was released in August 1995 as the second single from his album We All Get Lucky Sometimes. The song spent 20 weeks on the Hot Country Songs charts, peaking at number 12 in 1996.

== Music video ==
The music video was directed by Steven Goldmann and premiered in August 1995.

== Chart performance ==
"When a Woman Loves a Man" debuted at number 67 on the U.S. Billboard Hot Country Singles & Tracks for the week of September 9, 1995.

Chart (1995)	Peak position
Canada Country Singles (RPM)	21
US Hot Country Songs (Billboard)	12
