= Let Her Go (Mark Collie song) =

Single by Mark Collie

from the album Hardin County Line
- B-side: "Where There's Smoke"
- Released: February 9, 1991
- Genre: Country
- Length: 2:51
- Label: MCA
- Songwriter: Mark Collie
- Producers: Doug Johnson, Tony Brown

Mark Collie singles chronology
"Hardin County Line" (1990)	"Let Her Go" (1991)	"Calloused Hands" (1991)

"Let Her Go" is a song written and recorded by American country music artist Mark Collie. It was released in February 1991 as the third single from the album Hardin County Line. The song reached number 18 on the Billboard Hot Country Singles & Tracks chart.

== Chart performance ==
Chart (1991)	Peak position
Canada Country Singles (RPM)	15
US Hot Country Songs (Billboard)	18
