= What Kind of Fool Do You Think I Am =

Single by Lee Roy Parnell

from the album Love Without Mercy
- B-side: "Rollercoaster"
- Released: May 4, 1992
- Genre: Country
- Length: 3:36
- Label: Arista Nashville
- Songwriters: Al Carmichael, Gary Griffin
- Producers: Barry Beckett, Scott Hendricks

Lee Roy Parnell singles chronology
"The Rock" (1992)	"What Kind of Fool Do You Think I Am" (1992)	"Love Without Mercy" (1992)

"What Kind of Fool Do You Think I Am" is a song recorded by American country music artist Lee Roy Parnell, written by Al Carmichael and Gary Griffin. It was released in May 1992 as the second single from the album, Love Without Mercy. The song was Parnell's fifth single release, and his first to reach Top 40 on the Hot Country Songs charts. It is also one of three singles in his career to reach number two on the country music charts.

== Chart positions ==
"What Kind of Fool Do You Think I Am" debuted at number 75 on the U.S. Billboard Hot Country Singles & Tracks for the week of May 16, 1992.

Chart (1992)	Peak position
Canada Country Singles (RPM)	3
US Hot Country Songs (Billboard)	2

=== Year-end charts ===
Chart (1992)	Position
Canada Country Tracks (RPM)	54
US Country Songs (Billboard)	58
