= On the Road (Lee Roy Parnell song) =

Single by Lee Roy Parnell

from the album On the Road
- B-side: "Back in My Arms Again"
- Released: August 9, 1993
- Genre: Country
- Length: 4:38
- Label: Arista Nashville
- Songwriter: Bob McDill
- Producer: Scott Hendricks

Lee Roy Parnell singles chronology
"Tender Moment" (1993)	"On the Road" (1993)	"I'm Holding My Own" (1994)

"On the Road" is a song written by Bob McDill, and recorded by American country music artist Lee Roy Parnell. It was released in August 1993 as the lead-off single and title track from his album of the same name. It peaked at number 6 in the United States, and number 12 in Canada.

== Content ==
The song consists of three vignettes featuring various characters (a neglected young wife, an underachieving teenager whose father has voiced his disappointment in him, and a retired couple whose children have forgotten them and never visit), who all flee their troubled or unfulfilling lives (in a Ford Fairlane, and "hot rod Chevy" and an Airstream trailer, respectively) and find adventure on the road.

== Personnel ==
Per liner notes.

- Dan Dugmore – pedal steel guitar
- John Barlow Jarvis – piano
- John Jorgenson – electric guitar
- Lee Roy Parnell – vocals, electric slide guitar
- Billy Joe Walker Jr. – acoustic guitar
- Russell Smith – backing vocals
- Harry Stinson – backing vocals
- Lonnie Wilson – drums
- Glenn Worf – bass guitar
- Reese Wynans – electric organ

== Music video ==
The music video was directed by Michael Oblowitz.

== Chart positions ==
"On the Road" debuted at number 67 on the U.S. Billboard Hot Country Singles & Tracks for the week of August 21, 1993.

Chart (1993)	Peak position
Canada Country Singles (RPM)	12
US Hot Country Songs (Billboard)	6
