= Trey Bruce =

American songwriter

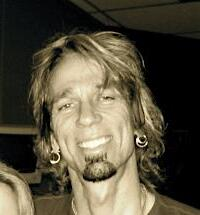
- Trey Bruce in Nashville 2007

Background information
- Born: Trey Edwin Bruce
- Origin: Memphis, Tennessee, U.S.
- Genres: Country
- Occupations: Songwriter, record producer
- Years active: 1986-present
- Website: http://www.treybruce.com/

Trey Edwin Bruce is an American songwriter. Bruce has Fourteen ASCAP Awards for the most played songs at radio and has written ten Number One singles on the Billboard. "Look Heart, No Hands", "Spirit of a Boy, Wisdom of a Man" and "Whisper My Name" by Randy Travis, and "How Your Love Makes Me Feel" by Diamond Rio, "A Little Bit of You" by Lee Roy Parnell among others. He has also co-written numerous singles for other artists, including ZZ Top, Black Stone Cherry, Faith Hill, Leann Rimes, Lynyrd Skynyrd, Deana Carter, Trisha Yearwood, Marty Stuart, Trace Adkins, Reba McEntire, Carrie Underwood, and Duff McKagan's Loaded. Bruce received a Daytime Emmy Award for Best Original Song in 2001 along with co-writers John Bettis and Brian D. Siewart.

== Biography ==
Bruce's musical career began at an early age, when he played drums at various clubs around Memphis, Tennessee. In 1989, he moved to Nashville, Tennessee, and signed with MCA Music Publishing as a songwriter. His first hit as a songwriter came in 1990, when Shelby Lynne reached the U.S. Hot Country Singles & Tracks charts with "Things Are Tough All Over"; in 1993, Randy Travis reached Number One on the same chart with Bruce's "Look Heart, No Hands". (Travis also recorded two more songs written by Bruce that also went #1 in Billboard: 1994's "Whisper My Name" and 1998's "Spirit of a Boy, Wisdom of a Man", as well as "That's Where I Draw The Line" and "Small Price To Pay".)

== Personal life ==
Trey is the son of singer/songwriter Ed Bruce and songwriter Patsy Bruce. His daughter, Sela Bruce, is a singer-songwriter. Trey has been married to Laci Bruce since 2010. They have 4 daughters, 3 of whom are from Trey's previous marriage. Laci is the sister of singer/songwriter Kree Harrison.
