= Mark Collie =

American singer-songwriter (born 1956)

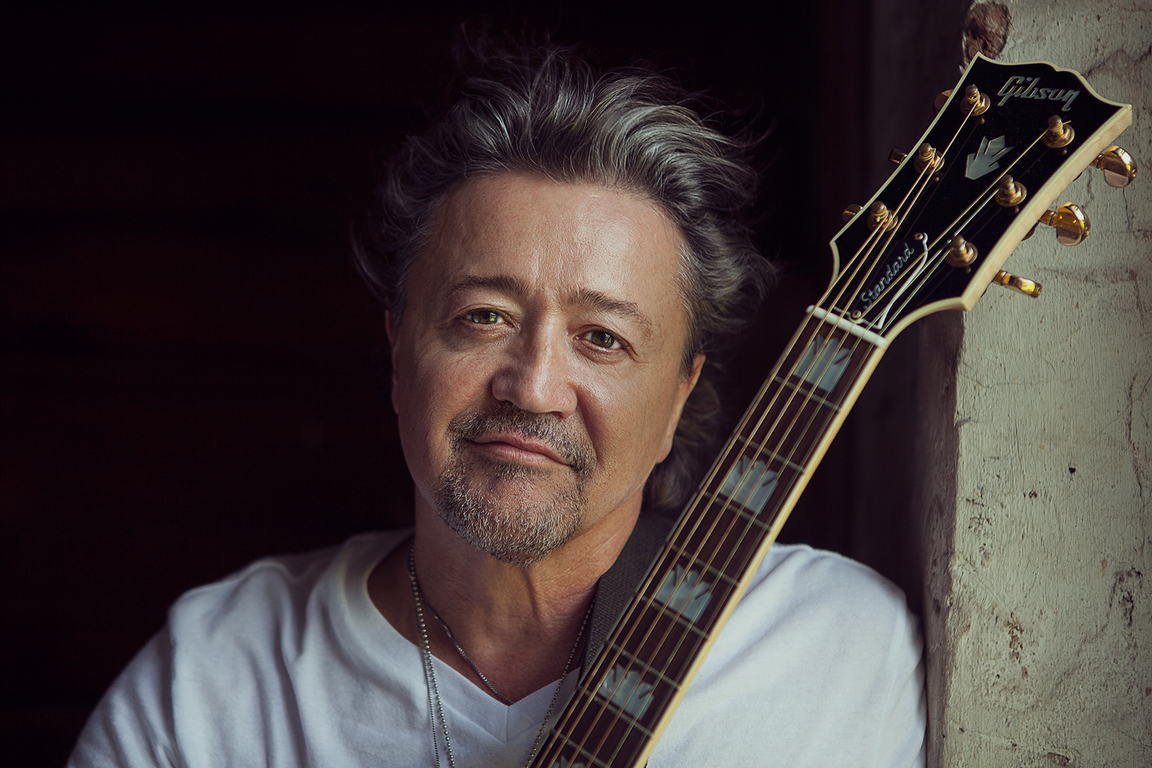
- Collie in 2013.

Background information
- Born: George Mark Collie; January 18, 1956 (age 70)
- Origin: Waynesboro, Tennessee, U.S.
- Genres: Country
- Occupations: Singer-songwriter, actor, producer
- Instruments: Vocals, guitar
- Years active: 1982–present
- Labels: MCA Nashville, Giant, Highway 64, 101 Ranch Records
- Website: http://www.markcollie.com

George Mark Collie (born January 18, 1956) is an American country music singer, songwriter, musician, actor, record producer, and fundraiser for Type 1 diabetes study. He has won awards and acclaim for his music, his acting, and his philanthropy. His singing career has included five major-label albums: four for MCA Nashville and one for Giant Records. Sixteen of his singles have charted on Hot Country Songs, including the top ten hits "Even the Man in the Moon Is Cryin'" and "Born to Love You".

Collie has also written songs for Aaron Tippin, Alabama, Garth Brooks, Tim McGraw, Warren Haynes, and JT Hodges. His acting career includes roles in Fire Down Below, The Punisher, Kill Switch and Landman.

== Singing career ==
From the beginnings of his performing and recording career, Collie's singing and performing style drew comparisons to Bruce Springsteen and Johnny Cash as a result of Collie’s combination of rockabilly energy, intensity, and clever songwriting.

=== Hardin County Line and Born and Raised in Black & White ===
Collie began his career on MCA Records in 1989 after being discovered by label representatives. Tony Brown, then-president of the label, helped Collie secure his contract. His debut album Hardin County Line was released in 1990, with Brown and Doug Johnson co-producing. The album produced four singles: "Something With a Ring to It", "Looks Aren't Everything", the title track, and "Let Her Go", which was the highest-charting of the four, at No. 18 on Hot Country Songs. Its B-side, "Where There's Smoke", was later a Top 40 single for Archer/Park in 1994.

His second album, Born and Raised in Black & White, produced Top 40 singles in "Calloused Hands" and "She's Never Comin' Back", while "It Don't Take a Lot" peaked at No. 70. Steve Huey of Allmusic described the album as "more polished" than its predecessor.

=== Mark Collie and Unleashed ===
Collie's third album for MCA, Mark Collie, was produced by Don Cook. It accounted for his two highest-charting singles: "Even the Man in the Moon Is Cryin'" at No. 5, and "Born to Love You" at No. 6. After those two songs, "Shame Shame Shame Shame" and "Something's Gonna Change Her Mind" both made top 30 as well. Brian Mansfield wrote that the album was "At once a move to the mainstream and a return to Collie's West Tennessee rockabilly roots."

Unleashed, was released in 1994. Its first single, "It Is No Secret", failed to make Top 40, while the only other release, "Hard Lovin' Woman", made No. 13. The album included guest vocals from Deborah Allen, Carlene Carter, and James House.

=== Mid 1990s-present ===
Collie signed to Giant Records in 1995. His only album for the label was Tennessee Plates, which Collie co-produced with James Stroud. Its two charting singles were "Three Words, Two Hearts, One Night", his last Top 40 entry on the country chart, and "Steady as She Goes". After these two songs, he charted at No. 72 with "Love to Burn", which he recorded for the Columbia Records multi-artist compilation NASCAR: Hotter than Asphalt. Collie covered Jim Croce's "Rapid Roy (The Stock Car Boy)" on the 1997 tribute album Jim Croce: A Nashville Tribute. In 1998, MCA released a budget-line compilation titled Even the Man in the Moon Is Cryin', which comprised several of his MCA singles.

He did not release another album until Rose Covered Garden in 2006. A live album, Alive at Brushy Mountain, was released in 2012.

He has performed onstage with many artists including Tim McGraw, Kenny Chesney, and Johnny Cash. He continues to tour actively both in the U.S. and Europe.

In September 2013 Collie signed to 101 Ranch records and was the first artist signed to them. "I'm thrilled to have a new home with 101 Ranch Records and to be working with a terrific team with Doug, Bob and Tammy," says Mark Collie. "There are some new and exciting projects coming up on the horizon that I look forward to debuting with the label."

=== Songwriting and producing ===
Collie's songwriting credits include Garth Brooks, Tim McGraw, Alabama, and George Jones. He is also noted with writing songs for Hollywood Movies such as Lions Gate's The Punisher starring Thomas Jane and Fire Down Below starring Steven Seagal.

In addition to his own recordings, Collie has produced or co-produced albums for Brandt Vogel, JT Hodges, Kyle Sherman, and the Horn Family.

== Acting ==
Collie has acted in television series and movies, independent features and Hollywood feature films. Starting in 1994 and continuing to present Collie has played a variety of characters including in 1999, Johnny Cash in the short I Still Miss Someone which he also co-wrote and co-produced with filmmaker John Lloyd Miller. Collie has appeared as Frankie Gray on the ABC series Nashville. Collie had a small role in the Marvel Comics superhero film The Punisher (2004) as an assassin named Harry Heck. In the film, he plays a song called "In Time" in front of the titular character before later attempting to kill him, only to be killed instead.

== Philanthropy ==
Collie was diagnosed with Type 1 diabetes as a teenager and in the early 1990s after finding success as a country music singer. Collie began a series of celebrity/NASCAR events that included Legend Car races and concerts that have raised millions of dollars for research into a cure for Type 1 juvenile diabetes. Collie's efforts have resulted in a research Chair at Vanderbilt University, The Mark Collie Chair in Diabetes Research, and his Mark Collie Foundation continues to generate donations.

In February 1991 Collie was part of a filmed benefit concert in Nashville's Centennial Park along with George Jones to salute American troops in Operation Desert Storm. The concert was filmed by director John Lloyd Miller and distributed for free to Armed Forces Television and to United States troops throughout the Middle East.

On April 3, 1996, Aaron Tippin and Mark Collie helped organize and load a cargo plane with 25,000 country cassettes for free distribution to United States troops in Bosnia and was later awarded The American Spirit Award by the United States Air Force for his efforts.

Collie has performed at benefits throughout his career for a diverse collection of causes including The Nashville Food Bank, The Blue Note Fund, Fallen Police, and Victims of Domestic Violence among others.

== Personal life ==
In February 2001 Mark Collie delivered the eulogy for race car legend Dale Earnhardt at a memorial service that included performances by Vince Gill and Steve Wariner at the Gaylord Entertainment Center in Nashville, Tennessee.

Collie married longtime girlfriend Tammy Stewart at a private ceremony in Columbia, Tennessee, on October 24, 2009. The two split their time between their home in Fort Worth, Texas, and Nashville, Tennessee.

== Discography ==
=== Studio albums ===
Title	Album details	Peak chart positions			
Title	Album details	US Country	US	US Heat	CAN Country
Hardin County Line	Release date: March 29, 1990; Label: MCA Nashville	57	—	—	—
Born and Raised in Black & White	Release date: July 23, 1991; Label: MCA Nashville	—	—	—	—
Mark Collie	Release date: January 5, 1993; Label: MCA Nashville	38	156	6	8
Unleashed	Release date: July 19, 1994; Label: MCA Nashville	—	—	—	—
Tennessee Plates	Release date: July 18, 1995; Label: Giant Nashville	—	—	—	—
Rose Covered Garden	Release date: November 22, 2006; Label: Highway 64	—	—	—	—
Alive at Brushy Mountain State Penitentiary	Release date: May 1, 2012; Label: Wilbanks Entertainment	—	—	—	—
Book of My Blues	Release date: June 4, 2021; Label: self-released	—	—	—	—
"—" denotes releases that did not chart

=== Compilation albums ===
Title	Album details
Even the Man in the Moon Is Cryin'	Release date: December 18, 1997; Label: Universal Special Products
Icon	Release date: April 15, 2016; Label: MCA Nashville

=== Singles ===
Year	Single	Peak chart positions		Album
Year	Single	US Country	CAN Country	Album
1982	"I've Got to Have You Back Again"	—	—	—N/a
1990	"Something with a Ring to It"	54	—	Hardin County Line
1990	"Looks Aren't Everything"	35	28	Hardin County Line
1990	"Hardin County Line"	59	64	Hardin County Line
1991	"Let Her Go"	18	15	Hardin County Line
1991	"Calloused Hands"	31	19	Born and Raised in Black & White
1991	"She's Never Comin' Back"	28	38	Born and Raised in Black & White
1992	"It Don't Take a Lot"	70	84	Born and Raised in Black & White
1992	"Even the Man in the Moon Is Cryin'"	5	11	Mark Collie
1993	"Born to Love You"	6	5	Mark Collie
1993	"Shame Shame Shame Shame"	26	45	Mark Collie
1993	"Something's Gonna Change Her Mind"	24	21	Mark Collie
1994	"It Is No Secret"	53	59	Unleashed
1994	"Hard Lovin' Woman"	13	9	Unleashed
1995	"Three Words, Two Hearts, One Night"	25	42	Tennessee Plates
1995	"Steady as She Goes"	65	—	Tennessee Plates
1996	"Love to Burn"	72	88	NASCAR: Hotter Than Asphalt
1996	"Lipstick Don't Lie"	—	—	Tennessee Plates
1997	"Rapid Roy (The Stock Car Boy)"	—	—	Jim Croce: A Nashville Tribute
2004	"In Time"	—	—	The Punisher: The Album
2006	"Better Man Than Me"	—	—	Rose Covered Garden
2015	"Raisin' Cain" (featuring Billy Bob Thornton and The Boxmasters)	—	—	—N/a
"—" denotes releases that did not chart

== Miscellaneous appearances ==
Year	Song	Album
1996	"Love to Burn"	NASCAR: Hotter Than Asphalt
1997	"Fire Down Below" (with Aaron Tippin and Jeff Wood)	Fire Down Below
1998	"Born to Love You"	Country Wedding Music
2004	"In Time"	Punisher
2005	"More"	Lost Lake
2005	"Ripples in The Mind"	Lost Lake
2010	"Dare The World" (with Major Rising, Bryan White, Wayne Warner, Linda Davis, Kevin Sharp, Jimmy Fortune, John Berry, and Mila Mason)	single music download only

== Filmography ==
=== Film ===
Year	Title	Role	Notes
1997	Fire Down Below	Hatch	
1999	Certain Guys	Redneck	
1999	The Kid with X-ray Eyes	Morgan	Direct-to-video
2000	Jericho	Johnny 'O	
2000	Johnny Cash: Half Mile a Day	Himself	Documentary video
2003	Peak Experience	E.Z. Ferris	
2004	The Punisher	Harry Heck	
2008	A Father's Rights	Det. Eddie Roberts	
2008	Kill Switch	Billy Joe Hill	Direct-to-video
2015	The Secret Handshake	Buck	
2018	Every Other Holiday	Ollie	

=== Television ===
Year	Title	Role	Notes
1998	Walker, Texas Ranger	Danny Tarpin	Episode: "Paradise Trail"
1998	Early Edition	CPD Detective	Episode: "In Gary We Trust"
1999	Dr. Quinn, Medicine Woman: The Movie	Mr. Garrick	Television film
1999	The Strip	Lt. Wolf	2 episodes
2000	JAG	Impound Lot Attendant	Episode: "A Separate Peace: Part 1"
2001	Ask Me No Questions	Sean Johnson	Television film
2015–2016	Nashville	Frankie Gray	12 episodes
2017	Still the King	Chuck	Episode: "Flatbushes"
2024	Landman	Sheriff Walt Joeberg	Main role

== Music videos ==
Year	Video	Director
2008	"Dare The World" (John Berry, Mark Collie, Linda Davis, Jimmy Fortune, Mila Mason, Kevin Sharp, Bryan White, Wayne Warner)	John Lloyd Miller
1997	"Fire Down Below" (w/ Aaron Tippin and Jeff Wood)	Steven R. Monroe
1997	"Rapid Roy (The Stock Car Boy)"	Tom Bevins
1996	"Lipstick Don't Lie"	Steven T. Miller/R. Brad Murano
1995	"Hard Lovin' Woman"	John Lloyd Miller
1995	"Three Words, Two Hearts, One Night"	John Lloyd Miller
1994	"It Is No Secret"	John Lloyd Miller
1993	"Born to Love You"	John Lloyd Miller
1993	"Shame Shame Shame Shame"	Mark "Aldo" Miceli
1992	"She's Never Comin' Back"	John Lloyd Miller
1992	"Even the Man in the Moon Is Cryin'"	John Lloyd Miller
1991	"Let Her Go"	John Lloyd Miller
1990	"Something with a Ring to It"	John Lloyd Miller
1990	"Looks Aren't Everything"	John Lloyd Miller
1990	"Hardin County Line"	John Lloyd Miller

== Awards ==
(all columns are sortable)

Year	Title	Type	Award	Notes
2006	Tennessean of the Year	Philanthropy	Tennessean of the Year, State of Tennessee	Won
1999	I Still Miss Someone	Short film	Best Short Film, New York Independent Film Festival	Won
1999	I Still Miss Someone	Short film	Best Short Film, Yahoo! Online Film Festival	Won
1999	I Still Miss Someone	Short film	Best Short Film, Atlantic City Film Festival	Won
1999	I Still Miss Someone	Short film	Nashville Film Festival (2 awards) -Best Film -Best Short Film	Won
1999	I Still Miss Someone	Short film	Method Fest, Best Actor (Mark Collie)	Won
1999	I Still Miss Someone	Short film	Zoie Fest (2 awards) -Best Picture, Dramatic Short -Audience Award, Best Short Film	Won
1999	I Still Miss Someone	Short film	Best Narrative Short, South by Southwest	Nominated
1999	I Still Miss Someone	Short film	Best Short Film, Oberhausen International Festival	Nominated
1996	US Air Force	Philanthropy	American Spirit Award	Won
1994	Born To Love You	Album	BMI Award	Won
1994	Hard Lovin Woman	Album	BMI Millionaire Award	Won
1994	Country Music Hall of Fame	Music	Country Music Walkway of Stars	Won
1993	Even the Man in the Moon Is Cryin'	Album	ASCAP Pop Music Award	Won
