= Gerry House =

American musician

Gerry House (born 1948) is an American radio personality who was heard on WSIX-FM in Nashville, Tennessee on the morning show Gerry House and the House Foundation from 1983 to 2010. House has won the CMA ACM Billboard and Marconi awards for Personality of the Year numerous times.

House is also a songwriter, who has written songs for George Strait ("The Big One"), Reba McEntire ("Little Rock"), LeAnn Rimes ("On the Side of Angels") and Pam Tillis ("The River and the Highway"). He has also had his songs recorded by Brad Paisley, Randy Travis, Trace Adkins, Mark Collie, Clint Black, Neal McCoy, The Oak Ridge Boys, and Big & Rich, among others.

In November 2023 House was inducted into the Radio Hall of Fame by Dolly Parton and Keith Urban.

== Family ==
Gerry House was born in Independence, Kentucky, a suburb of Cincinnati, Ohio, on March 28, 1948, to Lucille and Homer House.

House married Allyson Faulkner in 1970 and has a daughter, Autumn House Tallant.

== Career ==
Before moving to Nashville, House worked in Richmond, Kentucky, Louisville, Kentucky, Ithaca, New York and Jacksonville, Florida. He first joined WSIX-AM in 1975. House had also begun to do stand-up comedy and was writing songs.

In the early 1980s, WSIX-FM, a country music-formatted FM outlet, appointed House to host a new morning show. Al Voecks, who had previously been a local TV news anchor, had presented a talk show on the AM station, and he soon became House's newsman. Duncan Stewart joined the cast as House's sports reporter, and Paul Randall began as a traffic reporter and eventually became House's co-presenter. Around this time, the program began being known as The House Foundation.

The House Foundation was temporarily dissolved in 1985 when House left for a WSIX competitor, WSM-AM. After a short time at WSM as the final host of historic morning program The Waking Crew, the last morning radio program in America with a live band, House was hired by KLAC in Los Angeles. House's time on the West Coast was also relatively brief; he soon left KLAC and came back to WSIX-FM and resumed Gerry House and the House Foundation, with Voecks, Stewart and Randall, all in their original roles. Devon O'Day also joined the show as producer and for a country music news segment called "Twang Talk".

House earned a record deal with MCA Records and released two country–comedy albums, The Cheater's Telethon in 1990 and Bull in 1992. House also hosted several nationally syndicated radio shows, including Countryline USA, America's Number Ones and The Saturday Night House Party.

When Paul Randall became very ill, Mike Bohan joined the show in 1995, after 20 years at WSM radio and WSMV television. Randall succumbed to his illness in 1998; Bohan continued with the show, while Richard Falklen directing the show and hosting the news segment once named "Twang Talk".

In addition House operates a music publishing company, House Notes, which owns the songs he has written. Some of his writing partners over the years have included O'Day, Gary Burr and Don Schlitz, who have all had number-one hits with House. In addition, House records the "Maurice" (a character he bought from Los Angeles) segments for his show in the House Notes studio, as well as voices such as "Makk Truck" and "Homer".

House has contributed to Nick Barraclough's BBC Radio 2 country show, offering 'news from Nashville'. He also hosted Radio 2's coverage of the Country Music Association Awards with Barraclough in 2004.

It was announced May 19, 2017, that House would return to the airwaves on WNRQ-FM, with Bohan, on May 26, 2017.

== Retirement ==
On August 15, 2003, House was hospitalized after complaining of a severe headache. He was diagnosed with a bleeding artery and underwent surgery to repair it and underwent further surgery to relieve fluid and swelling on his brain. He made a full recovery.

On September 3, 2010, House announced the dissolution of the House Foundation and that their December 15, 2010 broadcast would be their last.

House was inducted into the NAB Radio Hall of Fame in the spring of 2011, placing his name next to Cousin Brucie, Wolfman Jack, Larry King, Bob Hope, Jack Benny and Ronald Reagan.

In March 2014, BenBella Books released House's hardcover book, Country Music Broke My Brain: A Behind-The-Microphone Peek At Nashville's Famous & Fabulous Stars. The foreword is written by his good friend Reba. At press time they are still speaking.

House now spends his time between his homes in Nashville and WaterSound, Florida.

== Discography ==
=== Notable recordings of House songs ===
- "The Big One" (George Strait)
- "Little Rock" (Reba McEntire)
- "On the Side of Angels" (LeAnn Rimes)
- "The River and the Highway" (Pam Tillis)
- "Thirteen Mile Goodbye" (Randy Travis)
- "Three Words, Two Hearts, One Night" (Mark Collie)

=== Albums ===
- 1990 The Cheater's Telethon
- 1992 Bull
