= Lee Roy Parnell =

American country musician (born 1956)

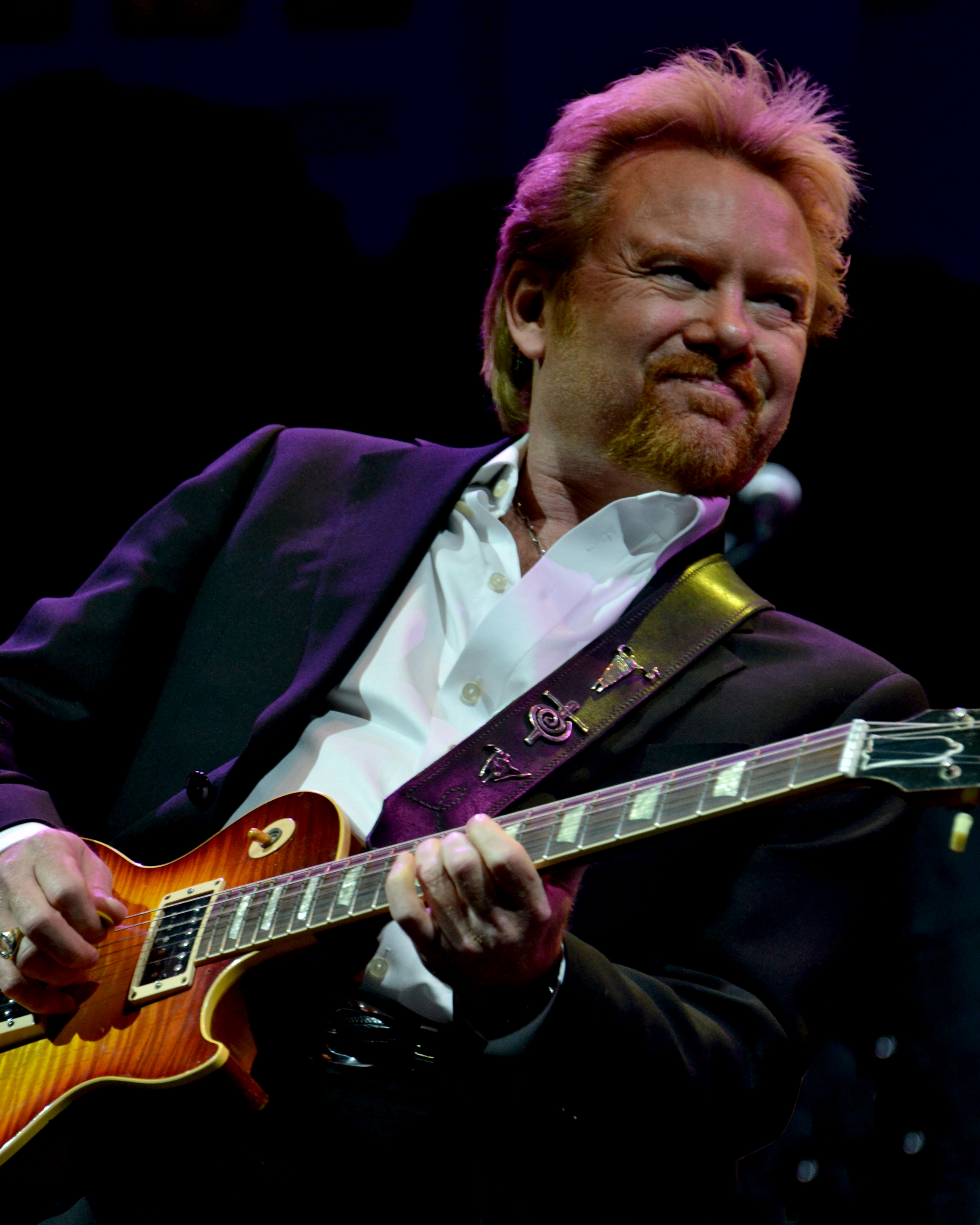
- Parnell at the Texas Songwriter's Hall of Fame 2011

Background information
- Born: December 21, 1956 (age 69); Abilene, Texas, U.S.
- Origin: Stephenville, Texas, U.S.
- Genre: Country
- Occupations: Singer, songwriter, guitarist
- Instruments: Vocals, guitar
- Years active: 1990–present
- Labels: Arista Nashville, Career, Vanguard, Universal South, Vector
- Website: leeroyparnell.com

Lee Roy Parnell (born December 21, 1956) is an American country singer, songwriter, and guitarist. Active since 1990, he has recorded eight studio albums, and has charted more than twenty singles on the Billboard Hot Country Singles & Tracks (now Hot Country Songs) charts. His highest-charting hits are "What Kind of Fool Do You Think I Am" (1992), "Tender Moment" (1993), and "A Little Bit of You" (1995), all of which peaked at number two. He recorded for the former Arista Nashville for the entirety of the 1990s, with later releases on Vanguard, Universal South (now Show Dog-Universal Music), and Vector. Parnell's music is defined by his blues influences and use of slide guitar.

== Early years ==
Parnell was born in Abilene, Texas, but raised in Stephenville, Texas. His father had performed with Bob Wills, and Parnell gave his first performance at age six on Wills' radio show. Parnell played guitar and drums in various bands during his teenage years. He joined Kinky Friedman's Texas Jewboys in his late teens and moved to Austin in 1974 to join the city's budding music scene. He moved to Nashville, Tennessee, in 1987, and he signed with the Arista Nashville recording company two years later.

== Career ==
=== Lee Roy Parnell ===
Parnell released his self-titled debut album for Arista Records in 1990. This album produced three chart singles in "Crocodile Tears", "Oughta Be a Law" and "Family Tree", none of which charted in the Top 40 on the Billboard country charts. A video for "Mexican Money" was created and released, but the song was not released to radio.

=== Love Without Mercy ===
Love Without Mercy was Parnell's breakthrough album, released in 1992. Although its lead-off single "The Rock" fell short of Top 40, the next three singles all reached Top Ten: "What Kind of Fool Do You Think I Am" at No. 2, the title track at No. 8, and finally "Tender Moment" also at No. 2. These three were also Top Ten hits on the RPM charts in Canada.

=== On the Road ===
1993's On the Road, Parnell's third album for the Arista label, also produced two top-10 hits: the title track and "I'm Holding My Own", at No. 6 and No. 3 respectively. The album also contained a No. 17-peaking rendition of the Hank Williams song "Take These Chains from My Heart", which Parnell recorded as a duet with Ronnie Dunn of Brooks & Dunn, although Dunn was not credited on the chart. The final single from On the Road, "The Power of Love", peaked at No. 51.

=== We All Get Lucky Sometimes ===
Parnell's fourth album, 1995's We All Get Lucky Sometimes, was also his first for Career Records, then a newly formed subsidiary of Arista Nashville. This album's lead-off single "A Little Bit of You" was the third single of his career to reach No. 2. Following it were the No. 12 "When a Woman Loves a Man" (featuring background vocals by Trisha Yearwood), the No. 3 "Heart's Desire" and another No. 12 in "Giving Water to a Drowning Man". The album's title track, which was its fifth single, peaked at No. 46.

=== Every Night's a Saturday Night and Hits and Highways Ahead ===
Every Night's a Saturday Night was Parnell's final release for Career Records. This was his first album since his debut release that did not produce a Top Ten hit, and only three singles were released from it: "Lucky Me, Lucky You" at No. 35, "You Can't Get There From Here" at No. 39 (his final Top 40 hit), and "All That Matters Anymore" at No. 50. After Career Records was merged back into Arista Nashville, Parnell released his final album for the Arista label, 1999's Hits and Highways Ahead. This album's only single, "She Won't Be Lonely Long", peaked at No. 57, and by the year's end, Parnell exited Arista's roster.

=== Tell the Truth, Back to the Well and Midnight Believer ===
In 2000 Parnell signed to Vanguard Records and released the album Tell the Truth. This album's only single, "South by Southwest", failed to chart, and he soon left the label as well. Parnell's next album, Back to the Well, came in 2006 on Universal South Records, although it also produced only one non-charting single in "Daddies and Daughters."

== External contributions ==
Besides playing slide guitar and National guitar on his albums and co-writing several of his own songs, Parnell has co-written two Top 40 country hits for other artists: "Too Much" by Pirates of the Mississippi and "That's My Story" by Collin Raye, from 1992 and 1993 respectively. In 1994, he and Steve Wariner collaborated with Diamond Rio on a cover of Merle Haggard's "Workin' Man's Blues", credited to Jed Zeppelin and recorded for a tribute album Mama's Hungry Eyes: A Tribute to Merle Haggard. This rendition peaked at No. 48 on the country charts. He played slide guitar on Mary Chapin Carpenter's late-1994 Number One hit "Shut Up and Kiss Me", and appeared in the song's music video. Parnell added slide guitar to Delbert McClinton's "Sending Me Angels" in 1997, and in late 2004, he was credited with playing slide guitar on David Lee Murphy's No. 46-peaking single "Inspiration", from the album Tryin' to Get There.

== Discography ==
Studio albums

- Lee Roy Parnell (1990)
- Love Without Mercy (1992)
- On the Road (1993)
- We All Get Lucky Sometimes (1995)
- Every Night's a Saturday Night (1997)
- Tell the Truth (2001)
- Back to the Well (2006)
- Midnight Believer (2017)

Compilation albums

- Hits and Highways Ahead (1999)

== Awards and nominations ==
Year	Organization	Award	Nominee/Work	Result
1994	Country Music Association Awards	Horizon Award	Lee Roy Parnell	Nominated
1995	Country Music Association Awards	Vocal Event of the Year	"Workin' Man Blues" with Diamond Rio and Steve Wariner	Nominated
1996	Grammy Awards	Best Country Instrumental Performance	"Cat Walk" with Flaco Jimenez	Nominated
1997	Country Music Association Awards	Vocal Event of the Year	"John the Revelator: Peace in the Valley" with The Fairfield Four	Nominated
1998	Grammy Awards	Best Country Instrumental Performance	"Mama, Screw Your Wig On Tight"	Nominated
