= Randy Travis albums discography =

Randy Travis discography
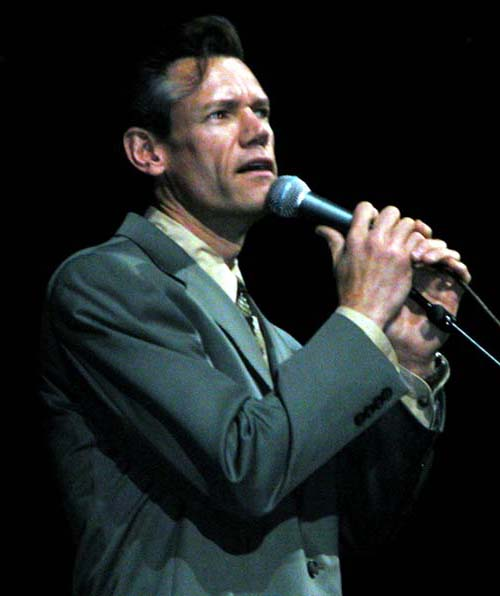
- Studio albums: 23
- Live albums: 2
- Compilation albums: 17

Randy Travis is an American country music singer. His albums discography comprises 23 studio albums, including two holiday albums, 17 compilation albums, and two live albums. His first six studio releases have all been certified platinum or higher by the Recording Industry Association of America, with the highest-certified being 1987's Always & Forever, at 5× Platinum certification for shipments of five million copies. Four more studio albums, including his first holiday album, have been certified gold, and his first two Greatest Hits packages are each certified platinum.

== Studio albums ==
=== 1980s ===
Title	Album details	Peak chart positions						Certifications (sales threshold)
Title	Album details	US Country	US	AUS	CAN Country	CAN	UK	Certifications (sales threshold)
Storms of Life	Release date: June 2, 1986; Label: Warner Bros. Records; Formats: CD, LP, cassette	1	85	—	—	61	—	AUS: Gold; US: 3× Platinum
Always & Forever	Release date: May 4, 1987; Label: Warner Bros. Records; Formats: CD, LP, cassette	1	19	97	16	8	—	CAN: 5× Platinum; US: 5× Platinum
Old 8×10	Release date: July 12, 1988; Label: Warner Bros. Records; Formats: CD, LP, cassette	1	35	—	1	14	64	CAN: 2× Platinum; US: 2× Platinum
No Holdin' Back	Release date: September 26, 1989; Label: Warner Bros. Records; Formats: CD, LP, cassette	1	33	—	—	55	—	US: 2× Platinum
"—" denotes releases that did not chart

=== 1990s ===
Title	Album details	Peak chart positions					Certifications (sales threshold)
Title	Album details	US Country	US	AUS	CAN Country	CAN	Certifications (sales threshold)
Heroes & Friends	Release date: September 11, 1990; Label: Warner Bros. Records; Formats: CD, cassette	1	31	—	—	61	CAN: Platinum; US: Platinum
High Lonesome	Release date: August 27, 1991; Label: Warner Bros. Records; Formats: CD, cassette	3	43	—	10	61	CAN: Gold; US: Platinum
Wind in the Wire	Release date: August 17, 1993; Label: Warner Bros. Records; Formats: CD, cassette	24	121	—	5	—	
This Is Me	Release date: April 26, 1994; Label: Warner Bros. Records; Formats: CD, cassette	10	59	—	5	—	US: Gold
Full Circle	Release date: August 13, 1996; Label: Warner Bros. Records; Formats: CD, cassette	9	77	—	10	—	
You and You Alone	Release date: April 21, 1998; Label: DreamWorks Nashville; Formats: CD, cassette	7	49	84	—	—	
A Man Ain't Made of Stone	Release date: September 21, 1999; Label: DreamWorks Nashville; Formats: CD, cassette	15	130	—	11	—	
"—" denotes releases that did not chart

=== 2000s ===
Title	Album details	Peak chart positions			Certifications (sales threshold)
Title	Album details	US Country	US	US Christ	Certifications (sales threshold)
Inspirational Journey	Release date: October 24, 2000; Label: Word/Warner Bros./Curb; Formats: CD, cassette	34	—	—	
Rise and Shine	Release date: October 15, 2002; Label: Word/Warner Bros./Curb; Formats: CD	8	73	1	US: Gold
Worship & Faith	Release date: November 11, 2003; Label: Word/Warner Bros./Curb; Formats: CD, music download	9	90	4	US: Gold
Passing Through	Release date: November 9, 2004; Label: Word/Warner Bros./Curb; Formats: CD, music download	23	127	6	
Glory Train: Songs of Faith, Worship, and Praise	Release date: October 25, 2005; Label: Word/Warner Bros./Curb; Formats: CD, music download	28	128	7	
Around the Bend	Release date: July 15, 2008; Label: Warner Bros. Records; Formats: CD, music download	3	14	—	
"—" denotes releases that did not chart

=== 2010s ===
Title	Album details	Peak chart positions	
Title	Album details	US Country	US
Anniversary Celebration	Release date: June 7, 2011; Label: Warner Bros. Records; Formats: CD, music download	4	19
Influence Vol. 1: The Man I Am	Release date: October 1, 2013; Label: Warner Bros. Records; Formats: CD, music download	19	120
Influence Vol. 2: The Man I Am	Release date: August 19, 2014; Label: Warner Bros. Records; Formats: CD, music download	26	—
"—" denotes releases that did not chart

=== 2020s ===
Title	Album details	Peak chart positions	Sales
Title	Album details	US Christ	Sales
Precious Memories (Worship & Faith)	Release date: February 28, 2020; Label: Gaither Music Group; Formats: CD, music download	35	US: 2,100
"—" denotes releases that did not chart

== Compilation albums ==
=== 1990s ===
Title	Album details	Peak chart positions			Certifications (sales threshold)
Title	Album details	US Country	US	CAN Country	Certifications (sales threshold)
Greatest Hits, Volume One	Release date: September 15, 1992; Label: Warner Bros. Records; Formats: CD, cassette	14	44	—	US: Platinum
Greatest Hits, Volume Two	Release date: September 15, 1992; Label: Warner Bros. Records; Formats: CD, cassette	20	67	4	US: Platinum
Forever & Ever... The Best of Randy Travis	Release date: July 12, 1995; Label: Warner Bros. Records; Formats: CD, cassette	—	—	—	
Greatest #1 Hits	Release date: August 25, 1998; Label: Warner Bros. Records; Formats: CD, cassette	66	—	—	
"—" denotes releases that did not chart

=== 2000s ===
Title	Album details	Peak chart positions		
Title	Album details	US Country	US	US Christ
Super Hits, Volume 1	Release date: February 8, 2000; Label: Warner Bros. Records; Formats: CD, cassette	—	—	—
Trail of Memories: The Randy Travis Anthology	Release date: July 16, 2002; Label: Rhino Records; Formats: CD	—	—	—
The Essential Randy Travis	Release date: March 25, 2003; Label: Warner Strategic; Formats: CD, music download	—	—	—
The Very Best of Randy Travis	Release date: August 3, 2004; Label: Warner Bros./Rhino Records; Formats: CD, music download	10	80	—
The Platinum Collection	Release date: July 25, 2006; Label: Warner Music UK; Formats: CD, music download	—	—	—
I Told You So: The Ultimate Hits of Randy Travis	Release date: March 17, 2009; Label: Warner Bros. Records; Formats: CD, music download	3	21	—
Three Wooden Crosses: The Inspirational Hits of Randy Travis	Release date: March 17, 2009; Label: Word Records; Formats: CD, music download	31	—	16
"—" denotes releases that did not chart

=== 2010s ===
Title	Album details	Peak chart positions			
Title	Album details	US Country	US	US Indie	US Christ
I'll Fly Away	Release date: August 24, 2010; Label: Warner Bros. Records; Formats: CD, music download	70	—	—	—
Top 10	Release date: September 28, 2010; Label: Warner Bros. Records; Formats: CD, music download	40	—	—	—
Randy Travis	Release date: May 2, 2011; Label: Cracker Barrel; Formats: CD	11	63	11	—
Forever Country: 15 Original Hits	Release date: 2013; Label: Cracker Barrel; Formats: CD	—	—	—	—
Hymns: 17 Timeless Songs of Faith	Release date: June 3, 2014; Label: Word/Curb; Formats: CD, music download	39	—	—	25
On the Other Hand: All the Number Ones	Release date: April 21, 2015; Label: Warner Bros. Records; Formats: CD, music download	26	191	—	—
"—" denotes releases that did not chart

== Holiday albums ==
Title	Album details	Peak chart positions					Certifications (sales threshold)
Title	Album details	US Country	US	US Christ	US Holiday	CAN	Certifications (sales threshold)
An Old Time Christmas	Release date: August 14, 1989; Label: Warner Bros. Records; Formats: CD, cassette	13	70	—	—	49	US: Gold
Songs of the Season	Release date: September 25, 2007; Label: Word Records; Formats: CD, music download	26	131	9	9	—	
"—" denotes releases that did not chart

== Live albums ==
Title	Album details	Peak positions
Title	Album details	US Country
Randy Ray: Live at the Nashville Palace	Release date: 1982; Label: Independent; Formats: LP, cassette	—
Live: It Was Just a Matter of Time	Release date: August 28, 2001; Label: Image Entertainment; Formats: CD	61
"—" denotes releases that did not chart
