= Randy Travis singles discography =

Randy Travis discography
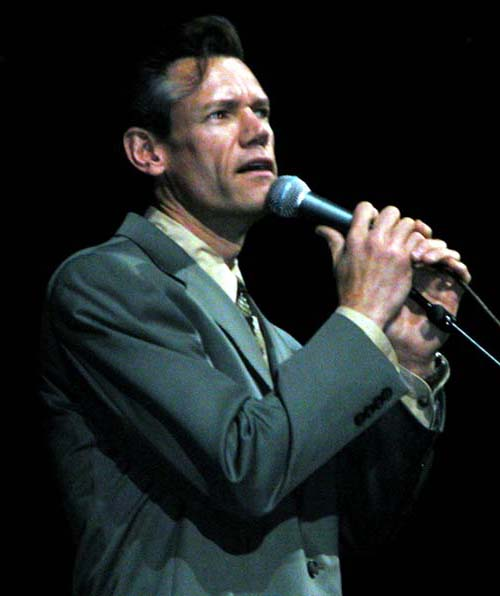
- Singles: 72
- Music videos: 36
- #1 Singles: 16

Randy Travis is an American country music singer. His singles discography comprises 72 singles and 36 music videos.

Although Travis's first two singles, (including two which were credited under his birth name of Randy Traywick), fared poorly, Travis broke through on the country charts in 1985 with the single "1982", his second release for Warner Bros. Records. After this came a re-release of "On the Other Hand", which in 1985 became his first Number One country hit. Throughout the 1980s, Travis reached Number One with all but two of his single releases. His chart success continued into the mid-1990s, interrupted only by the two single releases from the side project Wind in the Wire, which both missed Top 40.

By 1996, Travis' chart success was waning, with none of the singles from Full Circle reaching higher than number 24. After this album, he switched to DreamWorks Records, where he charted three straight Top Ten hits from the album You and You Alone. After "Spirit of a Boy, Wisdom of a Man", however, he again lost chart momentum, and switched his focus to gospel music, signing to the Christian music label Word Records. Except for the Number One hit "Three Wooden Crosses" in 2002, Travis' Word Records releases have been largely unsuccessful at country radio. In 2009, Travis once again found Top Ten success when Carrie Underwood covered his 1988 hit "I Told You So" and re-released it as a duet with him.

Out of Travis's 70 solo singles, 16 have reached Number One on the U.S. Billboard country singles charts, and thirteen more have reached Top Ten. His longest-lasting Number One is "Hard Rock Bottom of Your Heart", which spent four weeks at the top of the country charts in 1990. Four of his solo singles have also had success on the Billboard Hot 100, with the highest being "Three Wooden Crosses" at number 31, although the Carrie Underwood duet reached number 9 on the same chart.

== As lead artist ==
=== 1970s and 1980s ===
Single	Year	Peak chart positions				Certifications	Album
Single	Year	US Country	CAN Country	CAN AC	UK	Certifications	Album
"She's My Woman'" (credited as Randy Traywick)	1978	91	—	—	—		Non-album singles
"I'll Take Any Willing Woman" (credited as Randy Traywick)	1978	—	—	—	—		Non-album singles
"On the Other Hand"	1985	67	—	—	—		Storms of Life
"1982"	1985	6	5	—	—		Storms of Life
"On the Other Hand" (re-release)	1986	1	1	—	—	RIAA: Gold	Storms of Life
"Diggin' Up Bones"	1986	1	1	—	—	RIAA: Gold	Storms of Life
"No Place Like Home"	1986	2	1	24	—		Storms of Life
"White Christmas Makes Me Blue"	1986	—	—	—	—		An Old Time Christmas
"Forever and Ever, Amen"	1987	1	1	10	55	RIAA: 2× Platinum; BPI: Silver; RMNZ: Platinum	Always & Forever
"I Won't Need You Anymore (Always and Forever)"	1987	1	1	—	—		Always & Forever
"Too Gone Too Long"	1987	1	1	—	—		Always & Forever
"I Told You So"	1988	1	1	—	—	RIAA: Gold	Always & Forever
"Honky Tonk Moon"	1988	1	1	—	—		Old 8×10
"Deeper Than the Holler"	1988	1	1	—	168	RIAA: Platinum	Old 8×10
"An Old Time Christmas"	1988	—	—	—	—		An Old Time Christmas
"How Do I Wrap My Heart Up for Christmas"	1988	—	—	—	—		An Old Time Christmas
"Is It Still Over?"	1989	1	1	—	—		Old 8×10
"Promises"	1989	17	12	—	—		Old 8×10
"It's Just a Matter of Time"	1989	1	1	—	—		No Holdin' Back
"Oh, What a Silent Night"	1989	—	—	—	—		An Old Time Christmas
"—" denotes releases that did not chart

=== 1990s ===
Single	Year	Peak chart positions			Album
Single	Year	US Country	US	CAN Country	Album
"Hard Rock Bottom of Your Heart"	1990	1	—	1	No Holdin' Back
"He Walked on Water"	1990	2	—	1	No Holdin' Back
"A Few Ole Country Boys" (with George Jones)	1990	8	—	4	Heroes & Friends
"Heroes and Friends"	1991	3	—	1	Heroes & Friends
"Point of Light"	1991	3	—	1	High Lonesome
"Forever Together"	1991	1	—	1	High Lonesome
"Better Class of Losers"	1991	2	—	2	High Lonesome
"I'd Surrender All"	1992	20	—	13	High Lonesome
"If I Didn't Have You"	1992	1	—	1	Greatest Hits, Volume One
"Look Heart, No Hands"	1992	1	—	1	Greatest Hits, Volume Two
"An Old Pair of Shoes"	1993	21	—	24	Greatest Hits, Volume One
"Cowboy Boogie"	1993	46	—	10	Wind in the Wire
"Wind in the Wire"	1993	65	—	—	Wind in the Wire
"Before You Kill Us All"	1994	2	—	2	This Is Me
"Whisper My Name"	1994	1	—	1	This Is Me
"This Is Me"	1994	5	—	1	This Is Me
"The Box"	1995	7	—	2	This Is Me
"Are We in Trouble Now"	1996	24	—	18	Full Circle
"Would I"	1996	25	—	18	Full Circle
"Price to Pay"	1997	60	—	92	Full Circle
"King of the Road"	1997	51	—	74	Full Circle / Traveller soundtrack
"Out of My Bones"	1998	2	64	1	You and You Alone
"The Hole"	1998	9	— (Note: "The Hole" did not enter the Billboard Hot 100 but peaked on the Bubbling Under Hot 100 Singles chart at number five.)	4	You and You Alone
"Spirit of a Boy, Wisdom of a Man"	1998	2	42	7	You and You Alone
"Stranger in My Mirror"	1999	16	81	20	You and You Alone
"A Man Ain't Made of Stone"	1999	16	82	24	A Man Ain't Made of Stone
"—" denotes releases that did not chart

=== 2000s–2020s ===
Single	Year	Peak chart positions			Certifications	Album
Single	Year	US Country	US Country Airplay	US	Certifications	Album
"Where Can I Surrender" (Note: "Where Can I Surrender" also peaked at number 71 on the Canadian RPM Country Tracks chart.)	2000	48		—		A Man Ain't Made of Stone
"A Little Left of Center"	2000	54		—		A Man Ain't Made of Stone
"I'll Be Right Here Loving You"	2000	68		—		A Man Ain't Made of Stone
"Baptism" (Note: "Baptism" was also titled "Down with the Old Man (Up with the New)", the title under which it charted. The song also features an uncredited duet vocal from Kenny Chesney.)	2000	75		—		Inspirational Journey
"America Will Always Stand"	2001	59		—		Non-album single
"Three Wooden Crosses"	2002	1		31	RIAA: Platinum	Rise and Shine
"Pray for the Fish"	2003	48		—		Rise and Shine
"Above All"	2003	—		—		Worship & Faith
"Four Walls"	2004	46		—		Passing Through
"Angels"	2005	48		—		Passing Through
"Faith in You"	2008	—		—		Around the Bend
"Dig Two Graves"	2008	—		—		Around the Bend
"Turn It Around"	2009	—		—		I Told You So: The Ultimate Hits of Randy Travis
"Everything and All" (with Brad Paisley)	2011	—		—		Anniversary Celebration
"More Life" (with Don Henley)	2012	—		—		Anniversary Celebration
"Tonight I'm Playin' Possum" (with Joe Nichols)	2013	—	—	—		Influence Vol. 1: The Man I Am
"Gift of Love"	2014	—	—	—		Non-album single
"Don't Worry 'Bout Me"	2014	—	—	—		Influence Vol. 2: The Man I Am
"Only Daddy That'll Walk the Line"	2014	—	—	—		Influence Vol. 2: The Man I Am
"That's the Way Love Goes"	2014	—	—	—		Influence Vol. 2: The Man I Am
"One in a Row"	2019	—	—	—		Non-album singles
"Lead Me Home"	2019	—	—	—		Non-album singles
"Fool's Love Affair"	2020	—	—	—		Non-album singles
"Ain't No Use"	2021	—	—	—		Storms of Life: 35th Anniversary Edition
"Where That Came From"	2024	33	45	—		Non-album singles
"Horses in Heaven"	2025	—	—	—		Non-album singles
"—" denotes releases that did not chart

== As featured artist ==
Single	Year	Peak chart positions					Certifications (sales threshold)	Album
Single	Year	US Country	US	CAN Country	CAN	UK	Certifications (sales threshold)	Album
"Voices That Care" (among Voices That Care)	1991	—	11	—	—	—		Non-album single
"We're Strangers Again" (with Tammy Wynette)	1991	49	—	75	—	—		Best Loved Hits
"Same Old Train" (with Clint Black, Joe Diffie, Merle Haggard, Emmylou Harris, Alison Krauss, Patty Loveless, Earl Scruggs, Ricky Skaggs, Marty Stuart, Pam Tillis, Travis Tritt, and Dwight Yoakam)	1998	59	—	—	—	—		Tribute to Tradition
"I Told You So" (Carrie Underwood featuring Randy Travis)	2009	2	9	1	18	129	US: Gold	Non-album single
"—" denotes releases that did not chart

== Music videos ==
Year	Title	Director
1986	"On the Other Hand" (live)	
1986	"No Place Like Home"	
1987	"Forever and Ever Amen"	Jack Cole
1988	"I Told You So"	Ethan Russell
1989	"Is It Still Over?"	John Jopson
1989	"Promises" (live)	
1989	"It's Just a Matter of Time"	Richard Perry/Mitchell Sinoway
1989	"Santa Claus Is Coming to Town"	Jim Shea
1990	"He Walked on Water"	Mark Coppos
1990	"Heroes and Friends"	Mark Coppos
1991	"Point of Light" (live)	
1991	"Voices That Care"	David S. Jackson
1991	"Better Class of Losers"	Jim Shea
1992	"If I Didn't Have You"	Jim Shea
1992	"Look Heart, No Hands"	Jim Shea
1993	"An Old Pair of Shoes"	Jim Shea
1993	"Cowboy Boogie"	Jim Shea
1993	"Wind in the Wire"	Jim Shea
1994	"Before You Kill Us All"	Peter Israelson
1994	"Whisper My Name"	Dick Buckley
1994	"This Is Me"	Gerry Wenner
1995	"The Box"	Jim Shea
1996	"Are We in Trouble Now"	Jim Shea
1996	"Would I"	Mark Kalbfeld
1998	"Out of My Bones"	Joe Murray
1998	"The Hole"	Joe Murray
1998	"Spirit of a Boy, Wisdom of a Man"	Joe Murray
1999	"A Man Ain't Made of Stone"	David Cass
2003	"Three Wooden Crosses" (live)	
2005	"Angels"	Peter Zavadil
2006	"Raise Him Up"	
2008	"Faith in You"	Tue Walin Storm
2008	"Dig Two Graves"	Deaton Flanigen
2011	"Everything and All"	Peter Zavadil
2013	"Tonight I'm Playin' Possum"	Gary Halvorson
2013	"Unbelievabull"	CBRbullTV
2021	"There's A New Kid In Town"	The Edde Brothers
2024	"Where That Came From"	
