= List of awards and nominations received by Randy Travis =

Randy Travis awards and nominations
Awards and nominations
Award	Wins	Nominations
Grammy	6	9
Academy of Country Music	9	14
American Music Awards	10	11
Country Music Association	5	19
Dove Awards	8	4

Totals (Note: Certain award groups do not simply award one winner. They acknowledge several different recipients, have runners-up, and have third place. Since this is a specific recognition and is different from losing an award, runner-up mentions are considered wins in this award tally. For simplification and to avoid errors, each award in this list has been presumed to have had a prior nomination.)
- Wins: 38
- Nominations: 85

Singer and songwriter Randy Travis has been honored with many awards and nominations throughout his career in music.

== Academy of Country Music Awards ==
Year	Category	Nominated work	Result
1985	Top New Male Vocalist	—	Won
1986	Album of the Year	Storms of Life	Won
1986	Single of the Year	"On the Other Hand"	Won
1986	Top Male Vocalist	—	Won
1987	Single of the Year	"Forever and Ever, Amen"	Won
1987	Song of the Year	"Forever and Ever, Amen" (shared with Paul Overstreet, Don Schlitz, songwriters)	Won
1987	Top Male Vocalist	—	Won
1987	Entertainer of the Year	—	Nominated
1987	Album of the Year	Always & Forever	Nominated
1987	Video of the Year	"Forever and Ever, Amen"	Nominated
1988	Entertainer of the Year	—	Nominated
1988	Single of the Year	"I Told You So"	Nominated
1988	Top Male Vocalist	—	Nominated
1989	Entertainer of the Year	—	Nominated
1989	Album of the Year	Old 8x10	Nominated
1989	Top Male Vocalist	—	Nominated
1991	Entertainer of the Year	—	Nominated
1998	Vocal Event of the Year	Same Old Train (with Clint Black, Joe Diffie, Merle Haggard, Emmylou Harris)	Nominated
2003	Song of the Year	"Three Wooden Crosses" (shared with Douglas Johnson and Kim Williams)	Won
2003	Single of the Year	"Three Wooden Crosses"	Nominated
2008	Cliffie Stone Pioneer Award	—	Won
2009	Vocal Event of the Year	"I Told You So" (with Carrie Underwood)	Nominated
2016	Video of the Year	"Forever Country"	Won

== American Music Awards ==
Year	Category	Nominated work	Result	Ref.
1987	Favorite Country Single	"Diggin' Up Bones"	Nominated	
1988	Favorite Country Male Artist	—	Won	
1988	Favorite Country Album	Always & Forever	Won	
1988	Favorite Country Single	"Forever and Ever, Amen"	Won	
1988	Favorite Country Video	"Forever and Ever, Amen"	Won	
1989	Favorite Country Male Artist	—	Won	
1989	Favorite Country Single	"I Told You So"	Won	
1989	Favorite Country Album	Always & Forever	Won	
1990	Favorite Country Male Artist	—	Won	
1990	Favorite Country Single	"Deeper Than the Holler"	Won	
1990	Favorite Country Album	Old 8x10	Won	

== Country Music Association Awards ==
Year	Category	Nominated work	Result
1986	Horizon Award	—	Won
1986	Album of the Year	STORMS OF LIFE - Warner Bros.	Nominated
1986	Male Vocalist of the Year	—	Nominated
1986	Single of the Year	On the Other Hand - Warner Bros.	Nominated
1987	Album of the Year	Always & Forever	Won
1987	Male Vocalist of the Year	—	Won
1987	Entertainer of the Year	—	Nominated
1987	Single of the Year	"Forever and Ever, Amen"	Won
1987	Music Video of the Year	"Forever and Ever, Amen" Dir. by Jack Cole	Nominated
1988	Entertainer of the Year	—	Nominated
1988	Male Vocalist of the Year	—	Won
1988	Single of the Year	"I Told You So" - Warner Bros.	Nominated
1988	Song of the Year	"I Told You So" - Randy Travis	Nominated
1989	Entertainer of the Year	—	Nominated
1989	Male Vocalist of the Year	—	Nominated
1989	Album of the Year	OLD 8x10 - Warner Bros.	Nominated
1990	Entertainer of the Year	—	Nominated
1990	Music Video of the Year	"He Walked On Water" (with George Jones)	Nominated
1991	Vocal Event of the Year	Randy Travis and George Jones	Nominated
1992	Vocal Event of the Year	Tammy Wynette and Randy Travis	Nominated
1999	Vocal Event of the Year	"Same Old Train" (w/ Clint Black)	Nominated
2003	Single of the Year	"Three Wooden Crosses"	Nominated
2009	Musical Event of the Year	"I Told You So" (with Carrie Underwood)	Nominated
2009	Song of the Year	"I Told You So"	Nominated

== GMA Dove Awards ==
Year	Category	Nominated work	Result	Ref.
2001	Country Song of the Year	"Baptism" (shared with Mickey Cates, songwriter)	Won	
2001	Bluegrass Album of the Year	Inspirational Journey	Won	
2003	Country Album of the Year	Rise And Shine	Won	
2004	Artist of the Year	—	Nominated	
2004	Song of the Year	"Three Wooden Crosses"	Nominated	
2004	Country Song of the Year	"Pray for the Fish"	Nominated	
2004	Country Song of the Year	"Three Wooden Crosses"	Won	
2004	Country Album of the Year	Worship & Faith	Won	
2005	Country Album of the Year	Passing Through (Randy Travis album)	Won	
2006	Country Song of the Year	"Angels"	Nominated	
2006	Country Album of the Year	Glory Train: Songs of Faith, Worship, and Praise	Won	
2009	Country Album of the Year	Around the Bend	Won	

== Grammy Awards ==
Year	Category	Nominated work	Result	Ref
1987	Best Male Country Vocal Performance	"Diggin' Up Bones"	Nominated	
1988	Best Male Country Vocal Performance	Always & Forever	Won	
1989	Best Male Country Vocal Performance	Old 8x10	Won	
1990	Best Male Country Vocal Performance	"It's Just a Matter of Time"	Nominated	
1991	Best Male Country Vocal Performance	"Hard Rock Bottom of Your Heart"	Nominated	
1991	Best Country Vocal Collaboration	"Waiting on the Light to Change" (with B.B. King)	Nominated	
1991	Best Country Vocal Collaboration	"A Few Ole Country Boys" (with George Jones)	Nominated	
1993	Best Male Country Vocal Performance	"Better Class Of Losers"	Nominated	
2002	Best Southern, Country or Bluegrass Gospel Album	Inspirational Journey	Nominated	
2003	Best Southern, Country or Bluegrass Gospel Album	Rise and Shine	Won	
2004	Best Male Country Vocal Performance	"Three Wooden Crosses"	Nominated	
2005	Best Southern, Country or Bluegrass Gospel Album	Worship & Faith	Won	
2007	Best Southern, Country or Bluegrass Gospel Album	Glory Train	Won	
2009	Best Country Album	Around the Bend	Nominated	
2009	Best Country Collaboration with Vocals	"I Told You So" (with Carrie Underwood)	Won	
