= Randy Travis filmography =

American singer Randy Travis has starred in a number of films and television series ranging from 1984 to 2013.

One of Travis's first roles was the Emilio Estevez movie Young Guns, although most of his part was cut from the final edit. Travis took a minor role in an episode of Matlock in 1992, a move which he later said inspired him to continue acting. While most of his early roles were in the Western genre, Travis began to move beyond this genre with A Holiday to Remember in 1995. He also played a country music singer in the 1998 movie Black Dog.

== Television ==
Year	Title	Role	Notes
1991	Sesame Street	Self	Episode: "2782, Celebrity Guest"
1992–93	Matlock	Billy Wheeler	Episodes: "The Big Payoff", "The Mark"
1993	Wind in the Wire		Television Movie
1994	Dead Man's Revenge	U. S. Marshal	Movie
1994	Texas	Capt. Sam Garner	Miniseries
1995	A Holiday to Remember	Clay Traynor	Movie
1994–97, 2003	Touched by an Angel	Sheriff Wayne Machulis	5 episodes
1996	Frasier	Steve (voice)	Episode: "A Word to the Wiseguy"
1997	Steel Chariots	Rev. Wally Jones	TV Movie
1996	Sabrina the Teenage Witch	Himself	Episode: "The True Adventures of Rudy Kazootie"
1998	Hey Arnold!	Mr. Hyunh (singing voice) / Travis Randall (voice)	Episode: "Dangerous Lumber/Mr. Hyunh Goes Country"
1999	Boys Will Be Boys	Lloyd Clauswell	Movie
2000	King of the Hill	Himself (voice)	Episode: "Peggy's Fan Fair"
2000	The Trial of Old Drum	Charlie Burden Jr.	Movie
2001	Touched by an Angel	Jed Winslow	Episode: "Shallow Water" (Parts 1 & 2)
2003	Blue's Clues	Shoehorn	Episode: "Morning Music"
2004	Extreme Makeover Home Edition	Himself	Episode: "The Elcano Family"
2004	Airline	Himself	Episode: "Terminal Beauty"
2013	Christmas on the Bayou	Mr. Greenhall	Movie

== Film ==
Year	Title	Character	Notes
1994	Outlaws: The Legend of O.B. Taggart	Speedy	
1994	At Risk	Ellison	
1994	Frank & Jesse	Cole Younger	
1996	Edie & Pen	Pony Cobb	
1997	Fire Down Below	Ken Adams	
1997	T.N.T.	Jim	
1997	Annabelle's Wish	Adult Billy / Narrator (voice)	Direct-to-video film
1997	The Shooter	Kyle Tapert	
1997	The Rainmaker	Billy Porter	
1998	Black Dog	Earl	
1999	Baby Geniuses	Control Room Technician	
1999	The White River Kid	Sheriff Becker	
2000	The Million Dollar Kid	Businessman	
2000	I'll Wave Back	John Claiborne	
2000	The Cactus Kid	Pecos Jim	
2000	The Trial of Old Drum	Narrator	
2001	Texas Rangers	Frank Bones	
2003	The Long Ride Home	Jack Fowler / Jack Cole	
2003	Apple Jack	Narrator	Short film
2006	The Visitation	Kyle Sherman	
2006	On the Farm: The Prodigal Pig	Porkchop	Voice role
2006	Lost: A Sheep Story	Porkchop	Voice role
2007	The Wager	Michael Steele	
2007	National Treasure: Book of Secrets	Celebrity Music Star	
2010	Jerusalem Countdown	Jack Thompson	
2015	The Price	Roy Taggert	

== Works cited ==
- Cusic, Don (1990). Randy Travis: The King of the New Country Traditionalists. St. Martin's Press. ISBN 0-312-04412-7.
- Travis, Randy; Abraham, Ken (2019). Forever and Ever, Amen: A Memoir of Music, Faith, and Braving the Storms of Life. Nelson Books. ISBN 978-1-4002-1483-9.
