= Chartoff =

Chartoff is a surname. Notable people with the surname include:

- Melanie Chartoff (born 1948), American actress and comedian
- Robert Chartoff (1933–2015), American film producer and philanthropist
