= The Very Best of Randy Travis =

Compilation album by Randy Travis
- Released: August 3, 2004
- Genre: Country
- Length: 1:04:22
- Label: Warner Bros. Nashville

Randy Travis chronology
Worship & Faith (2003)	The Very Best of Randy Travis (2004)	Passing Through (2004)

Professional ratings
Review scores
Source	Rating
About.com	4/5 stars
Allmusic	4.5/5 stars

The Very Best of Randy Travis is a compilation album by American country music artist Randy Travis. It was released in 2004 via Warner Bros. Records. It includes nineteen of Travis' singles from his previous albums as well as one album track "I'm Gonna Have a Little Talk" from his 1991 album High Lonesome. The album peaked at number 10 on the Billboard Top Country Albums chart.

== Track listing ==
No.	Title	Writer(s)	Length
1.	"Diggin' Up Bones"	Al Gore, Paul Overstreet, Nat Stuckey	3:01
2.	"On the Other Hand"	Overstreet, Don Schlitz	3:07
3.	"Forever and Ever, Amen"	Overstreet, Schlitz	3:33
4.	"Too Gone Too Long"	Gene Pistilli	2:26
5.	"I Told You So" (single remix)	Randy Travis	3:40
6.	"I Won't Need You Anymore (Always and Forever)"	Max D. Barnes, Troy Seals	3:10
7.	"Honky Tonk Moon"	Dennis O'Rourke	2:49
8.	"Deeper Than the Holler"	Overstreet, Schlitz	3:38
9.	"Is It Still Over?"	Ken Bell, Larry Henley	3:11
10.	"It's Just a Matter of Time" (country single mix)	Brook Benton, Belford Hendricks, Clyde Otis	3:56
11.	"Hard Rock Bottom of Your Heart" (single remix)	Hugh Prestwood	3:57
12.	"He Walked on Water"	Allen Shamblin	3:25
13.	"Heroes and Friends" (long single edit)	Schlitz, Travis	3:15
14.	"Forever Together"	Travis, Alan Jackson	3:06
15.	"Better Class of Losers"	Travis, Jackson	2:40
16.	"I'm Gonna Have a Little Talk"	Schlitz, Travis	2:41
17.	"If I Didn't Have You"	Skip Ewing, Barnes	3:06
18.	"Look Heart, No Hands"	Trey Bruce, Russell Smith	3:11
19.	"Whisper My Name"	Bruce	3:09
20.	"Three Wooden Crosses"	Kim Williams, Doug Johnson	3:21

== Charts ==
=== Weekly charts ===
Chart (2004)	Peak position
US Billboard 200	80
US Top Country Albums (Billboard)	10

=== Year-end charts ===
Chart (2005)	Position
US Top Country Albums (Billboard)	63
