= Where That Came From =

Single by Randy Travis
- Released: May 3, 2024
- Genre: Country
- Length: 3:11
- Label: Warner Music Nashville
- Songwriters: Scotty Emerick; John Scott Sherrill
- Producers: Jerry Douglas; Kyle Lehning

Randy Travis singles chronology
"Ain't No Use" (2021)	"Where That Came From" (2024)	"Horses in Heaven" (2025)

Music video
- "Where That Came From" on YouTube

"Where That Came From" is a song written by Scotty Emerick and John Scott Sherrill and recorded by American country music singer Randy Travis. It was released on May 3, 2024, and served as Travis' first new recording of music in over a decade, developed through the use of artificial intelligence software to recreate his vocals following a series of strokes and health issues that left him unable to sing, overlaid over a vocal bed of an existing 2011 recording of the song from Travis's collaborator James Dupré.

== Background ==
In July 2013, Travis experienced difficulty breathing while working out at his home gym. He was hospitalized in Dallas, Texas for viral cardiomyopathy. While undergoing treatment, Travis suffered congestive heart failure and a stroke. The stroke affected the left side of Travis's brain, impacting movement on the right side of his body. Travis was placed on life support after the infection caused his lungs to collapse, and was declared to have a one percent chance of survival. The infection, subsequent stroke, and three separate bouts of pneumonia led to Travis undergoing three tracheostomies and two brain surgeries. Travis also suffered aphasia and lost the ability to speak and sing, while also suffering vision problems. These issues were mitigated through years of therapy with Mary Davis, to whom he was engaged at the time. By November 2014, he was recovering, could walk short distances without assistance, and was re-learning to write and play guitar, according to Davis. While the stroke removed most of Travis's ability to sing, he has made sporadic onstage appearances to perform in limited capacity.

In 2023, the increased use of artificial intelligence spurred conversation about the need to protect artists' rights. However, Cris Lacy, Warner Music Nashville co-chair and co-president, believed that some positive influence could come from it in the way of "giving Randy Travis his voice back". "Where That Came From" is a ballad written by Scotty Emerick and John Scott Sherrill, and Travis' longtime producer Kyle Lehning developed the vocal track from an initial recording done by vocalist and frequent touring partner James Dupré, working for months on perfecting it from the AI model's base rendering. They worked from two proprietary AI models that utilized vocal stems from Travis' career spanning from 1985 to 2013. Dupré had originally recorded the vocal track in 2011 and had never granted permission to use the recording, only being informed that Warner Music Group had appropriated his recording on the day of an interview with CBS News Sunday Morning; Dupré granted his permission after the fact and was financially compensated for the use of his record.

== Reception ==
Surrounded by friends and family, Travis reacted with a "Cheshire grin" when the finished product was played in the studio for the first time, and Travis' wife, Mary, was moved to tears, saying "you forget how much you missed it until you hear it again". Fellow country music artists and friends of Travis such as Carrie Underwood, Cole Swindell, and Clay Walker were among those invited to the studio to preview the song ahead of its release and reacted to it with "a mix of joy and wonder".

Taste of Country placed it at number 20 on its list of the Top 40 Country Songs of 2024.

== Music video ==
The music video for "Where That Came From" premiered on May 6, 2024. It is composed of footage from the recording studio, documenting scenes from the process of the song's creation and of the reactions by Travis as well as his family and friends listening to the track for the first time.

== Chart performance ==
"Where That Came From" debuted at number 45 on the Billboard Country Airplay chart dated May 18, 2024, becoming Travis' first solo single to chart since "Angels" reached a peak of number 48 in 2005.

== Charts ==
Chart performance for "Where That Came From"
Chart (2024)	Peak position
US Country Airplay (Billboard)	45
US Hot Country Songs (Billboard)	33
