= Anniversary Celebration =

Studio album by Randy Travis
- Released: June 7, 2011
- Recorded: 2010
- Studio: Avatar, New York City; Brighter Shade, Marietta; Ocean Way, Nashville; Sound Emporium, Nashville; Starstruck, Nashville; The Compound, Nashville; Cork Room, Fayetteville
- Genre: Country
- Length: 61:29
- Label: Warner Bros. Nashville
- Producer: Kyle Lehning

Randy Travis chronology
| Three Wooden Crosses: The Inspirational Hits of Randy Travis (2010) | Anniversary Celebration (2011) | Influence Vol. 1: The Man I Am (2013) |

Singles from Anniversary Celebration
- 1. "Everything and All" Released: August 15, 2011; 2. "More Life" Released: May 14, 2012

Anniversary Celebration is the twentieth studio album by American country music singer Randy Travis. It was released on June 7, 2011, by Warner Bros. Records to celebrate 25 years since the release of Travis' 1986 debut album, Storms of Life, and features a mix of re-recordings of older songs as well as new compositions, performed as duets with contemporary country artists.

== Track listing ==
| No. | Title | Writer(s) | Length |
|---|---|---|---|
| 1. | "Everything and All" (featuring Brad Paisley) | Troy Jones | 3:18 |
| 2. | "A Few Ole Country Boys" (featuring Jamey Johnson) | Troy Seals; Mentor Williams | 3:43 |
| 3. | "Forever and Ever, Amen" (featuring Zac Brown Band) | Paul Overstreet; Don Schlitz | 3:42 |
| 4. | "He Walked on Water" (featuring Kenny Chesney) | Allen Shamblin | 3:29 |
| 5. | "T.I.M.E." (featuring Josh Turner) | Tim Menzies; Roger Springer | 3:24 |
| 6. | "Love Looks Good on You" (featuring Kristin Chenoweth) | Hillary Lindsey; Gordie Sampson | 4:02 |
| 7. | "Better Class of Losers" / "She's Got the Rhythm (And I Got the Blues)" (Medley) (featuring Alan Jackson) | Randy Travis; Alan Jackson | 3:09 |
| 8. | "More Life" (featuring Don Henley) | Rory Bourke; Mike Reid | 4:31 |
| 9. | "Can't Hurt a Man" (featuring Tim McGraw) | Lance Miller; Brad Warren; Brett Warren | 2:46 |
| 10. | "Promises" (featuring Shelby Lynne) | John Lindley; Travis | 3:45 |
| 11. | "Is It Still Over?" (featuring Carrie Underwood) | Kenneth E. Bell; Larry Henley | 3:26 |
| 12. | "Road to Surrender" (featuring Kris Kristofferson and Willie Nelson) | Gary Duffey; Buffy Lawson; Angela Russell | 4:05 |
| 13. | "Diggin' Up Bones" (featuring John Anderson) | Al Gore; Overstreet; Nat Stuckey | 3:34 |
| 14. | "Someone You Never Knew" (featuring Eamonn McCrystal) | Kyle Jacobs; Fred Wilhelm | 3:15 |
| 15. | "Too Much" (featuring James Otto) | Donny Lowery; Gary Nichols | 3:55 |
| 16. | "Didn't We Shine" (featuring George Jones, Lorrie Morgan, Ray Price, Connie Smith, Joe Stampley and Gene Watson) | Schlitz; Jesse Winchester | 4:08 |
| 17. | "Everything and All" | Jones | 3:17 |
| Total length: | | | 61:29 |

== Charts ==
| Chart (2011) | Peak position |
|---|---|
| US Billboard 200 | 19 |
| US Top Country Albums (Billboard) | 4 |
