= Wind in the Wire (film) =

- Genre: Comedy; Drama; Western
- Written by: Jim Shea
- Directed by: Jim Shea
- Starring: Burt Reynolds; Lou Diamond Phillips; Melanie Chartoff
- Country of origin: United States
- Original language: English

Production
- Executive producer: Elizabeth Travis
- Producer: Mark Kalbfel
- Cinematography: Gerry Wenner
- Editor: Graham Dent

Original release
- Release: August 25, 1993

Wind in the Wire is a 1993 American made-for-television film directed by Jim Shea. It tells the story of children learning to be cowboys and was made to launch Randy Travis's album of the same name.

== Cast ==
- Randy Travis
- Burt Reynolds
- Lou Diamond Phillips
- Chuck Norris
- Melanie Chartoff
- Dale Robertson
- Denver Pyle
- Nick Banko as The Kid
- Charles Nelson Reilly
- Endre Hules
- Peter Jason
- Bud Stout
