= A Holiday to Remember =

1995 television film

- Genre: Drama; Romance
- Based on: A Christmas Love by Kathleen Creighton
- Written by: Darrah Cloud
- Directed by: Jud Taylor
- Starring: Connie Sellecca; Randy Travis; Rue McClanahan; Asia Vieira
- Music by: Claude Desjardins; Eric Robertson
- Country of origin: United States
- Original language: English

Production
- Executive producer: Howard Braunstein
- Producers: Marilyn Stonehouse; Jud Taylor
- Production locations: British Columbia; Toronto
- Cinematography: Jan Kiesser
- Editor: Ron Wisman
- Running time: 90 minutes
- Production companies: Jaffe/Braunstein Films; Pebblehut Productions

Original release
- Network: CBS
- Release: December 12, 1995

A Holiday to Remember is a 1995 American made-for-television Christmas romantic-drama film starring Connie Sellecca and Randy Travis. It premiered on CBS on December 12, 1995. As of 2009, it was shown in the 25 Days of Christmas programming block on ABC Family, but it was not part of the block in 2010 and re-emerged on the competing AMC Best Christmas Ever block in 2019. The film's score was composed by Eric Robertson.

== Plot ==
At Christmastime, Carolyn (Connie Sellecca) leaves the big city for her childhood village in the forest, with her daughter Jordy (Asia Vieira) in tow. Along the way, Carolyn meets the ex-fiancé (Randy Travis) she left at the altar years before, as well as a lost boy she would like to adopt, though Jordy is unenthusiastic.

== Cast ==
- Connie Sellecca as Carolyn Giblin
- Randy Travis as Clay Traynor
- Rue McClanahan as Miz Leona
- Asia Vieira as Jordy Giblin

== See also ==
- List of Christmas films
