= Melanie Chartoff =

American actress (born 1948)

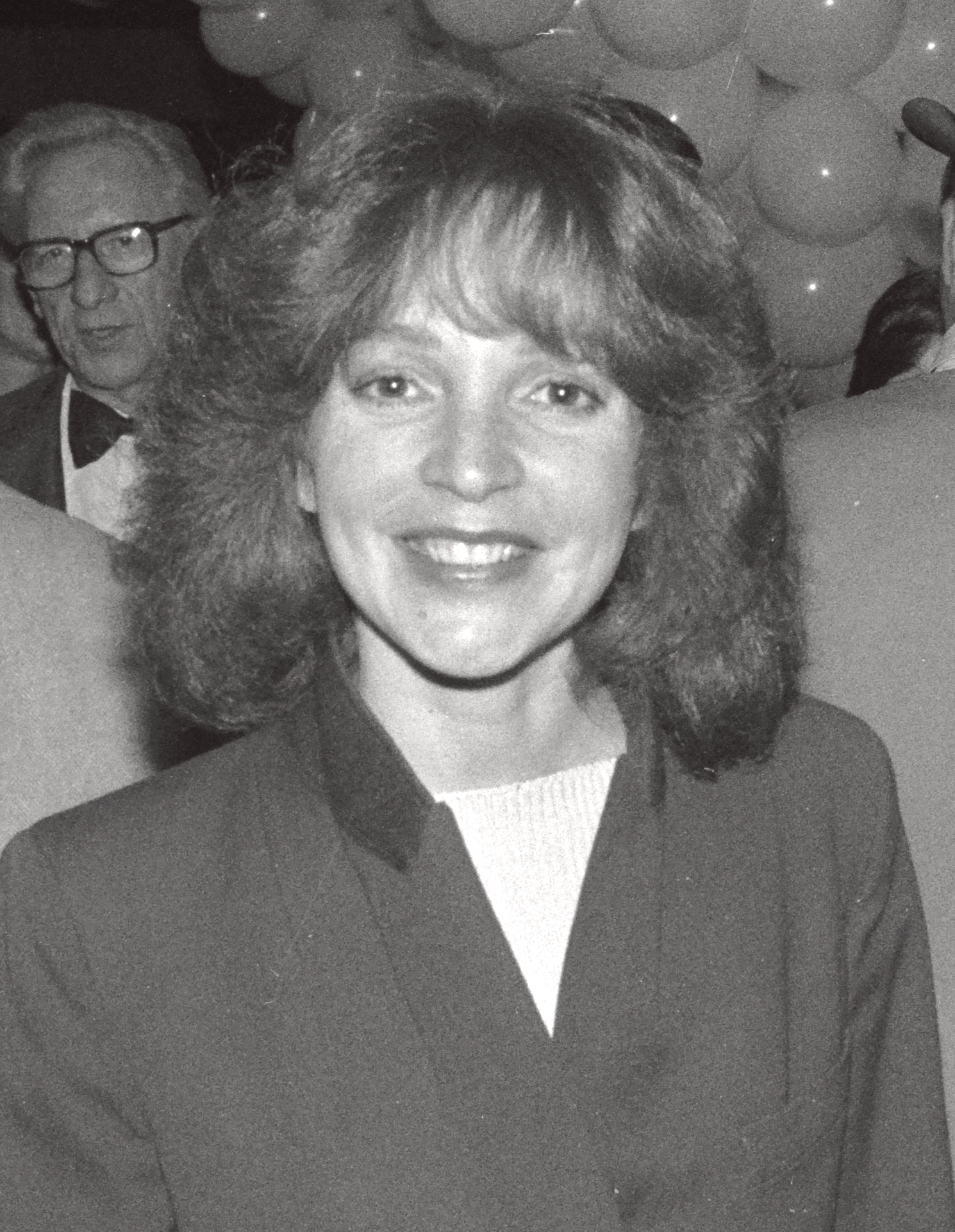
- Chartoff in 1980
- Born: Melanie Barbara Chartoff; December 15, 1948 (age 77); New Haven, Connecticut, U.S.
- Education: Adelphi University
- Occupations: Actress; comedian
- Years active: 1976–present
- Spouse: Stan Friedman (m. 2013)

Melanie Barbara Chartoff (born December 15, 1948) is an American actress and comedian. Chartoff first became famous for her comedy work on the ABC series Fridays (1980–1982), and in the 1990s Fox sitcom Parker Lewis Can't Lose. She voiced both Didi Pickles and Grandma Minka, Didi's mother on the Nickelodeon animated series Rugrats and All Grown Up!.

== Early life ==
Chartoff was born on December 15, 1948, in New Haven, Connecticut, and attended West Haven High School. She went on to earn a Bachelor of Arts from Adelphi University. Chartoff is Jewish.

== Career ==
Her first Broadway appearances were in Galt MacDermot's space opera Via Galactica (1972), directed by Peter Hall, and The Young Vic's Scapino, starring Jim Dale (1974).

Chartoff's first TV role came in 1976 when she played a nurse on Search for Tomorrow, after which she appeared in the 1978 motion picture American Hot Wax. She first became a nationally known figure on ABC's Fridays, which was ABC's attempt to create its own version of Saturday Night Live. Chartoff immediately stood out on the series, partly thanks to her regular role as the anchor on the show's fake newscasts, but also due to her comedic skills (particularly an impression of Nancy Reagan). In one sketch, Melanie was cold-cocked on live TV when co-star Maryedith Burrell failed to pull her punch during a skit and chipped Chartoff's tooth.

Between the demise of Fridays in 1982 and her return to a regular series in 1990 with Parker Lewis Can't Lose (in which she co-starred for three seasons as the high-strung Principal Grace Musso), Chartoff continued to work steadily on television throughout the 1980s, including appearances on Mr. Belvedere, Wiseguy, Wonder Woman, and St. Elsewhere, as well as a recurring role on Newhart as Dr. Kaiser. She made two appearances on Seinfeld, including one in the 1998 series finale in which four of her former Fridays co-stars were also involved (including Michael Richards). She appeared in the 2006 season finale of Desperate Housewives.

In the Los Angeles premiere of Bill Finn and James Lapine's musical March of the Falsettos (1982), for which she won a Drama-Logue Award, she played Trina. She played Mary Jane Wilkes in the La Jolla Playhouse premiere of Big River (1984). At South Coast Repertory she appeared in the world Premiere of On the Jump. She played Dot in the West Coast premiere of Sunday in the Park with George at San Francisco's American Conservatory Theater (1986).

=== Inventing ===
In 1991, Chartoff and fellow voice actor Michael Bell conceived the Grayway Rotating Drain, a device that recycles shower and sink greywater to flush toilets in the home. In 1992 they collaborated with Ronald K. Ford who applied for, and in 1994 received a patent on the product.

=== Voice acting and other projects ===
Chartoff's first voice-over work was a guest role on Challenge of the Superfriends. She has continued her work as an in-demand voice actress and also takes occasional TV and stage roles. Chartoff works as a coach to both actors and non-actors to make them more charismatic in public performances. In 2005, she interviewed Laraine Newman for Autograph Collector magazine. Chartoff writes for The Huffington Post, The Jewish Journal, Defenestration Magazine, and The Funny Times. She performs her original material at such Los Angeles venues as Comedy Central's "Sit n' Spin," "Tasty Words," and "I Love a Good Story."

=== Rugrats ===
From 1991 to 2008, Chartoff voiced Didi Pickles and her mother Grandma Minka on the Nickelodeon series Rugrats, for which she won a Daytime Emmy. She continued to voice Didi on the Rugrats spin-off series, All Grown Up!. For the 2021 revival series of the same name, Chartoff was replaced by actress Ashley Spillers.

=== Awards ===
Aside from Drama-Logue and Daytime Emmy Awards, she was awarded by the City of Hope for creating and producing the yearly event Halloween for Hope to benefit children's cancer research and received a Certificate of Appreciation from the Mayor of Los Angeles for her concerts for the homeless. Chartoff is listed in Who's Who in California, and Who's Who in American Colleges and Universities.

== Personal life ==
On July 5, 2013, Chartoff married psychologist Stan Friedman, her longtime boyfriend.

== Filmography ==
=== Film ===
Year	Title	Role	Notes
1978	American Hot Wax	Debbie	Film debut
1979	Can You Hear the Laughter? The Story of Freddie Prinze	Fan	Television film, uncredited
1982	Having It All	Dace	Television film
1985	Doin' Time	Linda Libel	
1986	Stoogemania	Beverly	
1986	Hardesty House	Judy Werner	Television film
1987	Kenny Rogers as The Gambler, Part III: The Legend Continues	Deborah	Television film
1993	Wind in the Wire	unknown role	Television film
1997	Plato's Run	Stephanie	Direct-to-video
1998	The Rugrats Movie	Didi Pickles, Minka	Voice
2000	Big Brother Trouble	Frances Dobson	
2000	Rugrats in Paris: The Movie	Didi Pickles	Voice
2001	The Rugrats: All Growed Up	Didi Pickles	Voice, television film
2003	Rugrats Go Wild	Didi Pickles	Voice
2006	Dr. Dolittle 3	Black and White Hen	Voice, direct-to-video
2012	And Out, Into the Bright Sky	unknown role	Short film
2017	Alexander IRL	Maureen Finn	

=== Television ===
Year	Title	Role	Notes
1976	Search for Tomorrow	Nancy Craig	Television debut
1973	The Doctors	Nurse (uncredited)	Episode: "#1.2824"
1978	Wonder Woman	Nadia	Episode: "Screaming Javelins"
1978	The Tony Randall Show	Ginny	Episode: "Adios, Mr. Chips"
1978	Richie Brockelman, Private Eye	Police-Woman Ronnie	Episode: "Escape from Caine Abel"
1978–80	Challenge of the Superfriends	Additional voices	16 episodes
1980–82	Fridays	Various	54 episodes
1983	Oh Madeline	unknown role	Episode: "Sisters"
1985	Mr. Belvedere	Detective Wentworth	Episode: "What I Did for Love"
1985	St. Elsewhere	Kate Larson	Episode: "Fathers and Sons"
1986	The Love Boat	Betty Bell	Episode: "Hippies and Yuppies/Frat Wars/Return of the Lambdas"
1986	Fresno	Desiree DeMornay	Miniseries; 5 episodes
1987	Take Five	Laraine McDermott	Recurring role, 6 episodes
1987–90	Newhart	Dr. Mary Kaiser	Recurring role, 5 episodes
1988	Wiseguy	Lillah Warfield	Recurring role, 3 episodes
1989	The Super Mario Bros. Super Show!	Tawny Tyler	Episode: "Adee Don't/Karate Koopa"
1990	The Fanelli Boys	Becky	Episode: "Pilot"
1990–93	Parker Lewis Can't Lose	Principal Grace Musso	72 episodes
1991–2004	Rugrats	Didi Pickles, Minka Kropotkin, additional voices	Voice, 155 episodes
1993	Married... with Children	Laurie Diamond, Attorney	Episode: "Un-Alful Entry"
1994	Living Single	Madeline Flayvin	Episode: "They've Gotta Have It"
1994, 1998	Seinfeld	Robin	2 episodes
1996–98	Weird Science	Marcia Donnelly	recurring role; 5 episodes
1996–99	Jumanji	Aunt Nora Shepherd	Voice, 22 episodes
1998	Ally McBeal	Joanne Poole	Episode: "Happy Trails"
2000	Touched by an Angel	Connie Burger	Episode: "Bar Mitzvah"
2000	Happily Ever After: Fairy Tales for Every Child	Grape Fox	Voice, episode: "Aesop's Fables: A Whodunit Musical"
2001	JAG	Senator Anne Pick	Episode: "Ambush"
2002	Taina	Sasha Simmons	Episode: "Desperately Seeking Agent"
2002	The Zeta Project	Lead Scientist	Voice, episode: "Cabin Pressure"
2002	Body & Soul	Colleen McKinney	Episode: "Letting Go"
2002	Half & Half	Bridget	Episode: "The Big in with the in Crowd Episode"
2003–08	All Grown Up!	Didi Pickles, Minka Kropotkin	Voice, 32 episodes
2005	Unfabulous	Health Teacher	Episode: "The Little Sister"
2006	Desperate Housewives	Sally	Episode: "Remember (Part 1)"
2007	Tak & the Power of Juju	Chief Tina-Tina	Voice, episode: "The Three Chiefs"
2010	No Ordinary Family	Iris Mitchell	Episode: "Pilot"
2014	Extraordinary Faith		Director/Consulting Producer Television Documentary; 2 episodes
2015	Switched at Birth	Producer	Episode: "There Is My Heart"
2018	OK K.O.! Let's Be Heroes	Sunshine	Voice, 4 episodes

=== Video games ===
Year	Title	Role	Notes
1998	Rugrats Adventure Game	Didi Pickles	
1998	Rugrats: Search for Reptar	Didi Pickles	
1999	Rugrats: Studio Tour	Didi Pickles	
