= Baptism (Kenny Chesney and Randy Travis song) =

Song by Kenny Chesney and Randy Travis

from the album Everywhere We Go
- Language: English
- Released: March 2, 1999
- Recorded: 1999
- Genre: Country, Christian country
- Length: 4:15
- Label: BNA
- Songwriter: Mickey Cates
- Producers: Buddy Cannon, Norro Wilson

"Baptism", also known as "Down with the Old Man (Up with the New)", is a song written by Mickey Cates, depicting a believer's baptism down in an East Tennessee river.

In 1999, the song was recorded by Kenny Chesney and Randy Travis on the album Everywhere We Go and in 2000, Randy Travis recorded it on the album Inspirational Journey. The solo version was released as a single, peaking at 75th position at the country singles chart of the United States.

In 2001 the Randy Travis solo recording was awarded an GMA Dove Award in the "Country Song of the Year" category.

In 1999 the song was recorded by Susie Luchsinger on the album Raised on Faith.

== Chart performance ==
=== Randy Travis solo version ===
Chart (2000)	Peak position
US Hot Country Songs (Billboard)	75
