= An Old Time Christmas =

Studio album by Randy Travis
- Released: August 14, 1989
- Genre: Country
- Length: 27:46 (original release) 37:24 (2021 deluxe edition)
- Label: Warner Bros. Nashville
- Producer: Kyle Lehning

Randy Travis chronology
Old 8×10 (1988)	An Old Time Christmas (1989)	No Holdin' Back (1989)

Singles from An Old Time Christmas
- 1. "White Christmas Makes Me Blue" Released: December 8, 1986; 2. "An Old Time Christmas" Released: November 21, 1988; 3. "How Do I Wrap My Heart Up for Christmas" Released: November 21, 1988; 4. "Oh, What a Silent Night" Released: December 4, 1989

Professional ratings
Review scores
Source	Rating
AllMusic	3/5 stars
Chicago Tribune	3/4 stars

An Old Time Christmas is the fourth studio album and the first Christmas album released by country music artist Randy Travis. The album, originally released in 1989, was certified Gold by the RIAA. On November 19, 2021, Travis released a remastered deluxe edition featuring three never-before-released songs.

== Track listing ==
No.	Title	Writer(s)	Length
1.	"An Old Time Christmas"	Stewart Harris	3:13
2.	"Winter Wonderland"	Felix Bernard; Dick Smith	2:22
3.	"Meet Me Under the Mistletoe"	Joe Collins; Mark Irwin; Betsy Jackson	2:43
4.	"White Christmas Makes Me Blue"	Rich Grissom; Neil Patton Rogers	3:25
5.	"Santa Claus Is Coming to Town"	J. Fred Coots; Haven Gillespie	2:05
6.	"God Rest Ye Merry Gentlemen"	Traditional	2:45
7.	"Pretty Paper"	Willie Nelson	2:38
8.	"Oh, What a Silent Night"	Mark Collie; Kathy Louvin	2:32
9.	"How Do I Wrap My Heart Up for Christmas"	Paul Overstreet; Randy Travis	2:47
10.	"The Christmas Song"	Mel Tormé; Robert Wells	3:16

2021 Remastered Deluxe Edition
No.	Title	Writer(s)	Length
11.	"Little Toy Trains"	Roger Miller	2:24
12.	"There's A New Kid In Town"	Don Cook; Curly Putman; Keith Whitley	3:48
13.	"White Christmas"	Irving Berlin	3:26

== Personnel ==
- Baillie & the Boys – background vocals
- Eddie Bayers – drums
- Dennis Burnside – keyboards
- Larry Byrom – acoustic guitar
- Mark Casstevens – acoustic guitar
- Carol Chase – background vocals
- Jerry Douglas – dobro
- Steve Gibson – bouzouki, acoustic guitar, electric guitar
- Doyle Grisham – steel guitar
- Sherilyn Huffman – background vocals
- David Hungate – bass guitar
- Teddy Irwin – acoustic guitar
- Greg Jennings – electric guitar
- Kirk "Jelly Roll" Johnson – harmonica
- Wendy Suits Johnson – background vocals
- Jerry Kroon – drums
- Larrie Londin – drums
- Terry McMillan – harmonica, percussion
- Brent Mason – electric guitar
- Farrell Morris – percussion
- Mark O'Connor – fiddle
- Hargus "Pig" Robbins – keyboards
- Lisa Silver – background vocals
- James Stroud – drums
- Randy Travis – acoustic guitar, lead vocals
- Dianne Vanette – background vocals
- Cindy Richardson-Walker – background vocals
- Jack Williams – bass guitar

== Charts ==
=== Weekly charts ===
Chart (1989)	Peak position
Canadian Albums (RPM)	49
US Billboard 200	70
US Top Country Albums (Billboard)	13
US Top Holiday Albums (Billboard)	5

=== Year-end charts ===
Chart (1990)	Position
US Top Country Albums (Billboard)	75

== Certifications ==
Region	Certification	Certified units/sales
United States (RIAA)	Gold	500,000^{^}
^{^} Shipments figures based on certification alone.
