= Glory Train: Songs of Faith, Worship, and Praise =

Studio album by Randy Travis
- Released: October 25, 2005
- Genre: Country, gospel
- Label: Word/Warner Bros. Nashville/Curb
- Producer: Kyle Lehning

Randy Travis chronology
Passing Through (2004)	Glory Train: Songs of Faith, Worship, and Praise (2005)	Songs of the Season (2007)

Professional ratings
Review scores
Source	Rating
Allmusic	4/5 stars

Glory Train: Songs of Faith, Worship, and Praise is the seventeenth studio album released by American country music artist Randy Travis. It is his fifth album of gospel music and his fifth release for Word Records. The album comprises nineteen covers of traditional and contemporary gospel songs. No singles were released from it.

== Track listing ==
1. "This Train" (Sister Rosetta Tharpe) – 3:40
2. "Swing Down Chariot" (traditional) – 3:12
3. "Precious Memories" (Tharpe) – 4:13
4. "Shout to the Lord" (Darlene Zschech) – 4:21
5. "Down by the Riverside" (Tharpe) – 3:06
6. "Nothing but the Blood" (Robert Lowry) – 2:32
7. "Were You There?" (traditional) – 3:52
8. "Up Above My Head (I Hear Music in the Air)" (Tharpe) – 2:55
9. "He's Got the Whole World in His Hands" (traditional) – 2 :19
10. "Heart of Worship" (Matt Redman) – 3:53
11. "Jesus on the Main Line" (traditional) – 2:31
12. "Through the Fire" (Gerald Crabb) – 3:27
13. "Here I Am to Worship" (Tim Hughes) – 3:59
14. "Oh Death" (Crabb) – 2:46
15. "Nobody Knows, Nobody Cares" (Tharpe) – 3:11
16. "Since Jesus Came into My Heart" (Charles H. Gabriel, Rufus H. Gabriel) – 3:23
17. "Oh How I Love Jesus" (Frederick Whitfield) – 2:45
18. "Are You Washed in the Blood" (traditional) – 3:08
19. "Precious Lord, Take My Hand" (Thomas A. Dorsey) – 3:21

== Personnel ==
- Al Anderson - acoustic guitar
- Larry Beaird - acoustic guitar
- The Blind Boys of Alabama - background vocals (2, 8)
- Sidney Cox - background vocals
- Suzanne Cox - background vocals
- The Crabb Family - background vocals (12)
- Dennis Crouch - upright bass
- Eric Darken - bells, cajón, chimes, clay drums, cymbals, djembe, bass drum, snare drum, hand drums, jews harp, shaker, tambourine, timpani, vibraphone
- Billy Davis - background vocals
- Chip Davis - background vocals
- Craig Duncan - Hammer Dulcimer
- Connie Ellisor - violin
- Larry Franklin - fiddle, mandolin
- Paul Franklin - pedabro
- Carl Gorodetzky - string contractor, violin
- Jim Grosjean - viola
- Pastor Matthew Hagee - background vocals
- Vicki Hampton - background vocals
- Tony Harrell - accordion, harmonium
- Wes Hightower - background vocals
- Kirk "Jelly Roll" Johnson - harmonica, bass harmonica
- Christina Ketterling - background vocals
- Randy Kohrs - dobro
- Anthony LaMarchina - cello
- Brent Mason - acoustic guitar, gut string guitar
- Lisa Silver - background vocals
- Pam Sixfin - violin
- Bryan Sutton - Archguitar, banjo, 12-string guitar, acoustic guitar, resonator guitar, hi-string acoustic guitar, mandolin, soloist
- Randy Travis - lead vocals
- Cindy Richardson-Walker - background vocals
- Bergen White - string arrangements
- Kris Wilkinson - viola
- Casey Wood - bells, snare drum, hi-hat, tambourine

== Charts ==
=== Weekly charts ===
Chart (2005)	Peak position
US Billboard 200	128
US Christian Albums (Billboard)	7
US Top Country Albums (Billboard)	28

=== Year-end charts ===
Chart (2006)	Position
US Top Country Albums (Billboard)	71

== Awards ==
In 2006, the album won a Dove Award for Country Album of the Year at the 37th GMA Dove Awards.
