= Passing Through (Randy Travis album) =

Studio album by Randy Travis
- Released: November 9, 2004
- Recorded: September 2001–June 2004
- Studio: Sound Emporium, The Compound, The Electric Sandbox and Cartee Day Studios (Nashville, Tennessee): Stepbridge Studios (Santa Fe, New Mexico)
- Genre: Country
- Length: 42:28
- Label: Word
- Producer: Kyle Lehning

Randy Travis chronology
The Very Best of Randy Travis (2004)	Passing Through (2004)	Glory Train: Songs of Faith, Worship, and Praise (2005)

Professional ratings
Review scores
Source	Rating
About.com	5/5 stars
AllMusic	3.5/5 stars
CCM Magazine	B+
Robert Christgau	(1-star Honorable Mention)
Christianity Today	4/5 stars
Cross Rhythms	8/10 stars
People	4/4 stars

Passing Through is the sixteenth studio album by American country music artist Randy Travis. It was released on November 9, 2004, by Word Records. The album produced two singles on the Billboard country charts: "Four Walls" at No. 46 and "Angels" at No. 48. "That Was Us" was previously recorded by Tracy Lawrence on his 2001 album of the same name.

== Recording ==
Tracks 1, 2, 3, 6 & 11 were recorded in September 2001 at the Sound Emporium Studios in Nashville. The rest of the songs were recorded in June 2004 at Cartee Day Studios in Nashville. According to the liner notes, 20 songs were recorded for this album.

== Track listing ==
1. "Pick Up the Oars and Row" (Jamie O'Hara) – 2:50
2. "Four Walls" (Don Rollins, Harry Stinson, D. Vincent Williams) – 3:42
3. "That Was Us" (Craig Wiseman, Tony Lane) – 3:25
4. "Angels" (Harvey McNalley, Buck Moore, Troy Seals) – 3:46
5. "Running Blind" (Roger D. Ferris) – 2:52
6. "My Daddy Never Was" (Lane) – 3:56
7. "A Place to Hang My Hat" (Shawn Camp, Byron Hill, Brice Long) – 3:15
8. "Right On Time" (Al Anderson, Sharon Vaughn) – 3:58
9. "My Poor Old Heart" (Camp, Gary Harrison) – 2:46
10. "I'm Your Man" (Randy Travis) – 3:27
11. "Train Long Gone" (Dennis Linde) – 3:56
12. "I Can See It in Your Eyes" (Travis, Pastor Matthew Hagee) – 4:17

== Personnel ==
- Randy Travis – lead vocals
- John Barlow Jarvis – Wurlitzer electric piano (1), acoustic piano (2, 3, 11), Hammond B3 organ (3, 6)
- Tony Harrell – Hammond B3 organ (2, 4)
- Gordon Mote – acoustic piano (4, 7, 9, 10, 12)
- Matt Rollings – Roland Juno-60 (12), Hammond B3 organ (12)
- Pat Flynn – acoustic guitar (1–3, 6, 11)
- John Jorgenson – electric guitar (1–3, 6), electric slide guitar (11)
- Kyle Lehning – Hammertone electric guitar (2), Wurlitzer electric piano (6), electric guitar (11)
- Brent Mason – electric guitar (1–3, 5, 7, 9, 10)
- Larry Beaird – acoustic guitar (4, 5, 7, 9, 10, 12)
- Steve Gibson – electric guitar (4, 7, 9, 10, 12), acoustic guitar (9, 10), gut-string guitar (12)
- Bryan Sutton – acoustic guitar (4, 6, 7, 9), resonator guitar (8)
- Al Anderson – acoustic guitar (8), electric guitar (8), acoustic guitar solo (8)
- Johnny Hiland – electric guitar (12)
- Dan Dugmore – pedal steel guitar (1–3, 5, 6), acoustic guitar (11), electric guitar (11)
- Paul Franklin – pedal steel guitar (4, 7, 9, 10, 12)
- David Hungate – bass guitar (1–4, 6, 7, 9–12), upright bass (5)
- Viktor Krauss – upright bass (8)
- Paul Leim – drums (1–7, 9–12)
- Kenny Malone – drums (8), bells (8), tambourine (8)
- Eric Darken – percussion (1, 2, 5, 6, 10)
- Casey Wood – bass drum (6), tambourine (11)
- Larry Franklin – fiddle (1, 4, 5, 7, 9–11)
- Charlie McCoy – bass harmonica (5), harmonica (5)
- Wes Hightower – backing vocals (1–7, 9, 10)
- Vicki Hampton – backing vocals (2, 4, 8, 10)
- Lisa Silver – backing vocals (2, 4, 8, 10)
- Cindy Walker – backing vocals (2, 4, 8, 10)
- Dennis Linde – backing vocals (11)
- Liana Manis – backing vocals (12)

=== Production ===
- Shawn McSpadden – A&R direction
- Kyle Lehning – producer, mixing, vocal recording (1–3, 6, 11)
- Jason Lehning – recording (1–7, 9–12), vocal recording (4, 5, 7–10, 12)
- Scott Baggett – recording (8)
- Casey Wood – production assistant, mix assistant, recording assistant (1–7, 9–12), overdub recording (4, 5, 7–10, 12)
- Erick Jaskowiak – recording assistant (1–3, 6, 11)
- Steve Crowder – recording assistant (4, 5, 7, 9, 10)
- Michael Chavez – vocal recording assistant
- Robert Hadley – mastering
- Doug Sax – mastering
- The Mastering Lab (Hollywood, California) – mastering location
- Cheryl H. McTyre – A&R administration
- Mark Lusk – artist development
- Elizabeth Travis – creative director, stylist, management
- Richard Logsdon – design
- Eric Swanson – photography
- Phillip Ivey – hair, make-up

== Charts ==
=== Weekly charts ===
Chart (2004)	Peak position
US Billboard 200	127
US Christian Albums (Billboard)	6
US Top Country Albums (Billboard)	23

=== Year-end charts ===
Chart (2005)	Position
US Top Country Albums (Billboard)	65

== Awards ==
On 2005, the album won a Dove Award for Country Album of the Year at the 36th GMA Dove Awards.
