= Worship & Faith =

Studio album by Randy Travis
- Released: November 11, 2003
- Studios: Stepbridge Studios (Santa Fe, New Mexico): Little Big Sound Studios, Westwood Studios and The Compound (Nashville, Tennessee); G.E. TV (San Antonio, Texas)
- Genre: Country
- Length: 67:32
- Label: Word
- Producer: Kyle Lehning

Randy Travis chronology
Rise and Shine (2002)	Worship & Faith (2003)	The Very Best of Randy Travis (2004)

Professional ratings
Review scores
Source	Rating
AllMusic	4/5 stars

Worship & Faith is the fifteenth studio album by American country music artist Randy Travis. It was released on November 11, 2003, by Word Records. The album is composed of twenty covers of traditional gospel tunes as well as contemporary hymns. The DVD was recorded live in concert at the Orlando Calvary Assembly of God in Orlando, Florida, in July 2003. Worship & Faith is certified gold by the RIAA, although its only single, "Above All", failed to chart.

== Track listing ==
1. "He's My Rock, My Sword, My Shield" (Traditional) – 2:30
2. "Farther Along" (J.R. Baxter, W.B. Stevens) – 3:39
3. "How Great Thou Art" (Stuart K. Hine) – 4:29
4. "Just a Closer Walk with Thee" (Traditional) – 4:37
5. "Shall We Gather at the River?" (Robert Lowry) – 3:16
6. "You Are Worthy of My Praise" (David Ruis) – 4:18
7. "Love Lifted Me" (James Rowe, Howard Smith) – 3:11
8. "Softly and Tenderly" (Will L. Thompson) – 3:19
9. "Sweet By and By" (Sanford Filmore Bennett, Joseph Philbrock Webster) – 2:27
10. "Blessed Assurance" (Fanny J. Crosby, Phoebe Knapp) – 3:28
11. "I'll Fly Away" (Albert E. Brumley) – 2:59
12. "Turn Your Radio On" (Brumley) – 2:37
13. "Open the Eyes of My Heart" (Paul Baloche) – 3:55
14. "In the Garden" (C. Austin Miles) – 3:21
15. "Above All" (Baloche, Lenny LeBlanc) – 4:14
16. "Will the Circle Be Unbroken?" (Charles Gabriel, Ada R. Habershon) – 3:08
17. "We Fall Down" (Chris Tomlin) – 3:40
18. "Peace in the Valley" (Rev. Thomas A. Dorsey) – 3:58
19. "The Unclouded Day" (Josiah K. Alwood) – 2:56
20. "Room at the Cross for You" (Ira Stanphill) – 1:30

== Personnel ==
- Randy Travis – vocals
- Tony Harrell – accordion (2, 3, 6–8, 12, 20), harmonium (2, 3, 6–8, 12, 20)
- Larry Beaird – acoustic guitar
- Bryan Sutton – acoustic guitar (1–6, 9, 10, 12–15, 17, 18, 20), banjo (2, 3, 5, 7, 11, 13, 15, 16, 19), mandolin (2, 3, 5, 7, 11, 13, 15, 16, 19)
- Brent Mason – acoustic guitar solo (6, 7), acoustic guitar (8), gut-string guitar (20)
- Mark Lusk – acoustic guitar (11)
- Jerry Douglas – dobro (1, 2, 4, 12, 16, 19)
- Paul Franklin – pedalbro (7, 9, 14, 15, 17), Mel-o-bro (7, 9, 14, 15, 17), dobro (12, 17)
- Dennis Crouch – acoustic bass
- Eric Darken – percussion (1, 2, 4, 7, 9–11, 13, 15–18), handclaps (7)
- Casey Wood – handclaps (7), brush snare drum (12)
- Craig Duncan – hammered dulcimer (10, 17)
- Kirk "Jelly Roll" Johnson – harmonica (2, 4, 11, 18, 19)
- John Mock – bodhrán (10, 19), concertina (10, 19), tin whistle (10, 19)
- Larry Franklin – fiddle (1–5, 7–16, 18–20)
- Anthony LaMarchina – cello (6, 15)
- Kristin Wilkinson – viola (6, 15)
- David Angell – second violin (6, 15)
- David Davidson – first violin (6, 15)
- Don Hart – string arrangements (6, 15)
- Wes Hightower – backing vocals (1–5, 7–11, 14, 15, 18, 19)
- John Anderson – vocals (4)
- Mac Powell – vocals (7), backing vocals (7)
- Liana Manis – backing vocals (9, 10, 15, 18)
- Joy Lynn White – backing vocals (11)
- Billy Davis – backing vocals (12, 16)
- Chip Davis – backing vocals (12, 16)
- Pastor Matthew Hagee – backing vocals (13, 20)
- Sandra Hagee – backing vocals (13, 20)
- Christina Ketterling – backing vocals (13, 20)

Choir (Tracks 6 & 17)

- Shannon Sanders – choir arrangements
- Typharee Fitzgerald, Sharese "Reecy" Jackson and Cynthia Matthews – alto vocals
- Nirva Dorsaint, Paige Lackey Martin and Krystle Ochsner – soprano vocals
- Jason Eskridge, Shannon Sanders and Craig Watkins – tenor vocals

=== Production ===
- Shawn McSpadden – A&R direction
- Kyle Lehning – producer, recording, mixing, string recording (6, 15)
- Casey Wood – production assistant, recording, overdub recording, mix assistant, string recording (6, 15), choir recording (6, 17)
- Jason Lehning – vocal recording
- Jordan Lehning – overdub recording
- Mark Harrier – BGV recording (13, 20)
- Michael Chavez – recording assistant, additional recording
- Robin Abeles – vocal recording assistant
- Mel Eubanks – choir recording assistant (6, 17)
- Doug Sax – mastering at The Mastering Lab (Hollywood, California)
- Cheryl H. McTyre – A&R administration
- Mark Lusk – artist development
- Elizabeth Travis – creative director, creative coordinator, stylist, wardrobe, management
- Richard Logsdon – design
- Eric Swanson – photography
- Phillip Ivey – hair, make-up

== Chart performance ==
=== Weekly charts ===
Chart (2003)	Peak position
US Billboard 200	90
US Top Christian Albums (Billboard)	4
US Top Country Albums (Billboard)	9

=== Year-end charts ===
Chart (2004)	Position
US Top Country Albums (Billboard)	46

== Certifications ==
Region	Certification	Certified units/sales
United States (RIAA)	Gold	500,000^{^}
^{^} Shipments figures based on certification alone.
