= I Told You So: The Ultimate Hits of Randy Travis =

Greatest hits album by Randy Travis
- Released: March 17, 2009
- Genre: Country
- Label: Warner Bros. Nashville
- Producer: Kyle Lehning: "On the Other Hand" produced by Kyle Lehning and Keith Stegall; "It's Just a Matter of Time" produced by Richard Perry

Randy Travis chronology
Around the Bend (2008)	I Told You So: The Ultimate Hits of Randy Travis (2009)	Three Wooden Crosses: The Inspirational Hits of Randy Travis (2009)

Singles from I Told You So: The Ultimate Hits of Randy Travis
- 1. "Turn It Around" Released: March 12, 2009

I Told You So: The Ultimate Hits of Randy Travis is a compilation album released by country music artist Randy Travis in 2009. It consists of 32 songs overall in a two disc set. Two of the songs were never before released on albums. Travis' numerous number-one hits including "I Told You So", Deeper Than the Holler", "Forever and Ever, Amen" and "Three Wooden Crosses" are included on the album along with duets with country legends Tammy Wynette and George Jones. Travis' cover of Roger Miller's "King of the Road" is also included along with two tracks from his previous studio album Around the Bend.

"Turn It Around", which was also featured on Around the Bend was the album's startup single.

== Content ==
Travis and Underwood perform "I Told You So" on American Idol

Following his Grammy-nominated, high charting, studio album Around the Bend, which marked a return to mainstream country music, Travis released I Told You So concurrently with his compilation of Gospel music, Three Wooden Crosses: The Inspirational Hits of Randy Travis. I Told You So continued Travis' chart success, peaking at number-three on country album charts and number-16 on U.S. charts during its debut week.

A week prior to the album's release, Travis appeared on American Idol with country singer Carrie Underwood to sing a duet of the title track, "I Told You So." The pair had previously released the duet to radio, which peaked at number-one on Canadian charts, number-two on U.S. Country charts and reached number-nine on the Billboard Hot 100. Four days prior to the release, Travis appeared on The Tonight Show with Jay Leno to perform the album's single "Turn It Around" as well as his signature song, "Forever and Ever, Amen."

== Reception ==
Professional ratings
Review scores
Source	Rating
About.com	5/5 stars
Allmusic	4/5 stars
Country Weekly	4/5 stars

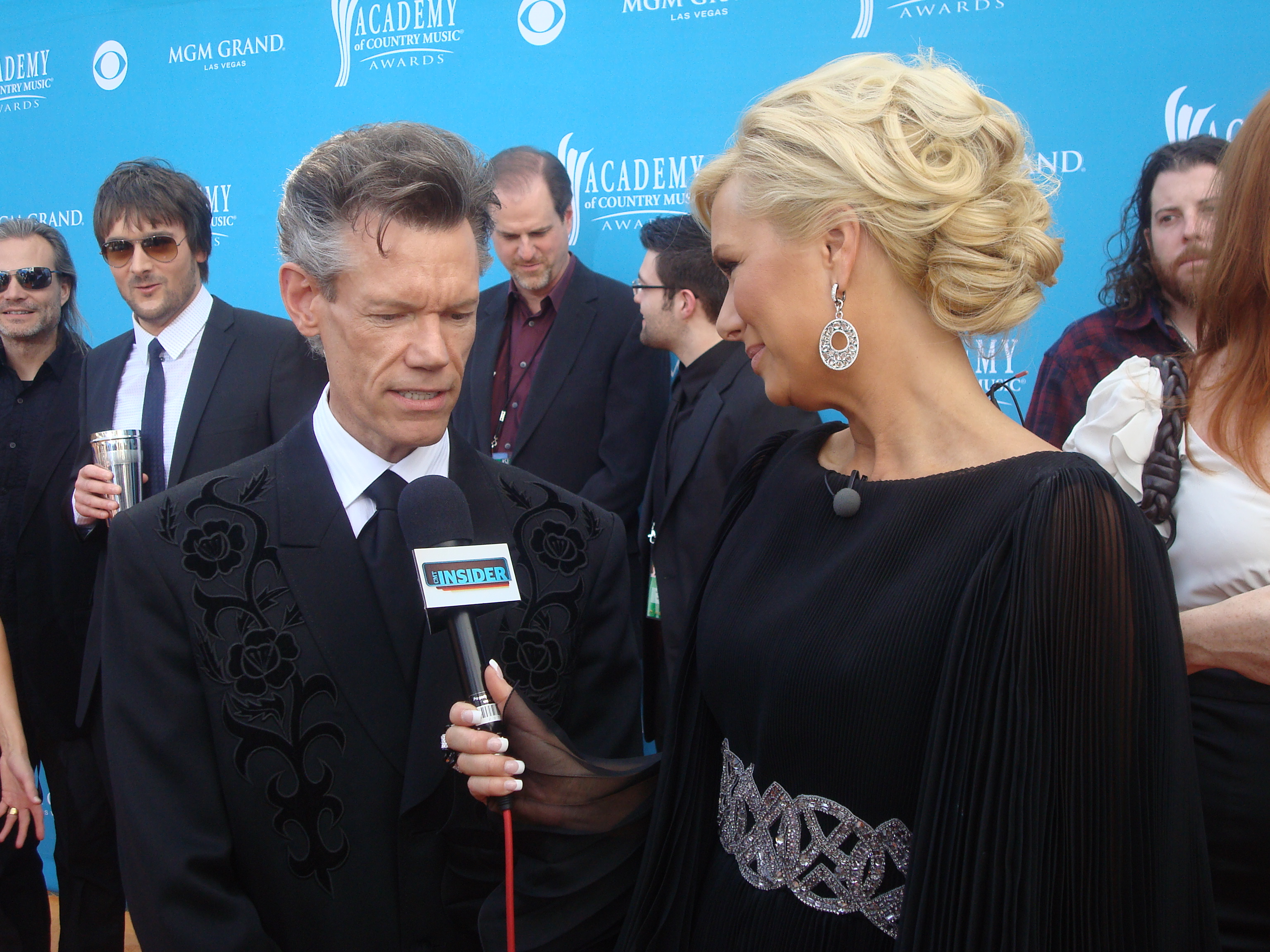
Randy Travis interviewed at the 2009 Academy of Country Music awards

Allmusic gave the album a favorable review, arguing that the essential tracks were the songs from Travis' album Storms of Life including "Diggin' Up Bones", "1982", "On the Other Hand" and "No Place Like Home", all of which with the exception of "1982" were written or co-written by singer-songwriter Paul Overstreet. "Whisper My Name", Travis' final American Number-one of the 1990s, was also mentioned in the review. Allmusic lauded the new traditional approach of Travis, which it cites as making "him still seem relevant and current even after all these years."

Roughstock.com also wrote a favorable review of the album. It assessed the two new tracks of the album, "Love's Alive and Well" and "You Ain't Right" as probable "future singles." The writer criticized Warner Bros. Records' decision to leave off Travis' major hit "Hard Rock Bottom of Your Heart", and was dismayed by the absence of songs during Travis' tenure with DreamWorks. However, the reviewer concludes that the album "is still a great introduction into one of the most influential Country singers of the last 30 years and he, not George Strait or Garth Brooks, was the first multi-platinum Country star. So it's fair to say that without Randy Travis we'd not have Country music as we now know it, an equally popular music format."

== Track listing ==
=== Disc one ===
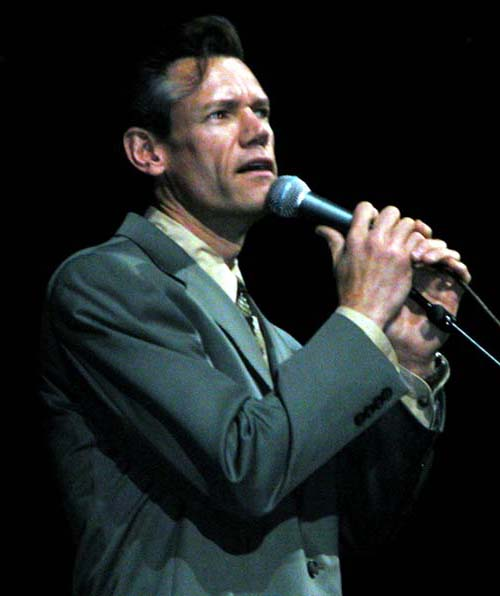
Travis performs "Three Wooden Crosses"

1. "Diggin' Up Bones" (Al Gore, Paul Overstreet, Nat Stuckey) – 3:01
2. "Forever and Ever, Amen" (Overstreet, Don Schlitz) – 3:33
3. "I Told You So" (Randy Travis) – 3:40
4. "He Walked on Water" (Allen Shamblin) – 3:25
5. "Promises" (John Lindley, Randy Travis) – 4:00
6. "Three Wooden Crosses" (Kim Williams, Doug Johnson) – 3:21
7. "Deeper Than the Holler" (Overstreet, Schlitz) – 3:40
8. "On the Other Hand" (Overstreet, Schlitz) – 3:07
9. "Too Gone Too Long" (Gene Pistilli) – 2:27
10. "We're Strangers Again" (Merle Haggard, Leona Williams) – 2:48
  - duet with Tammy Wynette
11. "Look Heart, No Hands" (Trey Bruce, Russell Smith) – 3:10
12. "1982" (Buddy Blackmon, Vip Vipperman) – 2:58
13. "Better Class of Losers" (Alan Jackson, Travis) – 2:41
14. "I Won't Need You Anymore (Always and Forever)" (Max D. Barnes, Troy Seals) – 3:11
15. "Faith in You" (Tom Douglas, Joe Henry, Matt Rollings) – 3:46
16. "Love's Alive and Well" (Steve Jones, John Scott Sherrill) – 3:18
  - previously released on the Four Walls EP

=== Disc two ===
1. "Honky Tonk Moon" (Dennis O'Rourke) – 2:50
2. "Would I" (Mark Winchester) – 2:25
3. "It's Just a Matter of Time" (Brook Benton, Belford Hendricks, Clyde Otis) – 3:57
4. "Forever Together" (Jackson, Travis) – 3:05
5. "No Place Like Home" (Overstreet) – 4:07
6. "A Few Ole Country Boys" (Seals, Mentor Williams) – 3:39
  - duet with George Jones
7. "Is It Still Over?" (Ken Bell, Larry Henley) – 3:12
8. "Whisper My Name" (Bruce) – 3:08
9. "Before You Kill Us All" (Barnes, Keith Follesé) – 3:20
10. "Heroes and Friends" (Schlitz, Travis) – 3:13
11. "This Is Me" (Thom McHugh, Tom Shapiro) – 3:25
12. "King of the Road" (Roger Miller) – 3:49
13. "The Box" (Buck A. Moore, Travis) – 3:22
14. "Are We in Trouble Now" (Mark Knopfler) – 4:21
15. "Turn It Around" (Noah Gordon, Matt Kennon) – 3:00
16. "You Ain't Right" (Kelley Lovelace, Phil O'Donnell, Tim Owens) – 3:30
  - previously unreleased

== Charts ==
=== Weekly charts ===
Chart (2009)	Peak position
US Billboard 200	21
US Top Country Albums (Billboard)	3

=== Year-end charts ===
Chart (2009)	Position
US Top Country Albums (Billboard)	57
Chart (2025)	Position
US Top Country Albums (Billboard)	67
