= Greatest Hits, Volume One (Randy Travis album) =

Compilation album

Compilation album by Randy Travis
- Released: September 15, 1992
- Genre: Country
- Length: 36:15
- Label: Warner Bros. Nashville
- Producer: Kyle Lehning: "On the Other Hand" and "Reasons I Cheat" produced by Kyle Lehning and Keith Stegall

Randy Travis chronology
High Lonesome (1991)	Greatest Hits, Volume One (1992)	Greatest Hits, Volume Two (1992)

Singles from Greatest Hits Volume One
- 1. "If I Didn't Have You" Released: August 3, 1992; 2. "An Old Pair of Shoes" Released: March 29, 1993

Professional ratings
Review scores
Source	Rating
Allmusic	link
Entertainment Weekly	A− link
Robert Christgau	A link

Greatest Hits, Volume One is the first of two greatest hits albums released on the same day in 1992 by country music artist Randy Travis. Two new songs were recorded for this album and released as singles. "If I Didn't Have You" reached number 1 on the Billboard Hot Country Songs chart while "An Old Pair of Shoes" reached #21. Also included is "Reasons I Cheat" from Travis' 1986 debut album Storms of Life, although it was never released as a single. This album has been certified platinum by the RIAA.

== Track listing ==
No.	Title	Writer(s)	Length
1.	"If I Didn't Have You"	Max D. Barnes, Skip Ewing	3:05
2.	"1982"	Buddy Blackmon, Vip Vipperman	2:58
3.	"Hard Rock Bottom of Your Heart" (Single Remix)	Hugh Prestwood	3:57
4.	"On the Other Hand"	Paul Overstreet, Don Schlitz	3:05
5.	"Honky Tonk Moon"	Dennis O'Rourke	2:49
6.	"An Old Pair of Shoes"	Jerry Foster, Art Masters, Johnny Morris	2:54
7.	"I Told You So" (Single Remix)	Randy Travis	3:38
8.	"Too Gone Too Long"	Gene Pistilli	2:24
9.	"Heroes and Friends" (Long Single Edit)	Schlitz, Travis	3:16
10.	"Deeper Than the Holler"	Overstreet, Schlitz	3:39
11.	"Reasons I Cheat"	Travis	4:23

== Chart performance ==
Chart (1992)	Peak position
U.S. Billboard Top Country Albums	14
U.S. Billboard 200	44

== Certifications ==
Region	Certification	Certified units/sales
United States (RIAA)	Platinum	1,000,000^{^}
^{^} Shipments figures based on certification alone.
