= Greatest Hits, Volume Two (Randy Travis album) =

Compilation album by Randy Travis

Compilation album by Randy Travis
- Released: September 15, 1992
- Genre: Country
- Length: 33:45
- Label: Warner Bros. Nashville
- Producer: Kyle Lehning: "It's Just a Matter of Time" produced by Richard Perry

Randy Travis chronology
Greatest Hits, Volume One (1992)	Greatest Hits, Volume Two (1992)	Wind in the Wire (1993)

Singles from Greatest Hits Volume Two
- 1. "Look Heart, No Hands" Released: November 16, 1992

Professional ratings
Review scores
Source	Rating
Allmusic	5/5 stars
Entertainment Weekly	A−
Robert Christgau	A−

Greatest Hits, Volume 2 is the second of two greatest hits albums released on the same day in 1992 by country music artist Randy Travis. Three new songs were recorded for this album and one, "Look Heart, No Hands", was released as a single and reached No. 1 on the Billboard Hot Country Songs chart. The other newly recorded songs were "Take Another Swing at Me" and "I'd Do It All Again With You". This album has so far been Travis' last album to be certified platinum by the RIAA.

== Track listing ==
No.	Title	Writer(s)	Length
1.	"Look Heart, No Hands"	Trey Bruce, Russell Smith	3:10
2.	"Forever and Ever, Amen"	Paul Overstreet, Don Schlitz	3:33
3.	"No Place Like Home"	Overstreet	4:07
4.	"Is It Still Over?"	Ken Bell, Larry Henley	3:11
5.	"He Walked on Water"	Allen Shamblin	3:25
6.	"Take Another Swing at Me"	Paul Craft	2:12
7.	"Promises"	John Lindley, Randy Travis	4:00
8.	"Diggin' Up Bones"	Al Gore, Overstreet, Nat Stuckey	3:00
9.	"I Won't Need You Anymore (Always and Forever)"	Max D. Barnes, Troy Seals	3:11
10.	"It's Just a Matter of Time""	Brook Benton, Belford Hendricks, Clyde Otis	3:56
11.	"I'd Do It All Again With You"	Travis	2:30

== Chart performance ==
Chart (1992)	Peak position
U.S. Billboard Top Country Albums	20
U.S. Billboard 200	67
Canadian RPM Country Albums	4

== Certifications ==
Region	Certification	Certified units/sales
United States (RIAA)	Platinum	1,000,000^{^}
^{^} Shipments figures based on certification alone.
