= An Old Pair of Shoes =

Single by Randy Travis

from the album Greatest Hits, Volume One
- B-side: "Promises"
- Released: April 10, 1993
- Genre: Country
- Length: 2:54
- Label: Warner Bros. Nashville
- Songwriter(s): Jerry Foster, Art Masters, Johnny Morris
- Producer(s): Kyle Lehning

Randy Travis singles chronology
"Look Heart, No Hands" (1992)	"An Old Pair of Shoes" (1993)	"Cowboy Boogie" (1993)

"An Old Pair of Shoes" is a song recorded by American country music artist Randy Travis. It was released in April 1993 as the second single from his Greatest Hits, Volume One compilation album. The song reached #21 on the Billboard Hot Country Singles & Tracks chart. The song was written by Jerry Foster, Art Masters and Johnny Morris.

== Chart performance ==
Chart (1993)	Peak position
US Hot Country Songs (Billboard)	21
Canadian RPM Country Tracks	24
