= It Don't Get Any Better Than This =

Studio album by George Jones
- Released: April 7, 1998
- Genre: Country
- Length: 37:47
- Label: MCA Nashville
- Producer: Buddy Cannon; Norro Wilson

George Jones chronology
I Lived to Tell It All (1996)	It Don't Get Any Better Than This (1998)	Cold Hard Truth (1999)

Singles from It Don't Get Any Better Than This
- 1. "Wild Irish Rose" Released: March 1998

Professional ratings
Review scores
Source	Rating
Allmusic	2.5/5 stars

It Don't Get Any Better Than This is an album by American country music singer George Jones released on April 7, 1998, on the MCA Nashville label, Jones's last for the label.

"Wild Irish Rose" was released as a single, but failed to chart.

The song "It Don't Get Any Better Than This" includes several guest vocalists, including Waylon Jennings, the Johnny Cash impersonator, Johnny Counterfit (incorrectly credited as "Johnny Counterfeit" in the liner notes), Merle Haggard, Bobby Bare, and Willie Nelson. The song "Got to Get to Louisiana" is a duet with T. Graham Brown.

"When Did You Stop Loving Me" is a cover of the 1993 Top Ten single by George Strait from the soundtrack to the 1992 film Pure Country. "Small Y'all" was originally recorded by Randy Travis on his 1994 album This Is Me, and later re-recorded by Jones as a duet with Kenny Chesney on Chesney's 2010 album Hemingway's Whiskey. "Smack Dab" was later recorded by Ken Mellons on his 2004 album Sweet. "Don't Touch Me" is a cover of the 1966 #2 country hit single by Jeannie Seely. The album also features several songs written by Nashville veteran Bobby Braddock, who co-wrote "He Stopped Loving Her Today".

== Reception ==
AllMusic states of the album: "It's not a bad record by any means, and George is in surprisingly good voice, hardly sounding like a man approaching his 70th birthday. Still, there's no truly great performances or unusual songs to make it worth putting on after the initial play."

== Track listing ==
No.	Title	Writer(s)	Length
1.	"Wild Irish Rose"	Bobby Braddock	4:40
2.	"Small Y'all"	Braddock	2:46
3.	"Over You"	Braddock	3:56
4.	"It Don't Get Any Better Than This" (feat. Waylon Jennings, Johnny Counterfit, Merle Haggard, Bobby Bare & Willie Nelson)	Buddy Cannon, Norro Wilson, Max D. Barnes	3:07
5.	"Smack Dab"	T.W. Hale, Kerry Kurt Phillips	2:54
6.	"Don't Touch Me"	Hank Cochran	4:23
7.	"Got to Get to Louisiana" (duet with T. Graham Brown)	Steve Schuffert, Alexander Harvey	3:02
8.	"When Did You Stop Loving Me"	Monty Holmes, Donny Kees	3:42
9.	"I Said All That to Say All This"	Claire Davidson, Karyn Rochelle	2:34
10.	"No Future for Me in Our Past"	Glenn Martin, Leigh Dillard	2:59
11.	"I Can Live Forever"	Tony Stampley, Johnny Christopher, Bucky Lindsey	3:44

== Personnel ==
As listed in liner notes.

- Eddie Bayers – drums
- David Briggs – piano, Hammond B-3 organ
- Buddy Cannon – acoustic guitar
- Mark Casstevens – acoustic guitar
- Larry Franklin – fiddle
- Keith Gattis – electric guitar
- Carl Gorodetzky – orchestra conductor
- Randy Howard – fiddle, mandolin
- John Hughey – pedal steel guitar
- George Jones – vocals
- Paul Leim – drums, tambourine
- Terry McMillan – harmonica
- Larry Marrs – backing vocals
- Farrell Morris – vibraphone
- Louis Dean Nunley – backing vocals
- Jennifer O'Brian – backing vocals
- Larry Paxton – bass guitar, baritone guitar
- Hargus "Pig" Robbins – piano
- John Wesley Ryles – background vocals
- Scott Sanders – steel guitar
- Gary Smith – piano, clavinet
- Wayne Toups – accordion
- Pete Wade – electric guitar
- Bergen White – backing vocals, string arrangements
- Dennis Wilson – backing vocals
- Nashville String Machine – string orchestra
