= If I Didn't Have You =

If I Didn't Have You may refer to:

- "If I Didn't Have You" (Disney song), written by Randy Newman and performed by John Goodman and Billy Crystal from the film Monsters, Inc.
- "If I Didn't Have You" (Randy Travis song), from the album Greatest Hits, Volume 1
- "If I Didn't Have You" (Thompson Square song), from the album Just Feels Good
- "If I Didn't Have You", a song by Amanda Marshall from the album Tuesday's Child
- "If I Didn't Have You", a song by Tim Minchin from the album Ready for This?
- "If I Didn't Have You", a song from the Warner Bros. animated film Quest for Camelot
- "If I Didn't Have You", a song by Yip Harburg and Milton Ager sung by Ruth Etting and 1930's big bands
