= Three Wooden Crosses: The Inspirational Hits of Randy Travis =

Greatest hits album by Randy Travis
- Released: March 2009
- Genre: Gospel
- Length: 66:09
- Label: Warner Bros. Nashville
- Producer: Kyle Lehning

Randy Travis chronology
I Told You So: The Ultimate Hits of Randy Travis (2009)	Three Wooden Crosses: The Inspirational Hits of Randy Travis (2009)	Anniversary Celebration (2011)

Three Wooden Crosses: The Inspirational Hits of Randy Travis is a compilation album by Randy Travis. Released in March 2009 by Word/Curb/Warner Bros., the album contains some of Travis' most popular gospel songs.

== Track listing ==
1. "Three Wooden Crosses" (Kim Williams and Doug Johnson) – 3:22
2. "Four Walls" (Don Rollins, Harry Stinson and D. Vincent Williams) – 3:43
3. "Angels" (Harvey McNalley, Buck Moore and Troy Seals) – 3:46
4. "Just a Closer Walk with Thee" (Traditional) – 4:37
5. "In the Garden" (Charles Austin Miles) – 3:21
6. "Faith in You" (Tom Douglas, Joe Henry and Matt Rollins) – 3:46
7. "Love Lifted Me" (James Rowe and Howard E. Smith) – 3:11
8. "Blessed Assurance" (Fanny Crosby and Phoebe P. Knapp) – 3:34
9. "Softly and Tenderly" (Will L. Thompson) – 3:20
10. "Raise Him Up" (Robert Wilson Royer and Melvern Rivers Rutherford II) – 4:05
11. "He's My Rock, My Sword, My Shield" (Public Domain) – 2:30
12. "Sweet By and By" (Joseph P. Webster and S. Fillmore Bennett) – 2:27
13. "Everywhere We Go" (Michael Curtis and Randy Travis) – 2:33
14. "Rise and Shine" (Michael Curtis and Randy Travis) – 3:02
15. "Were You There?" (Unknown author) – 3:53
16. "He's Got the Whole World in His Hands" (Traditional) – 2:20
17. "Shall We Gather at the River?" (Robert Lowry) – 3:16
18. "Pray for the Fish" (Phillip Moore, Dan Murph and Ray Scott) – 3:02
19. "Swing Down Sweet Chariot" (Traditional) – 3:13
20. "Will the Circle Be Unbroken?" (Ada R. Habershon and Charles H. Gabriel) – 3:08

== Chart performance ==
Chart (2009)	Peak position
U.S. Billboard Top Christian Albums	16
U.S. Billboard Top Country Albums	31
