= Old 8×10 =

Studio album by Randy Travis
- Released: July 12, 1988
- Recorded: 1987–1988
- Genre: Country
- Length: 32:35
- Label: Warner Bros. Nashville
- Producer: Kyle Lehning

Randy Travis chronology
Always & Forever (1987)	Old 8×10 (1988)	An Old Time Christmas (1989)

Alternative cover
- International Cover

Singles from Old 8x10
- 1. "Honky Tonk Moon" Released: July 18, 1988; 2. "Deeper Than the Holler" Released: November 7, 1988; 3. "Is It Still Over?" Released: February 27, 1989; 4. "Promises" Released: June 26, 1989

Professional ratings
Review scores
Source	Rating
AllMusic	4.5/5 stars
Robert Christgau	A−
Los Angeles Times	3.5/4 stars
Rolling Stone	3/5 stars

Old 8×10 is the third studio album by American country music artist Randy Travis. It was released on July 12, 1988, by Warner Records. The album produced the singles "Honky Tonk Moon", "Deeper Than the Holler", "Is It Still Over", and "Promises". All of these except "Promises" reached Number One on the Hot Country Songs charts in the late 1980s. The British and German editions of the album (the first Randy Travis release in the latter) contained the bonus track "Forever and Ever, Amen". In January 1990, Old 8×10 earned Travis three American Music Awards for 'Favorite Country Male Artist', 'Favorite Country Album', and 'Favorite Country Single' (Deeper Than the Holler).

== Track listing ==
No.	Title	Writer(s)	Length
1.	"Honky Tonk Moon"	Dennis O'Rourke	2:49
2.	"Deeper Than the Holler"	Paul Overstreet; Don Schlitz	3:39
3.	"It's Out of My Hands"	John Lindley; Randy Travis	4:11
4.	"Is It Still Over?"	Ken Bell; Larry Henley	3:11
5.	"Old 8×10"	Joe Chambers; Larry Jenkins	2:57
6.	"Written in Stone"	Mac McAnally; Schlitz	3:14
7.	"The Blues in Black and White"	Wayland Holyfield; Verlon Thompson	2:59
8.	"Here in My Heart"	David Lynn Jones	3:11
9.	"We Ain't Out of Love Yet"	Larry Henley; Gene Pistilli	2:23
10.	"Promises"	Lindley; Travis	4:01

== Personnel ==
- Baillie & the Boys - background vocals
- Eddie Bayers - drums
- Michael Brooks - background vocals
- Dennis Burnside - piano
- Larry Byrom - acoustic guitar
- Mark Casstevens - acoustic guitar
- Jerry Douglas - Dobro
- Béla Fleck - banjo
- Paul Franklin - Pedabro
- Steve Gibson - acoustic guitar, electric guitar
- Doyle Grisham - steel guitar
- David Hungate - bass guitar
- Teddy Irwin - acoustic guitar
- Shane Keister - piano
- Kyle Lehning - piano
- Dennis Locorriere - background vocals
- Larrie Londin - drums
- Brent Mason - acoustic guitar, electric guitar
- Terry McMillan - harmonica, percussion
- Mark O'Connor - fiddle
- Billy Puett - clarinet, bass clarinet
- Dennis Sollee - clarinet
- Randy Travis - lead vocals, acoustic guitar
- Jack Williams - bass guitar

== Charts ==
=== Weekly charts ===
Chart (1988)	Peak position
Canadian Country Albums (RPM)	1
Canadian Albums (RPM)	14
US Billboard 200	35
US Top Country Albums (Billboard)	1

=== Year-end charts ===
Chart (1988)	Position
US Top Country Albums (Billboard)	28
Chart (1989)	Position
US Top Country Albums (Billboard)	2
Chart (1990)	Position
US Top Country Albums (Billboard)	40

== Certifications ==
Region	Certification	Certified units/sales
Canada (Music Canada)	2× Platinum	200,000^{^}
United States (RIAA)	2× Platinum	2,000,000^{^}
^{^} Shipments figures based on certification alone.
