= The Best of Ken Mellons =

Studio album by Ken Mellons
- Released: April 3, 2001
- Genre: Country
- Label: Curb
- Producer: Jerry Cupit

Ken Mellons chronology
Where Forever Begins (1995)	The Best of Ken Mellons (2001)	Sweet (2004)

Professional ratings
Review scores
Source	Rating
Allmusic	link

The Best of Ken Mellons is an album, released in 2001, by American country music artist Ken Mellons. Despite its title, it is not a compilation album, but rather a studio album composed of nine new tracks and a dance mix of his 1994 hit "Jukebox Junkie". Prior to this album, Mellons had released a non-charting single in "Mr. DJ" for Curb, and after the release of this album, Mellons left the label.

== Track listing ==
1. "Jukebox Junkie (Dance Mix)" (Ken Mellons, Jerry Cupit, Janice Honeycutt) – 4:40
2. "Shame on Me" (Mellons, Buddy Brock) – 3:07
3. "Home Team" (Mellons, Cupit, Lee Thomas Miller) – 3:54
4. "Farmer's Daughter" (Mellons, Cupit) – 2:29
5. "Ladies Night" (Mellons, Cupit, Randy Roberts) – 3:51
6. "Can You Feel It" (Mellons, Cupit, Jobe Memarie) – 3:21
7. "Down to a Crawl" (Mellons, Cupit, David Brewer, Faye Brewer) – 3:24
8. "Bundle of Nerves" (Mellons, Cupit, Miller) – 2:55
9. "Was It Good for You" (Mellons, Cupit) – 3:11
10. "Cool as You" (Larry Boone, Billy Lawson) – 2:58
