= Rise and Shine (Randy Travis album) =

Studio album by Randy Travis
- Released: October 15, 2002
- Recorded: 2001–2
- Studio: Seventeen Grand Recording, Sound Emporium, East Iris Studios and The Compound (Nashville, TN): Stepbridge Studios (Santa Fe, NM)
- Genre: Country
- Length: 45:09
- Label: Word
- Producer: Kyle Lehning

Randy Travis chronology
Inspirational Journey (2000)	Rise and Shine (2002)	Worship & Faith (2003)

Singles from Rise and Shine
- 1. "Three Wooden Crosses" Released: November 11, 2002; 2. "Pray for the Fish" Released: July 21, 2003

Professional ratings
Review scores
Source	Rating
AllMusic	4/5 stars
Robert Christgau	(choice cut)
People	(favorable)

Rise and Shine is the fourteenth studio album by American country music artist Randy Travis. It was released on October 15, 2002, by Word Records. It produced the single "Three Wooden Crosses", which in 2003 became his first Number One single on the Hot Country Singles & Tracks (now Hot Country Songs) chart since 1994's "Whisper My Name". The only other single release from this album was "Pray for the Fish", which peaked at No. 48.

== Track listing ==
No.	Title	Writer(s)	Length
1.	"Raise Him Up"	Robb Royer, Rivers Rutherford	4:03
2.	"Rise and Shine"	Randy Travis, Mike Curtis	3:02
3.	"When Mama Prayed"	Paul Overstreet, Rory Feek	4:42
4.	"I'm Ready"	Travis, Ron Avis	2:56
5.	"Three Wooden Crosses"	Kim Williams, Doug Johnson	3:21
6.	"That's Jesus"	Travis, Curtis	2:57
7.	"Pray for the Fish"	Phillip Moore, Dan Murph, Ray Scott	3:01
8.	"Jerusalem's Cry"	Travis, Lance Dary, Pastor Matthew Hagee	3:56
9.	"Keep Your Lure in the Water"	Travis, Curtis, Pastor Jeff Perry	3:02
10.	"If You Only Knew"	Rob Mathes, Phil Naish	4:13
11.	"Everywhere We Go"	Travis, Curtis	2:32
12.	"The Gift"	Scott, Moore	3:11
13.	"Valley of Pain"	Mathes, Allen Shamblin	4:04

== Personnel ==
- Randy Travis – lead vocals
- John Barlow Jarvis – acoustic piano
- Gordon Mote – keyboards (1, 3, 5, 7, 8, 10, 12, 13)
- Pat Flynn – acoustic guitar (1–4, 6–13)
- John Jorgenson – electric guitars (1)
- Brent Mason – electric guitars (2–4, 6–13)
- Larry Beaird – acoustic guitar (5)
- Steve Gibson – electric guitars (5, 7), mandolin (5)
- Billy Joe Walker Jr. – acoustic guitar (7–10)
- Dan Dugmore – steel guitar (1)
- Paul Franklin – steel guitar (2–4, 6–13)
- Doyle Grisham – steel guitar (5)
- David Hungate – bass guitar
- Paul Leim – drums
- Eric Darken – percussion (2–8, 10–13)
- Nina Rodriguez – percussion (2, 3)
- Aubrey Haynie – fiddle (2, 3, 6–12)
- Pastor Matthew Hagee – backing vocals (1, 3, 4)
- Sandra Hagee – backing vocals (1, 3, 4)
- Vicki Hampton – backing vocals (1, 10, 13)
- Wes Hightower – backing vocals (1, 3, 5–12)
- Christina Ketterling – backing vocals (1, 3, 4)
- Lisa Silver – backing vocals (1, 10, 13)
- Cindy Walker – backing vocals (1, 10, 13)

String section on "If You Only Knew"

- Bergen White – arrangements
- Tom McAnich – copyist
- Bob Mason – cello
- Gary Vanosdale and Kris Wilkinson – viola
- David Davidson, Conni Ellisor, Carl Gorodetzky, Lee Larrison and Pamela Sixfin – violin

=== Production ===
- Barry Landis – executive producer
- Kyle Lehning – producer, mixing, string recording (10)
- Jason Lehning – engineer, vocal recording
- Steve Tillisch – engineer
- Casey Wood – overdub recording, assistant engineer, mix assistant, string recording assistant (10)
- Walker Barnard – vocal recording assistant
- Sang Park – string recording assistant (10)
- Robert Hadley – mastering
- Doug Sax – mastering
- The Mastering Lab (Hollywood, California) – mastering location
- Mark Lusk – artist development
- Tammie Harris Cleek – creative administrator
- Karrine Caulkins – art direction, design
- Buddy Jackson – art direction, design
- John Dolan – photography

== Charts ==
=== Weekly charts ===
Chart (2002–03)	Peak position
US Billboard 200	73
US Christian Albums (Billboard)	1
US Top Country Albums (Billboard)	8

=== Year-end charts ===
Chart (2003)	Position
US Top Country Albums (Billboard)	25
Chart (2004)	Position
US Top Country Albums (Billboard)	75

== Certifications ==
Region	Certification	Certified units/sales
United States (RIAA)	Gold	500,000^{^}
^{^} Shipments figures based on certification alone.
