= Inspirational Journey =

Studio album by Randy Travis
- Released: October 24, 2000
- Genre: Country
- Label: Word
- Producer: Kyle Lehning

Randy Travis chronology
A Man Ain't Made of Stone (1999)	Inspirational Journey (2000)	Rise and Shine (2002)

Professional ratings
Review scores
Source	Rating
About.com	(favorable) link
Allmusic	link
Country Weekly	(average) link
The Daily Vault	B link
Entertainment Weekly	C+ link
People	(favorable) link
PopMatters	(average) link
Robert Christgau	link

Inspirational Journey is the thirteenth studio album by American country music artist Randy Travis. It was released on October 24, 2000, by Word Records. The album was recorded during Travis's tenure on Warner Bros. in the late 1990s, but was not released until 2000.

"Baptism" as duet with Kenny Chesney, was included on Chesney's 1999 album Everywhere We Go, but is featured on Inspirational Journey as a solo by Travis. The song charted at No. 75 on the Billboard country charts. "Doctor Jesus" was originally recorded by Ken Mellons on his 1994 self-titled debut album. Waylon Jennings and his wife Jessi Colter are featured on "The Carpenter."

== Track listing ==
1. "Shallow Water" (Tom Kimmel) – 3:43
2. "Baptism" (Mickey Cates) – 4:11
3. "Which Way Will You Choose?" (Ron Block) – 2:41
4. "Doctor Jesus" (Tony Stampley, Justin Bolen) – 3:02
5. "Drive Another Nail" (Marty Raybon, Michael A. Curtis) – 3:29
6. "See Myself in You" (Tom Kimmel, Tom Prasada-Rao) – 3:54
7. "Feet on the Rock" (Troy Seals, Buck Moore) – 3:10
8. "Don't Ever Sell Your Saddle" (Kim Tribble, Bobby Whiteside) – 3:40
9. "The Carpenter" (Randy Travis, Ron Avis, Chip Taylor) – 3:17
  - featuring Waylon Jennings and Jessi Colter
10. "Walk with Me" (Travis, Les Bohan) – 2:58
11. "I Am Going" (Travis, Buck Moore) – 3:48
12. "Amazing Grace" (John Newton) – 3:25

== Personnel ==
- Larry Byrom - acoustic guitar
- Kevin Carroll - background vocals
- Mark Casstevens - acoustic guitar
- Jessi Colter - vocals on "The Carpenter"
- Jim Cox - keyboards
- Jerry Douglas - Dobro
- Thom Flora - background vocals
- Sonny Garrish - steel guitar
- Doyle Grisham - steel guitar
- Aubrey Haynie - fiddle
- David Hungate - bass guitar
- Waylon Jennings - vocals on "The Carpenter"
- Jason Lehning - omnichord
- Paul Leim - drums
- Chris Leuzinger - electric guitar
- Terry McMillan - harmonica, percussion
- Brent Mason - electric guitar
- Steve Nathan - piano
- Calvin Settles - background vocals
- Odessa Settles - background vocals
- Shirley Settles - background vocals
- Lisa Silver - background vocals
- Hank Singer - fiddle, mandolin
- Marty Stuart - mandolin
- Fred Tackett - acoustic guitar
- Randy Travis - lead vocals
- Robby Turner - steel guitar
- Cindy Richardson-Walker - background vocals
- Billy Joe Walker Jr. - electric guitar
- Glenn Worf - bass guitar

== Charts ==
=== Weekly charts ===
Chart (2000–2001)	Peak position
US Christian Albums (Billboard)	19
US Top Country Albums (Billboard)	34

=== Year-end charts ===
Chart (2001)	Position
US Top Country Albums (Billboard)	55
