= Sweet (Ken Mellons album) =

Studio album by Ken Mellons
- Released: July 27, 2004
- Genre: Country
- Label: Home
- Producer: Ken Mellons

Ken Mellons chronology
The Best of Ken Mellons (2001)	Sweet (2004)	Rural Route (2010)

Professional ratings
Review scores
Source	Rating
Country Weekly	3/5 stars

Sweet is the fourth studio album released by American country music artist Ken Mellons. Released in 2004, it contains the song "Paint Me a Birmingham", which was also recorded by Tracy Lawrence and released as a single. Mellons's rendition was also released shortly before Lawrence's. "Smack Dab" was previously recorded by George Jones on his 1998 album It Don't Get Any Better Than This.

== Track listing ==
1. "Smack Dab" (Kerry Kurt Phillips, T.W. Hale) – 3:02
2. "Just What I'm Wantin' to Do" (Ken Mellons, John Northrup) – 2:56
3. "Paint Me a Birmingham" (Buck Moore, Gary Duffy) – 3:48
4. "Climb My Tree" (Northrup, Billy Lawson, Dean Dillon) – 2:33
5. "Interstate Gypsy" (Mellons, Northrup, David Vowell) – 3:23
6. "You Can't Make My Heart Believe" (Mellons, Dillon, Northrup) – 3:39
7. "Sweet" (Walt Aldridge, Gary Baker, Greg Barnhill) – 4:00
8. "All I Need Is a Bridge" (Mellons, Northrup) – 4:24
9. "Single Again" (Billy Davis, David Rivers, Doug Graham) – 2:37
10. "Any Time, Any Place" (M.C. Potts, Northrup) – 3:11
11. "Institute of Honky Tonks" (Mellons, Northrup, Larry Alderman) – 3:03
  - Duet with George Jones
12. "If I've Learned Anything at All" (Mellons, Northrup, Dale Dodson) – 2:35

== Personnel ==
- Mike Chapman - bass guitar
- Larry Cordle - background vocals
- Glen Duncan - fiddle
- Terry Eldredge - background vocals
- Larry Franklin - fiddle
- Vince Gill - background vocals
- Owen Hale - drums
- Wes Hightower - background vocals
- Rebecca Lynn Howard - background vocals
- Bill Hullett - acoustic guitar
- Carl Jackson - banjo
- George Jones - background vocals
- Liana Manis - background vocals
- Brent Mason - electric guitar
- Ken Mellons - lead vocals
- Gordon Mote - keyboards
- John Wesley Ryles - background vocals
- Scotty Sanders - steel guitar
- Earl Scruggs - banjo
- Steve Turner - drums
