= High Lonesome (Randy Travis album) =

Studio album by Randy Travis
- Released: August 27, 1991
- Recorded: The Nightingale, Nashville Tracks 2 & 4 The Soundshop, Nashville Tracks 1, 3 & 10; Groundstar Lab, Nashville Tracks 5 - 9
- Genre: Country
- Length: 31:53
- Label: Warner
- Producer: Kyle Lehning

Randy Travis chronology
Heroes & Friends (1990)	High Lonesome (1991)	Greatest Hits, Volume One (1992)

Singles from High Lonesome
- 1. "Point of Light" Released: April 29, 1991; 2. "Forever Together" Released: September 9, 1991; 3. "Better Class of Losers" Released: December 9, 1991; 4. "I'd Surrender All" Released: March 23, 1992

Professional ratings
Review scores
Source	Rating
AllMusic	link
Robert Christgau	link
Entertainment Weekly	A− link
Q	link

High Lonesome is the seventh studio album by American country music artist Randy Travis. It was released on August 27, 1991, by Warner Records. Four singles were released from the album: "Forever Together" (No. 1 on the Billboard Hot Country Songs charts), "Better Class of Losers" (No. 2), "Point of Light" (No. 3), and "I'd Surrender All" (No. 20). All of these singles except "Point of Light" were co-written by Travis and Alan Jackson. Conversely, Travis co-wrote Jackson's 1992 No. 1 "She's Got the Rhythm (And I Got the Blues)", from his album A Lot About Livin' (And a Little 'bout Love).

== Track listing ==
No.	Title	Writer(s)	Length
1.	"Let Me Try"	Chuck Cannon, Allen Shamblin	4:03
2.	"Oh, What a Time to Be Me"	Randy Travis, Don Schlitz	3:35
3.	"Heart of Hearts"	Mike Henderson, Kevin Welch	2:41
4.	"Point of Light"	Schlitz, Thom Schuyler	3:34
5.	"Forever Together"	Travis, Alan Jackson	3:06
6.	"Better Class of Losers"	Travis, Jackson	2:41
7.	"I'd Surrender All"	Travis, Jackson	3:36
8.	"High Lonesome"	Gretchen Peters	3:27
9.	"Allergic to the Blues"	Jackson, Jim McBride	2:28
10.	"I'm Gonna Have a Little Talk" (featuring Take 6)	Schlitz, Travis	2:42

== Personnel ==
- Russ Barenberg – acoustic guitar
- Eddie Bayers – drums
- Dennis Burnside – piano
- Larry Byrom – acoustic guitar
- Mark Casstevens – acoustic guitar
- Marty Stuart - Mandolin “High Lonesome”
- Carol Chase – background vocals
- Jerry Douglas – dobro
- Buddy Emmons – steel guitar
- Steve Gibson – acoustic guitar, electric guitar
- Doyle Grisham – steel guitar
- Rob Hajacos – fiddle
- Sherilyn Huffman – background vocals
- David Hungate – bass guitar, emulator, trombone, trumpet
- Kyle Lehning – Wurlitzer
- Chris Leuzinger – acoustic guitar
- Paul Leim – drums
- Larrie Londin – drums
- Mac McAnally – acoustic guitar
- Terry McMillan – harmonica, percussion
- Brent Mason – six-string bass guitar, electric guitar
- Mark O'Connor – fiddle
- Hargus "Pig" Robbins – piano
- John Wesley Ryles – background vocals
- Randy Scruggs – acoustic guitar
- Lisa Silver – background vocals
- Harry Stinson – drums
- Take 6 – background vocals on "I'm Gonna Have a Little Talk"
- Randy Travis – lead vocals
- Dianne Vanette – background vocals
- Cindy Richardson-Walker – background vocals
- Billy Joe Walker Jr. – acoustic guitar
- John Willis – acoustic guitar, electric guitar
- Dennis Wilson – background vocals
- Curtis Young – background vocals

== Chart performance ==
=== Weekly charts ===
Chart (1991)	Peak position
Canadian Albums (RPM)	61
Canadian Country Albums (RPM)	10
US Billboard 200	43
US Top Country Albums (Billboard)	3

=== Year-end charts ===
Chart (1991)	Position
US Top Country Albums (Billboard)	56
Chart (1992)	Position
US Top Country Albums (Billboard)	43

== Certifications ==
Region	Certification	Certified units/sales
Canada (Music Canada)	Gold	50,000^{^}
United States (RIAA)	Platinum	1,000,000^{^}
^{^} Shipments figures based on certification alone.
