= Ken Mellons (album) =

Studio album by Ken Mellons
- Released: August 23, 1994
- Recorded: 1993–1994
- Studio: Woodland Digital Studios, Nashville, TN
- Genre: Country
- Label: Epic
- Producer: Jerry Cupit

Ken Mellons chronology
Ken Mellons (1994)	Where Forever Begins (1995)

Singles from Ken Mellons
- 1. "Jukebox Junkie" Released: July 18, 1994; 2. "Workin' for the Weekend" Released: March 25, 1995

Ken Mellons is the self-titled debut album of American country music artist Ken Mellons. Released in 1994 on Epic Records, it contains his single "Jukebox Junkie", a Top Ten hit on the Billboard Hot Country Singles & Tracks (now Hot Country Songs) charts. "Workin' for the Weekend", "I Can Bring Her Back", and "Lookin' in the Same Direction" were also released as singles.

"Doctor Jesus" was later recorded by Randy Travis for his 2000 album Inspirational Journey.

== Track listing ==
No.	Title	Writer(s)	Length
1.	"Jukebox Junkie"	Ken Mellons, Jerry Cupit, Janice Honeycutt	2:41
2.	"I Can Bring Her Back"	Mellons, Dale Dodson, Gene Simmons	3:57
3.	"Lookin' in the Same Direction"	Mellons, Dodson, Jimmy Melton	2:47
4.	"The Pleasure's All Mine"	Mellons, Cupit, Honeycutt	3:37
5.	"Workin' for the Weekend"	Mellons, Cupit, Honeycutt	2:21
6.	"Seven Lonely Days (Makes One Weak)"	Mellons, Dodson, Melton	3:05
7.	"Keepin' It Country"	Mellons, Cupit, Honeycutt	3:28
8.	"Learnin' to Live Without You"	Mellons, Simmons, Cupit, Dodson	3:06
9.	"Honky Tonk Teachers"	Mellons, Dodson, Cupit	2:35
10.	"Doctor Jesus"	Tony Stampley, Justin Thomas Bolen	3:13

== Personnel ==
- Ken Mellons: lead vocals
- Curtis Young, John Wesley Ryles, Carl Jackson, Doug Clements: background vocals
- Bobby All, Mike Elliott, Billy Joe Walker Jr.: acoustic guitar
- Brent Mason: electric guitar
- John Hughey: steel guitar
- Hank Singer: fiddle
- Steve Nathan: keyboards
- Glenn Worf: bass guitar
- Lonnie Wilson: drums, percussion

== Production ==
- Produced by Jerry Cupit
- Recording Engineers: Marty McClantoc, Alan Schulman
- Mix Engineers: Alan Schulman; assisted by Marty McClantoc & Amy Hughes
- Digital Editing: Don Cobb
- Mastered by Denny Purcell

== Chart performance ==
Chart (1994)	Peak position
U.S. Billboard Top Country Albums	42
U.S. Billboard Top Heatseekers	8
