= If I Didn't Have You (Randy Travis song) =

Single by Randy Travis

from the album Greatest Hits, Volume One
- B-side: "I'd Surrender All"/"I Told You So"
- Released: August 3, 1992
- Genre: Country
- Length: 3:07
- Label: Warner Bros. Nashville
- Songwriters: Skip Ewing, Max D. Barnes
- Producer: Kyle Lehning

Randy Travis singles chronology
"I'd Surrender All" (1992)	"If I Didn't Have You" (1992)	"Look Heart, No Hands" (1992)

"If I Didn't Have You" is a song written by Skip Ewing and Max D. Barnes, and recorded by American country music singer Randy Travis. It was released in August 1992 as the lead-off single from his Greatest Hits, Volume One compilation album. The song became Travis' thirteenth Number One single on the Hot Country Singles & Tracks (now Hot Country Songs) chart.

The song's verses are written with an unusual 7/4 meter, and the chorus is in common 4/4 time.

== Critical reception ==
Deborah Evans Price, of Billboard magazine reviewed the song favorably, saying that Travis "showcases his George Jones influence on a frolicking copyright, but he seems to strain in places." She goes on to call the song "hip musicianship."

== Music video ==
The music video was directed by Jim Shea and premiered in mid-1992.

== Chart positions ==
"If I Didn't Have You" debuted at number 65 on the U.S. Billboard Hot Country Singles & Tracks for the week of August 15, 1992.

Chart (1992)	Peak position
Canada Country Singles (RPM)	1
US Hot Country Songs (Billboard)	1

=== Year-end charts ===
Chart (1992)	Position
Canada Country Tracks (RPM)	9
US Country Songs (Billboard)	53
