= I Lived to Tell It All =

Studio album by George Jones
- Released: August 13, 1996
- Genre: Country
- Length: 32:22
- Label: MCA Nashville
- Producer: Norro Wilson

George Jones chronology
One (1995)	I Lived to Tell It All (1996)	It Don't Get Any Better Than This (1998)

Singles from I Lived to Tell It All
- 1. "Honky Tonk Song" Released: August 1996; 2. "Billy B. Bad" Released: November 1996

I Lived to Tell It All is an album by country music artist George Jones, released on August 13, 1996, on the MCA Nashville Records label. It was also a companion piece to his best-selling autobiography of the same name, I Lived to Tell It All.

== Reception ==
Professional ratings
Review scores
Source	Rating
Allmusic	link

AllMusic calls I Lived To Tell It All "a surprising return to form" for Jones, enthusing, "There are honky tonk raveups, there are heart-tugging barroom weepers, and, best of all, there are several novelties that rank among the most clever and self-deprecating that Jones has ever recorded." In a Rolling Stone article at the time of the album's release, Chuck Dean wrote that Jones was "...blessed with the best set of lungs this side of the cosmos..." Alana Nash of Amazon.com writes that, even when going through the motions, "Jones remains the kind of singer who inspires awe and wonder..."

== Track listing ==
No.	Title	Writer(s)	Length
1.	"Honky Tonk Song"	Frank J. Myers, Billy Yates	2:46
2.	"Back Down to Hung Up on You"	Larry Butler, Dean Dillon	3:37
3.	"Billy B. Bad"	Bobby Braddock	3:01
4.	"Hundred Proof Memories"	Keith Stegall, Zack Turner	3:56
5.	"It Ain't Gonna Worry My Mind"	Richard Leigh	2:55
6.	"The Lone Ranger"	Yates, Gerald Smith, John Northrup	2:38
7.	"Tied to a Stone"	Max D. Barnes	4:06
8.	"I'll Give You Something to Drink About"	Hank Cochran, Mack Vickery, Jerry Laseter	3:19
9.	"I Must Have Done Something Bad"	Red Lane	3:19
10.	"Hello Heart"	Melba Montgomery, Yates	2:45

== Personnel ==
- Harold Bradley – bass guitar, baritone guitar
- Jim Chapman – backing vocals
- Glen Duncan – fiddle
- Paul Franklin – Dobro, fiddle
- Gary Buho Gazaway – trumpet
- John Hughey – pedal steel guitar
- Roy Huskey Jr. – double bass
- George Jones – acoustic guitar, vocals
- Marabeth Jordan – backing vocals
- Jana King – backing vocals
- Millie Kirkham – backing vocals
- Mike Lawler – keyboards
- Paul Leim – drums
- Larry Marrs – backing vocals
- Terry McMillan – harmonica
- Farrell Morris – percussion
- Rodger Morris – keyboards
- Louis Dean Nunley – backing vocals
- Danny Parks – electric guitar
- Don Potter – acoustic guitar
- Julie Reeves – background vocals
- Hargus "Pig" Robbins – piano
- Pete Wade – electric guitar
- Bergen White – backing vocals
- Dennis Wilson – backing vocals
- Curtis Young – backing vocals
