= This Is Me (Randy Travis album) =

Studio album by Randy Travis
- Released: April 26, 1994
- Recorded: 1993
- Studios: Morningstar Sound Studio, Hendersonville, TN Imagine Sound and Nightingale Studio, Nashville, TN
- Genre: Country
- Length: 33:40
- Label: Warner Bros. Nashville
- Producer: Kyle Lehning

Randy Travis chronology
Wind in the Wire (1993)	This Is Me (1994)	Full Circle (1996)

Singles from This Is Me
- 1. "Before You Kill Us All" Released: February 28, 1994; 2. "Whisper My Name" Released: May 30, 1994; 3. "This Is Me" Released: October 10, 1994; 4. "The Box" Released: February 6, 1995

Professional ratings
Review scores
Source	Rating
AllMusic	4/5 stars
Chicago Tribune	2/4 stars
Robert Christgau	(1-star Honorable Mention)
Entertainment Weekly	A−
Q	4/5 stars
Rolling Stone	4/5 stars

This Is Me is the ninth studio album by American country music artist Randy Travis, released on April 26, 1994, by Warner Bros. Producer Kyle Lehning, Travis, and A&R Martha Sharp considered more than 1,000 songs before settling on the final ten. The tracks "Before You Kill Us All", "Whisper My Name", "This Is Me", and "The Box" were all released as singles, peaking at #2, #1, #5, and #8, respectively, on the Billboard country music charts. "Small Y'all" was later recorded by George Jones on his 1998 album It Don't Get Any Better Than This.

== Track listing ==
No.	Title	Writer(s)	Length
1.	"Honky Tonk Side of Town"	Jerry Phillips, Troy Seals, Eddie Setser	3:09
2.	"Before You Kill Us All"	Max T. Barnes, Keith Follesé	3:24
3.	"That's Where I Draw the Line"	Trey Bruce, Roger Brown	3:20
4.	"Whisper My Name"	Bruce	3:11
5.	"Small Y'all"	Bobby Braddock	2:55
6.	"Runaway Train"	Larry Gatlin, Jerry Steve Smith	3:22
7.	"This Is Me"	Tom Shapiro, Thom McHugh	3:26
8.	"The Box"	Randy Travis, Buck Moore	3:21
9.	"Gonna Walk That Line"	Jamie O'Hara, Kieran Kane	3:19
10.	"Oscar the Angel"	Don Schlitz	4:25

== Personnel ==
- Dennis Burnside - keyboards
- Larry Byrom - acoustic guitar, electric guitar, slide guitar
- Mark Casstevens - acoustic guitar
- Bruce Dees - background vocals
- Jerry Douglas - Dobro
- Paul Franklin - steel guitar
- Steve Gibson - electric guitar
- Doyle Grisham - steel guitar
- Jim Hoke - soprano saxophone, tenor saxophone
- Sherilyn Huffman - background vocals
- David Hungate - bass guitar
- Chris Leuzinger - acoustic guitar
- Paul Leim - drums
- Larrie Londin - drums
- Brent Mason - electric guitar
- Suzi Ragsdale - background vocals
- Tom Roady - percussion
- Hargus "Pig" Robbins - piano
- Kayton Robbins - steel guitar
- John Wesley Ryles - background vocals
- Darrell Scott - background vocals
- Lisa Silver - background vocals
- Hank Singer - fiddle
- Jay Spell - electric piano
- Harry Stinson - drums
- Verlon Thompson - background vocals
- Randy Travis - lead vocals
- Dianne Vanette - background vocals
- Cindy Richardson-Walker - background vocals
- Billy Joe Walker Jr. - electric guitar
- Biff Watson - acoustic guitar
- Dennis Wilson - background vocals
- Curtis Young - background vocals

== Chart performance ==
Chart (1994)	Peak position
U.S. Billboard Top Country Albums	10
U.S. Billboard 200	59
Canadian RPM Country Albums	5

== Certifications ==
Region	Certification	Certified units/sales
United States (RIAA)	Gold	500,000^{^}
^{^} Shipments figures based on certification alone.
