= I'd Surrender All =

Single by Randy Travis

from the album High Lonesome
- B-side: "I'm Gonna Have a Little Talk"
- Released: March 30, 1992
- Recorded: 1991
- Genre: Country
- Length: 3:36
- Label: Warner Bros. Nashville
- Songwriters: Randy Travis, Alan Jackson
- Producer: Kyle Lehning

Randy Travis singles chronology
"Better Class of Losers" (1991)	"I'd Surrender All" (1992)	"If I Didn't Have You" (1992)

"I'd Surrender All" is a song co-written and recorded by American country music singer Randy Travis. It was released in March 1992 as the fourth and final single from his album High Lonesome, it peaked at number 20 in the United States and number 13 Canada. The song was written by Travis and Alan Jackson.

== Chart performance ==
"I'd Surrender All" debuted on the U.S. Billboard Hot Country Singles & Tracks for the week of April 4, 1992.

Chart (1992)	Peak position
Canada Country Singles (RPM)	13
US Hot Country Songs (Billboard)	20
