= Where Forever Begins (Ken Mellons album) =

1995 album by Ken Mellons

Studio album by Ken Mellons
- Released: November 14, 1995
- Genre: Country
- Label: Epic
- Producer: Jerry Cupit

Ken Mellons chronology
Ken Mellons (1994)	Where Forever Begins (1995)	The Best of Ken Mellons (2001)

Singles from Where Forever Begins
- 1. "Rub-a-Dubbin'" Released: September 30, 1995

Professional ratings
Review scores
Source	Rating
Allmusic	link
Country Standard Time	Mixed link
Entertainment Weekly	B link

Where Forever Begins is the second studio album by American country music artist Ken Mellons. Released in 1995 on Epic Records, it contains the singles "Rub-a-Dubbin'" and "Stranger in Your Eyes". “Rub-a-Dubbin” peaked at #39 on the Billboard country charts in 1995. "Stranger in Your Eyes" peaked at #55 and was originally recorded by Joe Diffie on his 1990 album, A Thousand Winding Roads. "He Ain't Even Cold Yet" was later recorded by Gretchen Wilson on her 2005 album All Jacked Up.

== Track listing ==
No.	Title	Writer(s)	Length
1.	"Don't Make Me Have to Come in There"	Jerry Cupit	2:39
2.	"I Went Crazy for Awhile"	Keith Whitley	3:01
3.	"Rub-a-Dubbin'"	Becky Hobbs, Don Goodman, Stan Paul Davis	2:13
4.	"Where Forever Begins"	Ken Mellons, Carson Chamberlain, Jim McBride	4:16
5.	"He'll Never Be a Lawyer" (featuring George Jones and John Anderson)	J. Cupit, Tracy Lea Reynolds, Sharon Corbitt, Lee Thomas Miller, Ray Brasseur, Memarie Cupit	2:35
6.	"Stranger in Your Eyes"	Max D. Barnes, Larry Jenkins, Joe Chambers	2:46
7.	"Memory Remover"	Mellons, Dale Dodson, Jimmy Melton	3:15
8.	"He Ain't Even Cold Yet"	Cyril Rawson, Billy Lawson	4:21
9.	"Ever Ready"	Mellons, J. Cupit	2:35
10.	"With His Hands"	Mellons, J. Cupit, Reynolds, Miller	2:45

== Personnel ==
- Bobby All - acoustic guitar
- John Anderson - vocals on "He'll Never Be a Lawyer"
- Allen Frizzell - background vocals
- John Hobbs - piano
- Richard Hughes - jews harp
- John Hughey - steel guitar, dobro
- Carl Jackson - background vocals
- George Jones - vocals on "He'll Never Be a Lawyer"
- Joe Khoury - acoustic guitar
- Paul Leim- drums
- Ken Mellons - lead vocals
- Al Perkins - dobro
- Tom Robb - bass guitar
- Brent Rowan - electric guitar
- John Wesley Ryles - background vocals
- Hank Singer - fiddle, mandolin
- Milton Sledge - drums
- Billy Smith - background vocals
- Terry Smith - background vocals
- Jamie Whiting - piano
- Dennis Wilson - background vocals
- Reggie Young - electric guitar
