= Heroes & Friends =

Studio album by Randy Travis
- Released: August 31, 1990
- Recorded: 1989–90
- Genre: Country
- Length: 37:12
- Label: Warner
- Producer: Kyle Lehning

Randy Travis chronology
No Holdin' Back (1989)	Heroes & Friends (1990)	High Lonesome (1991)

Singles from Heroes & Friends
- 1. "A Few Ole Country Boys" Released: August 27, 1990; 2. "Heroes and Friends" Released: January 21, 1991; 3. "We're Strangers Again" Released: August 5, 1991

Professional ratings
Review scores
Source	Rating
AllMusic	3/5 stars
Chicago Tribune	3.5/4 stars
Robert Christgau	(neither)
Entertainment Weekly	D+
Los Angeles Times	2.5/5 stars
Q	3/5 stars

Heroes & Friends is the sixth studio album by American country music artist Randy Travis. It was released on August 31, 1990, by Warner Records. Except for the title track (which is reprised at the end), every song on this album is a duet with another recording artist. "A Few Ole Country Boys" (a duet with George Jones) and the title track were both released as singles from this album, peaking at numbers 8 and 3, respectively, on the Billboard Hot Country Singles & Tracks (now Hot Country Songs) charts in 1990.

"We're Strangers Again" was originally recorded by Merle Haggard and Leona Williams on their 1983 album Heart to Heart. The version here, a duet between Travis and Tammy Wynette, was later included on Wynette's Best Loved Hits album, from which it was released as a single in late 1991.

== Track listing ==
No.	Title	Writer(s)	Duet partner	Length
1.	"Heroes and Friends"	Randy Travis, Don Schlitz	n/a	2:09
2.	"Do I Ever Cross Your Mind"	Dolly Parton	Dolly Parton	2:46
3.	"The Birth of the Blues"	Lew Brown, Buddy DeSylva, Ray Henderson	Willie Nelson	2:38
4.	"All Night Long"	Johnny Gimble, Bob Wills	Merle Haggard	3:04
5.	"The Human Race"	Tim Mensy, Jimmy Phillips, Gene Dobbins	Vern Gosdin	2:27
6.	"Shopping for Dresses"	Merle Haggard, "Little" Jimmy Dickens	Loretta Lynn	3:00
7.	"Waiting on the Light to Change"	Gary Nicholson, Richard Leigh	B.B. King	2:44
8.	"A Few Ole Country Boys"	Troy Seals, Mentor Williams	George Jones	3:37
9.	"Walk Our Own Road"	Bernie Nelson, Lisa Palas	Kris Kristofferson	2:44
10.	"We're Strangers Again"	Haggard, Leona Williams	Tammy Wynette	2:45
11.	"Smokin' the Hive"	Byron Hill, J. Remington Wilde	Clint Eastwood	2:23
12.	"Come See About Me"	Conway Twitty	Conway Twitty	2:46
13.	"Happy Trails"	Dale Evans	Roy Rogers	2:13
14.	"Heroes and Friends (Reprise)"	Travis, Schlitz	n/a	1:56

== Personnel ==
- Chet Atkins – gut string guitar, background vocals
- Kathie Baillie – choir
- Eddie Bayers – drums
- Barry Beckett – piano
- Michael Bonagura Jr. – choir
- Dennis Burnside – piano, electric piano, Wurlitzer
- Larry Byrom – acoustic guitar
- Gary Carter – steel guitar
- Mark Casstevens – acoustic guitar
- Jerry Douglas – Dobro
- Clint Eastwood – duet vocals on "Smokin' the Hive"
- Steve Gibson – 12-string guitar, electric guitar, mandolin
- Bob Glaub – bass guitar
- Randy Goodrum – piano
- Vern Gosdin – duet vocals on "The Human Race"
- Doyle Grisham – steel guitar
- Merle Haggard – duet vocals on "All Night Long"
- Lib Hatcher – choir
- Sherilyn Huffman – choir, background vocals
- David Hungate – bass guitar
- David Johnson – fiddle
- Kirk "Jelly Roll" Johnson – harmonica
- George Jones – duet vocals on "A Few Ole Country Boys"
- Nancy Jones – background vocals on "A Few Ole Country Boys"
- Shane Keister – organ, piano
- B. B. King – duet vocals and electric guitar on "Waiting On The Light to Change"
- Kris Kristofferson – duet vocals on "Walk Our Own Road"
- Mike Lawler – banjo, synthesizer
- Kyle Lehning – Wurlitzer
- Chris Leuzinger – acoustic guitar
- Paul Leim – drums
- Larrie Londin – drums
- Loretta Lynn – duet vocals on "Shopping for Dresses"
- Terry McMillan – harmonica, percussion
- JayDee Maness – steel guitar
- Brent Mason – electric guitar
- Willie Nelson – duet vocals on "The Birth of the Blues"
- Mark O'Connor – fiddle
- Dean Parks – electric guitar
- Dolly Parton – duet vocals on "Do I Ever Cross Your Mind"
- Mickey Raphael – harmonica
- Hargus "Pig" Robbins – piano
- Roy Rogers – duet vocals on "Happy Trails"
- Brent Rowan – electric guitar
- Tom Rutledge – fiddle, acoustic guitar
- Don Schlitz – choir
- Troy Seals – choir
- Allen Shamblin – choir
- Martha Sharp – choir
- Lisa Silver – choir, background vocals
- Denis Solee – clarinet
- Keith Stegall – choir
- Fred Tackett – acoustic guitar
- Randy Travis – lead vocals
- Conway Twitty – duet vocals on "Come See About Me"
- Diane Vanette – choir, background vocals
- Carlos Vega – drums
- Jack Williams – bass guitar
- Dennis Wilson – background vocals
- Tammy Wynette – duet vocals on "We're Strangers Again"

== Charts ==
=== Weekly charts ===
Chart (1990)	Peak position
Canadian Albums (RPM)	61
US Billboard 200	31
US Top Country Albums (Billboard)	1

=== Year-end charts ===
Chart (1990)	Position
US Top Country Albums (Billboard)	69
Chart (1991)	Position
US Top Country Albums (Billboard)	11

== Certifications ==
Region	Certification	Certified units/sales
Canada (Music Canada)	Platinum	100,000^{^}
United States (RIAA)	Platinum	1,000,000^{^}
^{^} Shipments figures based on certification alone.
