= Songs of the Season =

Studio album by Randy Travis
- Released: September 25, 2007
- Genre: Christmas music, Country
- Length: 43:12
- Label: Word
- Producer: Kyle Lehning

Randy Travis chronology
Glory Train: Songs of Faith, Worship, and Praise (2005)	Songs of the Season (2007)	Around the Bend (2008)

Songs of the Season is the eighteenth studio album and the second Christmas album by American country music artist Randy Travis. It was released by Word Records on September 25, 2007. The album peaked at number 26 on the Billboard Top Country Albums chart. The album has sold 191,600 copies in the United States as of November 2017.

== Track listing ==
No.	Title	Writer(s)	Length
1.	"(There's No Place Like) Home for the Holidays"	Robert Allen and Al Stillman	2:52
2.	"Have Yourself a Merry Little Christmas"	Ralph Blane and Hugh Martin	3:34
3.	"O Holy Night"	Adolphe Adam and John Sullivan Dwight	3:42
4.	"Go Tell It on the Mountain"	Traditional/John Wesley Work Jr.	3:35
5.	"Labor of Love"	Andrew Peterson	4:41
6.	"Angels We Have Heard on High"	public domain	3:25
7.	"Let It Snow! Let It Snow! Let It Snow!"	Sammy Cahn and Jule Styne	2:21
8.	"Away in a Manger"	William J. Kirkpatrick	2:48
9.	"O Little Town of Bethlehem"	public domain	3:17
10.	"Nothin's Gonna Bring Me Down (At Christmas Time)"	Pat Alger	3:11
11.	"The First Noel"	public domain	3:37
12.	"Joy to the World"	George Frideric Handel, Isaac Watts	2:48
13.	"Our King"	Randy Travis	3:21

== Personnel ==
- Pat Bergeson - acoustic guitar, electric guitar, harmonica
- Dan Dugmore - dobro, acoustic guitar, pedal steel guitar
- Larry Franklin - fiddle, mandolin
- Steve Gibson - acoustic guitar
- Carl Gorodetzky - string contractor
- Tony Harrell - Fender Rhodes, harmonium, Hammond organ
- Wes Hightower - background vocals
- Sherilynn Huffman - background vocals
- David Hungate - bass guitar
- Shane Keister - Hammond organ, piano, electric piano
- Keith Nicholas - cello
- Paul Leim - drums
- Ann McCrary - background vocals
- Regina McCrary - background vocals
- Brent Mason - electric guitar
- The Nashville String Machine - strings
- Lisa Silver - background vocals
- Randy Travis - lead vocals
- Diane Vanette - background vocals
- Bergen White - string arrangements, conductor
- Casey Wood - bells, cymbals, Fender Rhodes, electric piano, shaker, sleigh bells, tambourine, triangle, vibraphone

== Chart performance ==
Chart (2007)	Peak position
US Billboard Top Christian Albums	9
US Billboard Top Country Albums	26
US Billboard 200	131
US Billboard Top Holiday Albums	9
