= Point of Light =

Single by Randy Travis

from the album High Lonesome
- B-side: "Waiting on the Light to Change"
- Released: May 9, 1991
- Recorded: The Nightingale, Nashville, 1990
- Genre: Country
- Length: 3:34
- Label: Warner Bros. Nashville 19283
- Songwriters: Don Schlitz & Thom Schuyler
- Producer: Kyle Lehning

Randy Travis singles chronology
"Heroes and Friends" (1991)	"Point of Light" (1991)	"Forever Together" (1991)

"Point of Light" is a song written by Don Schlitz and Thom Schuyler, and recorded by American country music artist Randy Travis. It was released in May 1991 as the lead-off single from his album High Lonesome. It was his twenty-first single overall. It charted at #3 on the Billboard Hot Country Singles & Tracks and hit #1 on the Canadian RPM country Tracks chart.

== Content ==
This song has a moral message to do the right thing and become a "point of light". The song goes on to praise social workers and teachers as points of light. Don Schlitz and Thom Schuyler were commissioned to write the song in response to then-United States President George H. W. Bush's "Thousand points of light" program.

== Musicians ==
As listed in liner notes.

- Dennis Burnside - piano
- Larry Byrom - acoustic guitar
- Mark Casstevens - acoustic guitar
- Steve Gibson - electric guitar
- Doyle Grisham - steel guitar
- David Hungate - bass guitar
- Larrie Londin - drums
- Terry McMillan - percussion, harmonica
- Mark O'Connor - fiddle
- Randy Travis - lead vocals
- John Willis - electric guitar

== Background vocals ==
- Carol Chase
- Cindy Richardson-Walker
- John Wesley Ryles
- Lisa Silver
- Dennis Wilson
- Curtis Young

== Chart performance ==
"Point of Light" spent two weeks at number 1 on the Canadian RPM Country Tracks chart.

Chart (1991)	Peak position
Canada Country Singles (RPM)	1
US Hot Country Songs (Billboard)	3

=== Year-end charts ===
Chart (1991)	Position
Canada Country Tracks (RPM)	3
US Country Songs (Billboard)	31
