= Always & Forever (Randy Travis album) =

Studio album by Randy Travis
- Released: May 4, 1987
- Recorded: 1986
- Venues: StarGem and Audio Media – Nashville, TN
- Genres: Neotraditional country; honky-tonk
- Length: 30:31
- Label: Warner Bros. Nashville
- Producer: Kyle Lehning

Randy Travis chronology
Storms of Life (1986)	Always & Forever (1987)	Old 8×10 (1988)

Singles from Always & Forever
- 1. "Forever and Ever, Amen" Released: March 1987; 2. "I Won't Need You Anymore (Always and Forever)" Released: August 10, 1987; 3. "Too Gone Too Long" Released: December 7, 1987; 4. "I Told You So" Released: March 21, 1988

Professional ratings
Review scores
Source	Rating
AllMusic	5/5 stars
Robert Christgau	B
Los Angeles Times	1/4 stars

Always & Forever is the second studio album by American country music singer Randy Travis. It was released on May 4, 1987, by Warner Bros. Records. Released from this album were the singles "Too Gone Too Long", "I Won't Need You Anymore (Always and Forever)", "Forever and Ever, Amen" and "I Told You So", all of which reached Number One on the Billboard Hot Country Songs charts.

The track "What'll You Do About Me" has been covered by several artists, including single releases by Steve Earle, the Forester Sisters and Doug Supernaw. "I Told You So" was covered by Carrie Underwood as a duet with Travis on her 2007 album Carnival Ride, from which it was released as a single in January 2009.

== Track listing ==
No.	Title	Writer(s)	Length
1.	"Too Gone Too Long"	Gene Pistilli	2:26
2.	"My House"	Al Gore; Paul Overstreet	2:54
3.	"Good Intentions"	Marvin Coe; Merle Haggard; Randy Travis	3:37
4.	"What'll You Do About Me"	Dennis Linde	2:38
5.	"I Won't Need You Anymore (Always and Forever)"	Max D. Barnes; Troy Seals	3:12
6.	"Forever and Ever, Amen"	Overstreet; Don Schlitz	3:31
7.	"I Told You So"	Travis	3:40
8.	"Anything"	Ronny Scaife; Phil Thomas	2:41
9.	"The Truth Is Lyin' Next to You"	Ronny Scaife; Susan Longacre; Kent Robbins	3:24
10.	"Tonight We're Gonna Tear Down the Walls"	Jim Sales; Travis	2:38

== Production ==
- Engineer Outboard Gear Service: Studio Equipment Rental (co-owner: Pamela M Jones)

== Personnel ==
- Baillie & The Boys – background vocals
- Russ Barenberg – acoustic guitar
- Michael Brooks – background vocals
- Dennis Burnside – keyboards
- Larry Byrom – acoustic guitar
- Mark Casstevens – acoustic guitar
- Jerry Douglas – dobro
- Paul Franklin – pedabro
- Steve Gibson – acoustic guitar, electric guitar
- Doyle Grisham – steel guitar
- Sherilyn Huffman – background vocals
- David Hungate – bass guitar
- Kirk "Jelly Roll" Johnson – harmonica
- Dennis Locorriere – background vocals
- Larrie Londin – drums
- Terry McMillan – percussion, harmonica
- Brent Mason – acoustic guitar, electric guitar
- Mark O'Connor – fiddle
- Paul Overstreet – background vocals
- Lisa Silver – background vocals
- James Stroud – drums
- Diane Tidwell – background vocals
- Randy Travis – acoustic guitar, lead vocals
- Jack Williams – bass guitar
- Dennis Wilson – background vocals
- Photography – Empire Studio (Scott Bonner/Ron Keith)

== Charts ==
=== Weekly charts ===
Chart (1987–88)	Peak position
Australia (Kent Music Report)	97
Canadian Albums (RPM)	16
US Billboard 200	19
US Top Country Albums (Billboard)	1

=== Year-end charts ===
Chart (1987)	Position
US Billboard 200	74
US Top Country Albums (Billboard)	7
Chart (1988)	Position
US Billboard 200	46
US Top Country Albums (Billboard)	1
Chart (1989)	Position
US Top Country Albums (Billboard)	9
Chart (1990)	Position
US Top Country Albums (Billboard)	15

== Certifications ==
Region	Certification	Certified units/sales
Canada (Music Canada)	5× Platinum	500,000^{^}
United States (RIAA)	5× Platinum	5,000,000^{^}
^{^} Shipments figures based on certification alone.
