= Around the Bend (album) =

Studio album by Randy Travis
- Released: July 15, 2008
- Genre: Country
- Length: 42:20
- Label: Warner Bros. Nashville
- Producer: Kyle Lehning

Randy Travis chronology
Songs of the Season (2007)	Around the Bend (2008)	I Told You So: The Ultimate Hits of Randy Travis (2009)

Singles from Around the Bend
- 1. "Faith in You" Released: March 10, 2008; 2. "Dig Two Graves" Released: June 23, 2008

Professional ratings
Aggregate scores
Source	Rating
Metacritic	(72/100)
Review scores
Source	Rating
About.com	4/5 stars
Allmusic	3/5 stars
Billboard	(favorable)
The Boston Globe	(favorable)
Los Angeles Times	3/4 stars
The New York Times	(positive)
PopMatters	7/10 stars
Robert Christgau	(3-star Honorable Mention)
Slant Magazine	3/5 stars
Engine 145	4/5 stars

Around the Bend is the nineteenth studio album released in 2008 by American country music artist Randy Travis. The album is Travis' first mainstream country music album since 1999's A Man Ain't Made of Stone as all his other studio albums in the 2000s were composed of Christian country music. It sold 31,000 copies in its first week of release, the best opening week of Travis' career. Three singles were released from the album: "Faith in You", "Dig Two Graves" and "Turn It Around", none of which charted.

Around the Bend was nominated for best country album at the 51st Grammy Awards, and the track "Dig Two Graves" was nominated as best country song.

== Track listing ==
No.	Title	Writer(s)	Length
1.	"Around the Bend"	Tania Hancheroff; Marcus Hummon; Tia Sillers	3:36
2.	"You Didn't have a Good Time"	Kris Bergsnes; Jason Matthews; Jim McCormick	3:56
3.	"Every Head Bowed"	Brent Baxter; Brandon Kinney	3:26
4.	"Love Is a Gamble"	Hugh Prestwood	4:50
5.	"Faith in You"	Tom Douglas; Joe Henry; Matt Rollings	3:45
6.	"Don't Think Twice, It's All Right"	Bob Dylan	4:16
7.	"Dig Two Graves"	Ashley Gorley; Bob Regan	3:16
8.	"Turn It Around"	Noah Gordon; Matt Kennon	2:58
9.	"From Your Knees"	Leslie Satcher	4:00
10.	"Everything That I Own (Has Got a Dent)"	Tony Martin; Mark Nesler	3:30
11.	"'Til I'm Dead and Gone"	Shawn Camp; John Scott Sherrill; Sarah Siskind	4:38

iTunes bonus tracks
No.	Title	Length
12.	"One in a Row" (Pre-order exclusive)	3:25
13.	"Lead Me Home" (Pre-order exclusive)	3:34
14.	"Faith in You" (Theater Performance) (Video)	3:46

== Personnel ==
- Dan Dugmore - pedal steel guitar
- Larry Franklin - fiddle
- Paul Franklin - fiddle, pedal steel guitar
- Carl Gorodetzky - string contractor
- Tania Hancheroff - background vocals
- Aubrey Haynie - fiddle, mandolin
- Wes Hightower - background vocals
- Sherilynn Huffman - background vocals
- David Hungate - bass guitar
- Rob Ickes - dobro
- Paul Leim - drums
- Brent Mason - 12-string electric guitar, electric guitar
- Gordon Mote - Hammond organ, piano, Wurlitzer
- The Nashville String Machine - strings
- Steve Nathan - Hammond organ, piano, Wurlitzer
- Dan Seals - background vocals
- Lisa Silver - background vocals
- Bryan Sutton - banjo, acoustic guitar, hi-string guitar, mandolin
- Randy Travis - lead vocals
- Dianne Vanette - background vocals
- Bergen White - conductor, string arrangements
- Casey Wood - cymbals, shaker, tambourine

== Charts ==
=== Weekly charts ===
Chart (2008)	Peak position
US Billboard 200	14
US Top Country Albums (Billboard)	3

=== Year-end charts ===
Chart (2008)	Position
US Top Country Albums (Billboard)	73

== Awards ==
The album won a Dove Award for Country Album of the Year at the 40th GMA Dove Awards.
