= Wind in the Wire =

Studio album by Randy Travis
- Released: August 17, 1993
- Genre: Country
- Length: 28:46
- Label: Warner
- Producer: Steve Gibson

Randy Travis chronology
Greatest Hits, Volume 2 (1992)	Wind in the Wire (1993)	This Is Me (1994)

Singles from Wind in the Wire
- 1. "Cowboy Boogie" Released: August 16, 1993; 2. "Wind in the Wire" Released: December 6, 1993

Professional ratings
Review scores
Source	Rating
AllMusic	2/5 stars
Robert Christgau	(neither)
Entertainment Weekly	C
Los Angeles Times	2/4 stars

Wind in the Wire is the eighth studio album released by American country music artist Randy Travis. It was released on August 17, 1993, by Warner Records. The album was made to accompany a television series also entitled Wind in the Wire. Two of the album's singles — "Cowboy Boogie" and the title track — entered the Billboard country music charts, peaking at #46 and #65, respectively, making this the first album of Travis's career not to produce any Top 40 hits in the United States. "Cowboy Boogie", however, was a #10 on the RPM Country Tracks charts in Canada.

In addition, this album is also one of three albums not to be produced by Travis' longtime record producer, Kyle Lehning.

== Track listing ==
1. "Down at the Old Corral" (Roger Brown, Luke Reed) – 3:17
2. "Cowboy Boogie" (Robert Blythe) – 2:48
3. "Blue Mesa" (Brown, Reed) – 2:59
4. "Memories of Old Santa Fe" (Brown, Rick Peoples) – 3:18
5. "Roamin' Wyomin'" (Brown, Reed) – 2:30
6. "Wind in the Wire" (David Wilkie, Stewart MacDougall) – 3:29
7. "The Old Chisholm Trail" (Traditional) – 3:06
8. "Paniolo Country" (Marcus Shutte, Jr.) – 2:37
9. "Hula Hands" (William D. Beasley, J.T. Adams, Jean Norris) – 2:12
10. "Beyond the Reef" (Jack Pitman) – 2:30

== Personnel ==
- Eddie Bayers – drums
- Bruce Bouton – dobro, pedal steel guitar
- Mark Casstevens – acoustic guitar
- Glen Duncan – fiddle
- Sonny Garrish – pedabro, pedal steel guitar
- Steve Gibson – dobro, acoustic guitar, electric guitar, mandolin
- Rob Hajacos – fiddle
- David Hungate – bass guitar
- John Barlow Jarvis – keyboards
- Kapena – background vocals
- Charlie McCoy – harmonica
- Craig Nelson – bass guitar
- Cyril Pahinui – slack key guitar
- James Bla Pahinui – ukulele
- Martin Pahinui – bass guitar
- Gary Prim – keyboards
- Randy Scruggs – acoustic guitar
- Karen Taylor-Good – background vocals
- Randy Travis – acoustic guitar, lead vocals
- Dick Tunney – accordion
- Billy Joe Walker Jr. – acoustic guitar, electric guitar
- Bergen White – background vocals
- Willie K. – background vocals
- Dennis Wilson – background vocals
- Lonnie Wilson – drums
- Curtis Young – background vocals

== Chart performance ==
Chart (1993)	Peak position
U.S. Billboard Top Country Albums	24
U.S. Billboard 200	121
Canadian RPM Country Albums	5
