= Jukebox Junkie =

Single by Ken Mellons

from the album Ken Mellons
- B-side: "The Pleasure's All Mine"
- Released: July 18, 1994
- Genre: Country
- Length: 2:41
- Label: Epic
- Songwriters: Ken Mellons; Jerry Cupit; Janice Honeycutt
- Producer: Jerry Cupit

Ken Mellons singles chronology
| "Lookin' in the Same Direction" (1994) | "Jukebox Junkie" (1994) | "I Can Bring Her Back" (1994) |

"Jukebox Junkie" is a song co-written and recorded by American country music artist Ken Mellons. It was released in July 1994 as the second single from his debut album Ken Mellons. The song reached number 8 on the Billboard Hot Country Singles & Tracks chart and peaked at number 6 on the Canadian RPM Country Tracks chart. It was written by Mellons, Jerry Cupit and Janice Honeycutt.

== Content ==
The song is an uptempo, in which the narrator talks about how he loves to listen to the jukebox.

== Critical reception ==
Deborah Evans Price, of Billboard magazine gave the song a mixed review, saying that while Mellons "possesses one of those deep, whiskey-soaked voice that could never be mistaken for anything but country", the song will likely "never be mistaken for anything other than what it is - a hopeless string of honky-tonk cliches."

== Music video ==
The music video was directed by Marc Ball and premiered in mid-1994.

== Chart performance ==
"Jukebox Junkie" debuted at number sixty nine on the U.S. Billboard Hot Country Singles & Tracks for the week of July 30, 1994.

| Chart (1994) | Peak position |
|---|---|
| Canada Country Singles (RPM) | 6 |
| US Hot Country Songs (Billboard) | 8 |

=== Year-end charts ===
| Chart (1994) | Position |
|---|---|
| Canada Country Tracks (RPM) | 57 |
