= Forever Together =

Single by Randy Travis

from the album High Lonesome
- B-side: "This Day Was Made For Me And You"
- Released: September 23, 1991
- Genre: Country
- Length: 3:06
- Label: Warner Bros. Nashville 19158
- Songwriters: Randy Travis & Alan Jackson
- Producer: Kyle Lehning

Randy Travis singles chronology
| "Point of Light" (1991) | "Forever Together" (1991) | "Better Class of Losers" (1991) |

"Forever Together" is a song co-written and recorded by American country music artist Randy Travis. It was released in September 1991 as the second single from his album High Lonesome. It peaked at number 1 on both the Billboard Hot Country Singles & Tracks and the Canadian RPM country Tracks chart. It was co-written by Travis with fellow musician, Alan Jackson while they were on tour together.

== Content ==
A non-album track, "This Day Was Made for You and Me", co-written by Travis and John Lindley, was a B-side on the 7" single. The song was previously released as the B-side of Travis' 1989 single "It's Just a Matter of Time".

== Musicians ==
As listed in liner notes.

- Eddie Bayers - drums
- Dennis Burnside - piano
- Steve Gibson - electric guitar
- Doyle Grisham - steel guitar
- Sherilyn Huffman - background vocals
- David Hungate - bass guitar
- Kyle Lehning - Wurlitzer
- Mac McAnally - acoustic guitar
- Brent Mason - electric guitar
- Mark O'Connor - fiddle
- Lisa Silver - background vocals
- Randy Travis - lead vocals
- Diane Vanette - background vocals
- Curtis Young - background vocals

== Chart performance ==
"Forever Together" debuted at number 47 on the U.S. Billboard Hot Country Singles & Tracks for the week of September 28, 1991.

| Chart (1991) | Peak position |
|---|---|
| Canada Country Singles (RPM) | 1 |
| US Hot Country Songs (Billboard) | 1 |

=== Year-end charts ===
| Chart (1991) | Position |
|---|---|
| Canada Country Tracks (RPM) | 52 |
