= The Box (Randy Travis song) =

Single by Randy Travis

from the album This Is Me
- B-side: "Honky Tonk Side of Town"
- Released: February 6, 1995
- Genre: Country
- Length: 3:21
- Label: Warner Bros. Nashville 17970
- Songwriters: Randy Travis; Buck Moore
- Producer: Kyle Lehning

Randy Travis singles chronology
"This Is Me" (1994)	"The Box" (1995)	"Are We in Trouble Now" (1996)

"The Box" is a song co-written and recorded by American country music artist Randy Travis. It was released in February 1995 as the fourth and final single from his album This Is Me. The song reached number 7 on the Billboard Hot Country Singles & Tracks chart in April 1995. Before its release, it was the b-side to the album's first single, "Before You Kill Us All". Travis wrote this song with Buck Moore.

== Content ==
The song is a story of a son who finds a box his father kept full of memories of his family. As the son goes through the box, he is reminded that his father loved his family but it wasn't easy for him to say "I love you".

== Critical reception ==
Deborah Evans Price of Billboard magazine reviewed the song favorably, saying that fiddles and picked acoustic guitars "dominate this track" and that Travis' voice is "unmistakable." She goes on to call the song "simply told and beautifully sung."

== Music video ==
The music video was directed by Jim Shea and premiered in early 1995.

== Chart performance ==
"The Box" debuted at number 59 on the U.S. Billboard Hot Country Singles & Tracks for the week of February 11, 1995.

Chart (1995)	Peak position
Canada Country Singles (RPM)	2
US Hot Country Songs (Billboard)	7

=== Year-end charts ===
Chart (1995)	Position
Canada Country Tracks (RPM)	34
