= A Few Ole Country Boys =

1990 single by Randy Travis

Single by Randy Travis featuring George Jones

from the album Heroes & Friends
- B-side: "Smokin' the Hive" (w/ Clint Eastwood)
- Released: November 21, 1990
- Genre: Country
- Length: 3:37
- Label: Warner Bros. Nashville 19586
- Songwriters: Troy Seals; Mentor Williams
- Producer: Kyle Lehning

Randy Travis singles chronology
| "He Walked on Water" (1990) | "A Few Ole Country Boys" (1990) | "Heroes and Friends" (1991) |

George Jones singles chronology
| "Radio Lover" (1989) | "A Few Ole Country Boys" (1990) | "All Fall Down" (1991) |

"A Few Ole Country Boys" is a song written by Troy Seals and Mentor Williams, and recorded as a duet by American country music artists Randy Travis and George Jones. It was released in November 1990 as the first single from each singer's albums of duets, Heroes & Friends and Friends in High Places respectively. "A Few Ole Country Boys" peaked at number 8 on the Billboard Hot Country Singles & Tracks chart and reached number 4 on the Canadian RPM country Tracks chart.

== Background ==
By 1990, Randy Travis was country music's hottest star and the face of the "new traditionalist" movement, a movement that sought to bring back the honky-tonk sound and classic vocals to country music that George Jones had done so much to pioneer. Artists like Travis, Dwight Yoakam, and Ricky Van Shelton were indirectly responsible for nudging older country artists off the charts during this time as country radio became obsessed with tapping into a younger market. The single was significant because it made Jones the only country artist in history to have a Top 10 song in five consecutive decades. Travis has cited Jones as a primary influence and the song reflects this, alluding to the younger singer's troubled past (Travis had been a juvenile delinquent) and how he drew inspiration from Jones. George was equally complimentary in his 1995 memoir I Lived to Tell It All, singling out Travis for praise while lamenting how country radio had turned its back on older country artists: "If Randy Travis had come to town last month, he probably wouldn't have gotten a record deal. He's too good and too original...And he doesn't wear a cowboy hat or pimple cream. Today's labels are looking for pretty boys and girls." At the end of the song, Travis parodies Jones' idiosyncratic phrasing.

== Chart performance ==
| Chart (1990) | Peak position |
|---|---|
| Canada Country Singles (RPM) | 4 |
| US Hot Country Songs (Billboard) | 8 |

=== Year-end charts ===
| Chart (1990) | Position |
|---|---|
| Canada Country Tracks (RPM) | 63 |
