= Look Heart, No Hands =

Single by Randy Travis

from the album Greatest Hits, Volume Two
- B-side: "The Heart to Climb the Mountain"
- Released: November 16, 1992
- Genre: Country
- Length: 3:10
- Label: Warner Bros. Nashville
- Songwriters: Trey Bruce; Russell Smith
- Producer: Kyle Lehning

Randy Travis singles chronology
"If I Didn't Have You" (1992)	"Look Heart, No Hands" (1992)	"An Old Pair of Shoes" (1993)

"Look Heart, No Hands" is a song written by Trey Bruce and former Amazing Rhythm Aces member Russell Smith, and recorded by American country music artist Randy Travis. It was released in November 1992 as the only new single for his Greatest Hits, Volume Two compilation. Travis' rendition of the song was a Number One hit for him in early 1993, spending two weeks at the top of the Billboard country singles charts.

== Content ==
"Look Heart, No Hands" is a mid-tempo in which the narrator expresses the feeling of falling in love, comparing it to riding a bicycle downhill without holding onto the handlebars.

== Music video ==
The music video was directed by Jim Shea and premiered in late 1992.

== Chart performance ==
"Look Heart, No Hands" debuted at number 56 on the U.S. Billboard Hot Country Singles & Tracks for the week of November 21, 1992.

Chart (1992–1993)	Peak position
Canada Country Singles (RPM)	1
US Hot Country Songs (Billboard)	1

=== Year-end charts ===
Chart (1993)	Position
Canada Country Tracks (RPM)	11
US Country Songs (Billboard)	32
