= Deeper Than the Holler =

Single by Randy Travis

from the album Old 8x10
- B-side: "It's Out of My Hands"
- Released: November 14, 1988
- Genre: Country
- Length: 3:39
- Label: Warner Bros. Nashville 27689
- Songwriter(s): Paul Overstreet, Don Schlitz
- Producer(s): Kyle Lehning

Randy Travis singles chronology
"Honky Tonk Moon" (1988)	"Deeper Than the Holler" (1988)	"Is It Still Over?" (1989)

"Deeper Than the Holler" is a song written by Paul Overstreet and Don Schlitz, and recorded by American country music singer Randy Travis. It was released in November 1988 as the second single from the album, Old 8x10. The song was his eighth Number One single, and his sixth consecutive.

== Content ==
"Deeper Than the Holler" is a mid-tempo ballad in which the narrator describes his love for his woman. He starts by saying that he's heard many people sing about how they love their loved ones, and using metaphors to describe it. The man then decides to sing his song about how he feels about his lover.

In the second verse, the narrator sings on how there are "at least a million love songs that people love to sing" about their true love.

== German Release ==
A 3" CD single was released in Germany (cat. #W7804CD9210082) featuring the same cover as "I Told You So". The songs "I Told You So", "1982" and "No Place Like Home" were included.

== Chart performance ==
The song debuted at number 42 on the Hot Country Songs chart dated November 19, 1988, and rocketed its way into the Top 30 the next week, moving up from number 42 to number 28. It charted for 18 weeks on that chart, and became Travis' eighth Number One single on the country chart dated January 28, 1989. In addition, it was his sixth consecutive Number One.

Chart (1988–1989)	Peak position
US Hot Country Songs (Billboard)	1
Canadian RPM Country Tracks	1

=== Year-end charts ===
Chart (1989)	Position
Canada Country Tracks (RPM)	51
US Country Songs (Billboard)	54

== Certifications ==
Region	Certification	Certified units/sales
United States (RIAA)	Platinum	1,000,000^{‡}
^{‡} Sales+streaming figures based on certification alone.
