= Better Class of Losers =

Single by Randy Travis

from the album High Lonesome
- B-side: "I'm Gonna Have a Little Talk"
- Released: December 9, 1991
- Recorded: 1991
- Genre: Country
- Length: 2:41
- Label: Warner Bros. Nashville 19069
- Songwriters: Randy Travis, Alan Jackson
- Producer: Kyle Lehning

Randy Travis singles chronology
"Forever Together" (1991)	"Better Class of Losers" (1991)	"I'd Surrender All" (1992)

"Better Class of Losers" is a song recorded by American country music singer Randy Travis and co-written with Alan Jackson. It was released in December 1991 as the third single from his album High Lonesome. It peaked at number 2 in both the United States and Canada. Travis' performance earned him the Grammy nomination for Best Male Country Vocal Performance, his fifth nomination in that category.

== Content ==
The song is narrated from the point of view of a husband, who married a woman from "high society." Over the course of their relationship, he has grown to dislike both her friends and the high-class lifestyle she leads and has announced his intent to end the relationship. Instead, he intends to associate with people who live a much simpler lifestyle, such as those who "buy their coffee beans already ground" and who don't "pay their bills on home computers.”

== Music video ==
The music video was directed by Jim Shea, and features Travis walking through various sets that convey the song's description, such as a high-rise penthouse set to a farm style set.

== Musicians ==
As listed in liner notes.

- Eddie Bayers - drums
- Russ Barenberg - acoustic guitar
- Dennis Burnside - piano
- Jerry Douglas - dobro
- Doyle Grisham - steel guitar
- David Hungate - bass guitar
- Mac McAnally - acoustic guitar
- Brent Mason - 6 string bass, electric guitar
- Mark O'Connor - fiddle
- John Wesley Ryles - background vocals
- Randy Travis - lead vocals
- Dennis Wilson - background vocals
- Curtis Young - background vocals

== Use in media ==
This song was performed by Travis in the 2007 movie National Treasure: Book of Secrets, where he guest starred performing for the President of the United States at Mount Vernon.

It was also performed, in part, by Travis on a 1993 episode (The Mark) of "Matlock". Travis plays character Billy Wheeler, a country singer hired by Matlock (Andy Griffith) to paint his house, and later accused of killing a con artist.

== Chart performance ==
Chart (1991–1992)	Peak position
Canada Country Singles (RPM)	2
US Hot Country Songs (Billboard)	2

=== Year-end charts ===
Chart (1992)	Position
Canada Country Tracks (RPM)	27
US Country Songs (Billboard)	13
