= On the Other Hand =

1985 song by Randy Travis

Single by Randy Travis

from the album Storms of Life
- B-side: "Can't Stop Now" (1985) "1982" (1986)
- Released: July 29, 1985 (original release); April 21, 1986 (reissue)
- Recorded: January 30, 1985
- Genre: Neotraditional country
- Length: 3:06
- Label: Warner Bros. Nashville
- Songwriters: Paul Overstreet, Don Schlitz
- Producers: Kyle Lehning, Keith Stegall

Randy Travis singles chronology
"She's My Woman" (1978)	"On the Other Hand" (1985)	"1982" (1985)

Randy Travis (1985-86) singles chronology
"1982" (1985)	"On the Other Hand" (1986)	"Diggin' Up Bones" (1986)

"On the Other Hand" is a song written by Paul Overstreet and Don Schlitz, and recorded by American country music artist Randy Travis. It was first released as a single in July 1985, peaking at number 67 in the United States. It was Travis' first single with Warner Bros. Nashville and was only a minor hit. After the chart successes of Travis' next single, "1982", the label reissued "On the Other Hand" in April 1986, and it became his first number one hit in both the United States and Canada. "On the Other Hand" and "1982" were both included on Travis' 1986 debut album, Storms of Life.

== History ==
Writer Paul Overstreet came up with the idea for the song during a session with Don Schlitz. The two were having difficulty with a song they were working on titled "Greedy Heart" when Schlitz presented a list of ideas to Overstreet. One of the ideas on the list was the phrase "on the other hand", to which Overstreet immediately added "there's a golden band." The two writers finished the song and sent a demo to Pat Higdon, a song promoter who recommended it to producer Kyle Lehning with the intention of having Dan Seals recorded it. Lehning did not think the song was suitable for Seals and instead offered it to Randy Travis, who had just signed his first contract with Warner Records Nashville in early 1985.

Travis recorded the song with Lehning and Keith Stegall co-producing, as part of a four-song session which comprised his initial Warner contract. The other songs in this session were "Carrying Fire", "Reasons I Cheat", and "Prairie Rose". He performed the song live for the first time on the August 6, 1985, episode of the talk show Nashville Now. Keith Whitley also cut the song on his 1985 album L.A. to Miami.

== Composition ==
"On the Other Hand" is a neotraditional country song composed in the key of F major with an "easy country swing" tempo. The verses follow the chord pattern F-F7-B♭F-C-F-F7-B♭-G-C, with a pattern of B♭-F-C7-F twice on the chorus. Lyrically, it is about a man who is tempted to commit infidelity, but ultimately declines upon looking at his wedding ring.

== Chart positions ==
When first released, "On the Other Hand" spent twelve weeks on the Billboard Hot Country Songs charts, peaking at number 67. After its release, the label issued "1982" as a follow-up, which peaked at number six. Despite its initial failure at radio, Warner executives thought that "On the Other Hand" was suitable for a re-release. Executive Nick Hunter, who at the time promoted singles to country radio for Warner, noted that the song had strong sales indicative of high listener demand. He also thought that Travis did not yet have a song recorded which was "strong enough to be a single" after the success of "1982", so "On the Other Hand" was approved for a re-release by Warner in April 1986. Upon re-release, "On the Other Hand" reached number one on the Billboard country chart dated for July 26, 1986. Its success upon re-release coincided with the release of Travis's first Warner album, Storms of Life.

Chart (1985)	Peak position
US Hot Country Songs (Billboard)	67
Chart (1986)	Peak position
US Hot Country Songs (Billboard)	1
Canadian RPM Country Tracks	1

== Certifications ==
Certifications for "On the Other Hand" re-issue
Region	Certification	Certified units/sales
United States (RIAA)	Gold	500,000^{‡}
^{‡} Sales+streaming figures based on certification alone.

== Works cited ==
- Cusic, Don (1990). Randy Travis: The King of the New Country Traditionalists. St. Martin's Press. ISBN 0-312-04412-7.
