= Cowboy Boogie =

1993 single by Randy Travis

Single by Randy Travis

from the album Wind in the Wire
- Released: August 23, 1993
- Genre: Country
- Length: 2:48
- Label: Warner Bros. Nashville
- Songwriters: Stewart MacDougall and David Wilkie
- Producer: Steve Gibson

Randy Travis singles chronology
"An Old Pair of Shoes" (1993)	"Cowboy Boogie" (1993)	"Wind in the Wire" (1993)

"Cowboy Boogie" is a song co-written by Canadians Stewart MacDougall and David Wilkie and recorded by American country music singer Randy Travis. It was released in August 1993 as the lead single from his album, Wind in the Wire. It only peaked at number 46 in the United States; however it peaked at number 10 Canada.

== Music video ==
The music video was directed by Jim Shea and was premiered in August 1993. It was filmed over 9 full days in Santa Fe, New Mexico, and features Travis performing the song with a full band at an outdoor ranch, along with him riding horseback, shooting weapons, and catching a bandit like cowboys of the old days.

== Chart performance ==
"Cowboy Boogie" entered the U.S. Billboard Hot Country Singles & Tracks chart at number 75 for the week of September 4, 1993.

Chart (1993)	Peak position
Canada Country Singles (RPM)	10
US Hot Country Songs (Billboard)	46
