= Paint Me a Birmingham =

2003 American country music song

Single by Tracy Lawrence

from the album Strong
- Released: October 13, 2003
- Genre: Country
- Length: 3:47
- Label: DreamWorks Nashville 14205
- Songwriters: Buck Moore; Gary Duffy
- Producer: James Stroud

Tracy Lawrence singles chronology
"What a Memory" (2002)	"Paint Me a Birmingham" (2003)	"It's All How You Look at It" (2004)

"Paint Me a Birmingham" is a song written by Buck Moore and Gary Duffy. It was concurrently released by American country music artists Ken Mellons and Tracy Lawrence, whose versions entered the country charts within one week of each other. Lawrence's was the more successful of the two, reaching #4 in May 2004 and becoming his first Top 5 country hit since "Lessons Learned" in April 2000.

== Content ==
The narrator/singer describes an encounter with an artist who is painting ocean scenes. The singer asks the painter to paint a picture of the life the man had planned, or imagined, before losing the woman he loved. Specifically, he describes the house, a Birmingham-style house, and a scene where he and his love are together again. The song is in the key of G♭, modulating up to A♭ major at the last chorus, with a vocal range from A♭3 to D♭5.

== Music video ==
The music video was filmed live in concert.

== Chart positions ==
=== Ken Mellons ===
Chart (2003)	Peak position
US Hot Country Songs (Billboard)	54

=== Tracy Lawrence ===
Chart (2003–2004)	Peak position
Canada Country (Radio & Records)	10
US Hot Country Songs (Billboard)	4
US Billboard Hot 100	42

==== Year-end charts ====
Chart (2004)	Position
US Country Songs (Billboard)	28

== Parodies ==
On his 2004 album Bipolar and Proud, country music parodist and comedian Cledus T. Judd parodied the song as "Bake Me a Country Ham". Judd's parody reached #58 on the country music charts.
