= No Place Like Home (Randy Travis song) =

Single by Randy Travis

from the album Storms of Life
- B-side: "Send My Body"
- Released: November 24, 1986
- Genre: Country
- Length: 4:06
- Label: Warner Bros. Nashville 28525
- Songwriter(s): Paul Overstreet
- Producer(s): Kyle Lehning

Randy Travis singles chronology
"Diggin' Up Bones" (1986)	"No Place Like Home" (1986)	"Forever and Ever, Amen" (1987)

"No Place Like Home" is a song written by Paul Overstreet and recorded by American country music artist Randy Travis. It was released in November 1986 as the fourth and final single from his album Storms of Life. The song reached #2 on the Billboard Hot Country Singles chart in March 1987.

== Charts ==
=== Weekly charts ===
Chart (1986–1987)	Peak position
US Hot Country Songs (Billboard)	2
Canadian RPM Country Tracks	1
Canadian RPM Adult Contemporary Tracks	24

=== Year-end charts ===
Chart (1987)	Position
US Hot Country Songs (Billboard)	48
