= Before You Kill Us All =

Single by Randy Travis

from the album This Is Me
- B-side: "The Box"
- Released: February 28, 1994
- Recorded: 1993
- Genre: Country
- Length: 3:24
- Label: Warner Bros. Nashville 18208
- Songwriters: Max T. Barnes; Keith Follesé
- Producer: Kyle Lehning

Randy Travis singles chronology
"Wind in the Wire" (1994)	"Before You Kill Us All" (1994)	"Whisper My Name" (1994)

"Before You Kill Us All" is a song written by Max T. Barnes and Keith Follesé, and recorded by American country music singer Randy Travis. It was released in February 1994 as the lead-off single from his album, This Is Me. It peaked at number 2 in both the United States and Canada.

== Critical reception ==
Deborah Evans Price, of Billboard magazine reviewed the song favorably, saying that Travis "sounds revitalized on this desperate tale of love lost." She goes on to say that production is "uncharacteristically and refreshingly aggressive."

== Music video ==
The music video was directed by Peter Israelson, and features Travis in an animated crayon drawn world.

== Chart performance ==
"Before You Kill Us All" debuted at number 60 on the U.S. Billboard Hot Country Singles & Tracks for the week of March 12, 1994.

Chart (1994)	Peak position
Canada Country Singles (RPM)	2
US Hot Country Songs (Billboard)	2

=== Year-end charts ===
Chart (1994)	Position
Canada Country Tracks (RPM)	25
US Country Songs (Billboard)	37
