= This Is Me (Randy Travis song) =

Single by Randy Travis

from the album This Is Me
- B-side: "Gonna Walk the Line"
- Released: October 10, 1994
- Genre: Country
- Length: 3:26
- Label: Warner Bros. Nashville 18062
- Songwriters: Tom Shapiro; Thom McHugh
- Producer: Kyle Lehning

Randy Travis singles chronology
"Whisper My Name" (1994)	"This Is Me" (1994)	"The Box" (1995)

Music video
- "This Is Me" on YouTube

"This Is Me" is a song written by Tom Shapiro and Thom McHugh, and recorded by American country music artist Randy Travis. It was released in October 1994 as the third single and title track from his album, This Is Me. The song reached number 5 on the Billboard Hot Country Singles & Tracks chart in December 1994.

== Music video ==
The music video was directed by Gerry Wenner and premiered in late 1994.

== Chart performance ==
"This Is Me" debuted at number 49 on the U.S. Billboard Hot Country Singles & Tracks for the week of October 22, 1994.

Chart (1994)	Peak position
Canada Country Singles (RPM)	1
US Hot Country Songs (Billboard)	5

=== Year-end charts ===
Chart (1995)	Position
Canada Country Tracks (RPM)	90
