= Too Gone Too Long =

Single by Randy Travis

from the album Always & Forever
- B-side: "My House"
- Released: November 1987
- Genre: Country, Western swing
- Length: 2:24
- Label: Warner Bros. Nashville 28286
- Songwriter(s): Gene Pistilli
- Producer(s): Kyle Lehning

Randy Travis singles chronology
| "I Won't Need You Anymore (Always and Forever)" (1987) | "Too Gone Too Long" (1987) | "I Told You So" (1988) |

"Too Gone Too Long" is a song written by Gene Pistilli, and recorded by American country music artist Randy Travis. It was released in November 1987 as the third single from his album Always & Forever. It peaked at number 1 on the Billboard Hot Country Singles & Tracks, becoming his fifth number 1 hit in the United States. It also topped the Canadian RPM country Tracks chart.

== Content ==
When a former love reappears, the narrator tells her that since her departure he has found someone new. As badly as he missed the former love at first, she has been away for such a long time that the relationship cannot be renewed.

== Charts ==
"Too Gone Too Long" spent the week of March 12, 1988 at the top of both country singles chart.

=== Weekly charts ===
| Chart (1987–1988) | Peak position |
|---|---|
| US Hot Country Songs (Billboard) | 1 |
| Canadian RPM Country Tracks | 1 |

=== Year-end charts ===
| Chart (1988) | Position |
|---|---|
| Canadian RPM Country Tracks | 18 |
| US Hot Country Songs (Billboard) | 15 |
