= Honky Tonk Moon =

Single by Randy Travis

from the album Old 8x10
- B-side: "Young Guns"
- Released: June 1988
- Genre: Country
- Length: 2:49
- Label: Warner Bros. Nashville 27833
- Songwriter(s): Dennis O'Rourke
- Producer(s): Kyle Lehning

Randy Travis singles chronology
"I Told You So" (1988)	"Honky Tonk Moon" (1988)	"Deeper Than the Holler" (1988)

"Honky Tonk Moon" is a song written by Dennis O'Rourke, and recorded by American country music artist Randy Travis. It was released in June 1988 as the lead off single from his album Old 8x10. It became his seventh and fifth consecutive number 1 hit in the United States. It peaked at number 1 on the Billboard Hot Country Singles & Tracks chart.

== Content ==
The B-side of the 7" vinyl single, "Young Guns", co-written by Randy Travis, has not been released on any of his albums.

== Chart performance ==
"Honky Tonk Moon" spent one week beginning October 8, 1988 at the top of The Billboard Hot Country Songs chart.

=== Weekly charts ===
Chart (1988)	Peak position
US Hot Country Songs (Billboard)	1
Canadian RPM Country Tracks	1

=== Year-end charts ===
Chart (1988)	Position
Canadian RPM Country Tracks	17
US Hot Country Songs (Billboard)	48
