= Heroes and Friends =

Single by Randy Travis

from the album Heroes & Friends
- B-side: "Shopping for Dresses" (w/ Loretta Lynn)
- Released: January 1991
- Genre: Country
- Length: 3:12 (long version); 2:10 (album version); 1:58 (reprise)
- Label: Warner Bros. Nashville 19469
- Songwriters: Don Schlitz; Randy Travis
- Producer: Kyle Lehning

Randy Travis singles chronology
"A Few Ole Country Boys" (1990)	"Heroes and Friends" (1991)	"Point of Light" (1991)

"Heroes and Friends" is a song recorded by American country music artist Randy Travis. It was released in January 1991 as the second and final single from his album of duets, Heroes & Friends and his only song on the album that was not a duet. The song opens and closes the album. "Heroes and Friends" peaked at No. 3 on the Billboard Hot Country Singles & Tracks chart and reached No. 1 (his fourteenth No. 1) on the Canadian RPM Country Tracks chart. It was written by Travis and Don Schlitz.

== Background and writing ==
Travis recalled the beginnings of the song on his website: "Lib (Travis' Wife and manager Elizabeth "Lib" Hatcher) came up with that title for the duets album, and I thought it would make a wonderful song title. I was sitting backstage in Scotland one night and for some reason or other I thought of a way to write the song. I started the first verse and wrote a few lines before I had to quit to do the show. I stuck it in my pocket and actually forgot about it until I got back to Nashville and Don Schlitz and I sat down and finished it."

== Content ==
This song sets the theme for the rest of the album. The narrator says that the two things that one can depend on forever are heroes and friends. A reprise of the song closes the album with the chorus being sung by everyone who sang on the album with Travis.

Two different versions were released for radio airplay. One version has just one refrain (after the second verse), with the background vocalists -- some of the legends that joined him throughout the album -- subdued in the background. The longer radio edit repeats the refrain twice following the second voice, with the legends chorus more prominent; a longer fiddle coda is played as well, whereas on the shorter radio edit the song fades almost immediately after the final refrain ends.

== Music video ==
The music video was directed by Mark Coppos and premiered in late 1990.

The music video features Travis singing the song in a recording studio, as well as old footage of Roy Rogers and Dale Evans from their television series and movies. Roy Rogers himself makes an appearance near the end of the video.

== Chart performance ==
This song spent two consecutive weeks at number 1 on the RPM country Tracks chart beginning April 20, 1991.

Chart (1991)	Peak position
Canada Country Singles (RPM)	1
US Hot Country Songs (Billboard)	3

=== Year-end charts ===
Chart (1991)	Position
Canada Country Tracks (RPM)	10
US Country Songs (Billboard)	30
