= Promises (Randy Travis song) =

Single by Randy Travis

from the album Old 8x10
- B-side: "Written in Stone"
- Released: May 29, 1989
- Genre: Country
- Length: 4:01
- Label: Warner Bros. Nashville
- Songwriters: Randy Travis, John Lindley
- Producer: Kyle Lehning

Randy Travis singles chronology
"Is It Still Over?" (1989)	"Promises" (1989)	"It's Just a Matter of Time" (1989)

"Promises" is a song co-written and recorded by American country music singer Randy Travis. It was originally released in March 1987 as the B-side of "Forever and Ever, Amen" but in a different version. It was later re-recorded and released as the A-side in May 1989 as the fourth and final single from his album, Old 8x10, peaking at number 17 in the United States and number 12 in Canada. The song was written by Travis and John Lindley.

== Chart performance ==
Chart (1989)	Peak position
Canada Country Singles (RPM)	12
US Hot Country Songs (Billboard)	17

=== Cover versions ===
Daryle Singletary covered the song on his 2007 album Straight from the Heart.
