= Diggin' Up Bones =

Single by Randy Travis

from the album Storms of Life
- B-side: "There'll Always be a Honky Tonk Somewhere"
- Released: August 4, 1986
- Recorded: 1985
- Genre: Country
- Length: 2:58
- Label: Warner Bros. Nashville 28649
- Songwriters: Al Gore, Paul Overstreet, Nat Stuckey
- Producer: Kyle Lehning

Randy Travis singles chronology
"1982" (1985)	"Diggin' Up Bones" (1986)	"No Place Like Home" (1986)

"Diggin' Up Bones" is a song written by Paul Overstreet, Al Gore, and Nat Stuckey, and recorded by American country music artist Randy Travis. It was released in August 1986 as the third single from his album Storms of Life. It peaked at number-one in both the United States and Canada.

== Other versions ==
- Mel Tillis - on his album California Road (1985)

== Charts ==
Chart (1986)	Peak position
US Hot Country Songs (Billboard)	1
Canadian RPM Country Tracks	1

== Certifications ==
Region	Certification	Certified units/sales
United States (RIAA)	Gold	500,000^{‡}
^{‡} Sales+streaming figures based on certification alone.
