= Storms of Life =

Studio album by Randy Travis
- Released: June 2, 1986
- Recorded: 1985
- Studio: Emerald Sound Studio, GroundStar Lab, Morning Star Studio, Sound Stage Studio, Nashville, TN
- Genre: Neotraditional country
- Length: 31:45
- Label: Warner Bros. Nashville
- Producer: Kyle Lehning; Keith Stegall

Randy Travis chronology
Storms of Life (1986)	Always & Forever (1987)

Singles from Storms of Life
- 1. "On the Other Hand" Released: July 29, 1985; 2. "1982" Released: December 2, 1985; 3. "Diggin' Up Bones" Released: August 4, 1986; 4. "No Place Like Home" Released: November 24, 1986

Professional ratings
Review scores
Source	Rating
AllMusic	link
Chicago Tribune	favorable link
Robert Christgau	link
Rolling Stone	favorable link

Storms of Life is the debut studio album by American country music artist Randy Travis. It was released on June 2, 1986, by Warner Records. Certified 3× Multi-Platinum by the RIAA for American shipments of three million copies. it features the singles "On the Other Hand" (previously recorded by Keith Whitley on his 1985 album L.A. to Miami), "1982", "Diggin' up Bones" and "No Place Like Home". Although "On the Other Hand" charted at number 67 on the Hot Country Songs chart upon its initial release, the song reached number one on the same chart once it was re-released, following "1982," which peaked at number six. "Diggin' up Bones" also reached number one, while "No Place Like Home" peaked at number two.

"There'll Always Be a Honky Tonk Somewhere" was later recorded by Daron Norwood for his second album Ready, Willing and Able.

The 35th anniversary edition of the album was released on September 24, 2021. The anniversary edition includes remastered versions of the original ten tracks, as well as three previously unreleased songs ("Ain't No Use", "The Wall", and "Carryin' Fire"), labelled "From the Vault".

== Track listing ==
No.	Title	Writer(s)	Length
1.	"On the Other Hand"	Paul Overstreet; Don Schlitz	3:06
2.	"The Storms of Life"	Max D. Barnes; Troy Seals	2:45
3.	"My Heart Cracked (But It Did Not Break)"	Ronny Scaife; Don Singleton; Phil Thomas	2:20
4.	"Diggin' Up Bones"	Al Gore; Overstreet; Nat Stuckey	3:01
5.	"No Place Like Home"	Overstreet	4:08
6.	"1982"	Buddy Blackmon; Vip Vipperman	2:59
7.	"Send My Body"	Randy Travis	3:02
8.	"Messin' with My Mind"	Joe Allen; Charlie Williams	3:07
9.	"Reasons I Cheat"	Travis	4:23
10.	"There'll Always Be a Honky Tonk Somewhere"	Steve Clark; Johnny MacRae	3:13

35th Anniversary Deluxe Edition
No.	Title	Writer(s)	Length
11.	"Carryin' Fire"	Sam Beck; Red Lane; Jim Ray	3:37
12.	"Ain't No Use"	Jim Lindley; Travis	2:58
13.	"The Wall"	Lee Fry; Jim Sales; Phil Thomas	3:02

== Personnel ==
- Baillie & the Boys – background vocals
- Eddie Bayers – drums
- Kenny Bell – acoustic guitar
- Thomas Brannon – background vocals
- Dennis Burnside – keyboards
- Larry Byrom – acoustic guitar, electric guitar
- Mark Casstevens – acoustic guitar
- Paul Davis – background vocals
- Jerry Douglas – dobro
- Phil Forrest – background vocals
- Steve Gibson – electric guitar
- Doyle Grisham – steel guitar
- Mark Hembree – acoustic bass
- Hoot Hester – fiddle
- David Hungate – bass guitar
- Don Jackson – clarinet
- Greg Jennings – electric guitar
- Kirk "Jelly Roll" Johnson – harmonica, percussion
- Shane Keister – keyboards
- Kyle Lehning – keyboards, background vocals
- Larrie Londin – drums
- Terry McMillan – harmonica, percussion
- Fred Newell – electric guitar
- Mark O'Connor – fiddle, mandolin
- Paul Overstreet – background vocals
- Michael Rhodes – bass guitar
- Lisa Silver – background vocals
- Blaine Sprouse – fiddle
- Diane Stegall – background vocals
- Keith Stegall – electric guitar
- James Stroud – Synthesizers, Drums and Linn Drum
- Bobby Thompson – acoustic guitar
- Randy Travis – lead vocals
- Jack Williams – bass guitar
- Bobby Wood – keyboards

== Charts ==
=== Weekly charts ===
Chart (1986)	Peak position
Canadian Albums (RPM)	61
US Billboard 200	85
US Top Country Albums (Billboard)	1

=== Year-end charts ===
Chart (1986)	Position
US Top Country Albums (Billboard)	19
Chart (1987)	Position
US Top Country Albums (Billboard)	1
Chart (1988)	Position
US Top Country Albums (Billboard)	11
Chart (1989)	Position
US Top Country Albums (Billboard)	26
Chart (1990)	Position
US Top Country Albums (Billboard)	47

== Certifications ==
Region	Certification	Certified units/sales
Australia (ARIA)	Gold	35,000^{^}
United States (RIAA)	3× Platinum	3,000,000^{^}
^{^} Shipments figures based on certification alone.
