= Is It Still Over? =

Single by Randy Travis

from the album Old 8x10
- B-side: "Here in My Heart"
- Released: January 1989
- Genre: Country
- Length: 3:11
- Label: Warner Bros. Nashville 27551
- Songwriters: Ken Bell, Larry Henley
- Producer: Kyle Lehning

Randy Travis singles chronology
"Deeper Than the Holler" (1988)	"Is It Still Over?" (1989)	"Promises" (1989)

"Is It Still Over?" is a song co-written by Ken Bell and Larry Henley and recorded by American country music artist Randy Travis. It was released in January 1989 as the third single from his album, Old 8x10. The single was his ninth as well as his seventh consecutive number 1 hit in the United States. It peaked at number 1 on both the Billboard Hot Country Singles & Tracks chart and the Canadian RPM country Tracks chart. This song was also featured in National Treasure: Book of Secrets in the scene at Mount Vernon.

== Chart performance ==
Chart (1989)	Peak position
Canada Country Singles (RPM)	1
US Hot Country Songs (Billboard)	1

=== Year-end charts ===
Chart (1989)	Position
Canada Country Tracks (RPM)	16
US Country Songs (Billboard)	53
