= Three Wooden Crosses =

Single by Randy Travis

from the album Rise and Shine
- Released: November 25, 2002
- Genre: Country gospel
- Length: 3:21
- Label: Word Music/Curb
- Songwriters: Kim Williams; Doug Johnson
- Producer: Kyle Lehning

Randy Travis singles chronology
"America Will Always Stand" (2001)	"Three Wooden Crosses" (2002)	"Pray for the Fish" (2003)

"Three Wooden Crosses" is a song written by Kim Williams and Doug Johnson, and recorded by American country music singer Randy Travis. It was released in November 2002 from his album, Rise and Shine. The song became Travis' 16th and final Number One single, his first since "Whisper My Name" in 1994. "Three Wooden Crosses" was named Song of the Year by the Country Music Association in 2003 and won a Dove Award from the Gospel Music Association as Country Song of the Year in 2004.

== Content ==
The song describes four passengers on a midnight bus traveling from the United States to Mexico: a farmer on vacation, a teacher seeking higher education, a prostitute, and a preacher, both of whom were "searching for lost souls". The bus is involved in a fatal accident when the bus driver does not see a stop sign and the bus is hit by an 18-wheeler which kills three of the four passengers; the lyrics ask why there are only three crosses at the site of the accident and not four. (There is no mention of what happened to the drivers of either vehicle.)

The song mentions that the farmer and teacher were killed in the wreck, with the farmer leaving a harvest and a son who would follow in his footsteps, and the teacher leaving wisdom with the children she taught. It also mentions that the preacher laid his bloodstained Bible in the hands of the prostitute, asking her if she could "see the Promised Land" prior to her own death.

The end of the song reveals that the story about the passengers was told to the narrator by a preacher during a Sunday church service. In a twist, however, it reveals that the preacher who told the story is not the preacher from the bus, but rather the son of the prostitute, holding up the bloodstained Bible as proof. This reveals that the prostitute was the passenger that survived the accident, who read the Bible that had been given to her by the dying preacher to her son, leading him to eventually become a preacher himself.

== Critical reception ==
Deborah Evans Price, of Billboard magazine reviewed the song favorably, calling it a "beautifully written tale of faith and redemption." She goes on to say that Travis has never sounded better, "and his warm baritone perfectly conveys every nuance in the lyric."

== Chart performance ==
"Three Wooden Crosses" debuted at number 52 on the Hot Country Singles & Tracks chart dated December 7, 2002. It charted for 34 weeks on that chart, and reached number 1 on the chart dated May 24, 2003, giving Travis his sixteenth Number One single, his first Billboard Number One since "Whisper My Name" in 1994. In addition, it reached the Top 40 on the Billboard Hot 100 chart (peaking at #31), making it his first and (excluding guest singles) only top-40 hit on that chart.

Chart (2002–2003)	Peak position
US Hot Country Songs (Billboard)	1
US Billboard Hot 100	31

=== Year-end charts ===
Chart (2003)	Position
US Country Songs (Billboard)	17

== Certifications ==
Region	Certification	Certified units/sales
United States (RIAA)	Platinum	1,000,000^{‡}
^{‡} Sales+streaming figures based on certification alone.
