= Ken Mellons =

American country music artist (born 1965)

- Born: Kenneth Edward Mellons; July 10, 1965 (age 61)
- Origin: Kingsport, Tennessee, U.S.
- Genre: Country
- Occupation: Singer-songwriter
- Instruments: Vocals, guitar
- Years active: 1993–present
- Labels: Epic, Curb, Home
- Website: http://www.kenmellons.net

Kenneth Edward Mellons (born July 10, 1965) is an American country music artist who released his self-titled debut album in 1994. This album produced the single "Jukebox Junkie", a Top Ten hit on the Hot Country Songs charts. Mellons followed up his debut album with three more albums – 1995's Where Forever Begins, 2001's The Best of Ken Mellons and 2004's Sweet — in addition to charting six more singles on the country charts.

== Biography ==
Mellons was born in Kingsport, Tennessee. He has been a native of Nashville, Tennessee since the age of 3. He entered in many talent shows in high school, and played at various clubs around Nashville to help perfect his skill, while working day jobs to pay the bills. In 1989, Ken earned a spot at a show called Country Music USA at Opryland USA, a theme park in Nashville. Later, he was signed to Epic Records in 1993. His debut, self-titled album produced a Top 10 single in "Jukebox Junkie", a song which also received ASCAP and BMI awards for surpassing one million spins on radio. His second album, Where Forever Begins, failed to produce any successful singles, and by 1997, Mellons left Epic Records.

Shortly after leaving Epic, Mellons signed to Curb Records. He released two non-charting singles and one album (The Best of Ken Mellons) during his six-year tenure with Curb. He became frustrated with the label and asked out of his record deal with them in 2003. Mellons then moved to the independent Home Records, releasing the album Sweet in 2004. The album featured "Paint Me a Birmingham", which became a Top 5 country hit for Tracy Lawrence in the first half of 2004. Mellons also co-wrote the songs "Honk If You Honky Tonk" on George Strait's "Honkytonkville" album and "I Bought The Shoes" on Dierks Bentley's self-titled debut album.

Mellons continues to perform throughout the US and recorded a bluegrass album titled Rural Route in 2010.

== Discography ==
=== Albums ===
Title	Album details	Peak chart positions	
Title	Album details	US Country	US Heat
Ken Mellons	Release date: August 23, 1994; Label: Epic Records	42	8
Where Forever Begins	Release date: November 14, 1995; Label: Epic Records	—	—
The Best of Ken Mellons	Release date: April 3, 2001; Label: Curb Records	—	—
Sweet	Release date: July 27, 2004; Label: Home Records	—	—
Rural Route	Release date: October 12, 2010; Label: Jukebox Junkie Inc.	—	—
"—" denotes releases that did not chart

=== Singles ===
Year	Single	Peak chart positions		Album
Year	Single	US Country	CAN Country	Album
1994	"Lookin' in the Same Direction"	55	52	Ken Mellons
1994	"Jukebox Junkie"	8	6	Ken Mellons
1994	"I Can Bring Her Back"	42	49	Ken Mellons
1995	"Workin' for the Weekend"	40	40	Ken Mellons
1995	"Rub-a-Dubbin'"	39	65	Where Forever Begins
1995	"Stranger in Your Eyes"	55	89	Where Forever Begins
1998	"Ladies Night"	—	—	Non-album singles
1998	"Bundle of Nerves"	—	—	Non-album singles
2003	"Paint Me a Birmingham"	54	—	Sweet
2004	"Climb My Tree"	—	—	Sweet
2009	"Still They Call Me Love"	—	—	Rural Route
"—" denotes releases that did not chart

=== Music videos ===
Year	Video	Director
1994	"Lookin' in the Same Direction"	Marc Ball
1994	"Jukebox Junkie"	Marc Ball
1994	"I Can Bring Her Back"	Jeffrey Phillips
1995	"Rub-a-Dubbin'"	Jon Small
1998	"Ladies Night"	chris rogers
