= I Won't Need You Anymore (Always and Forever) =

Single by Randy Travis

from the album Always & Forever
- B-side: "Tonight I'm Walkin' Out on the Blues"
- Released: August 1987
- Genre: Country
- Length: 3:08
- Label: Warner Bros. Nashville 28246
- Songwriter(s): Max D. Barnes & Troy Seals
- Producer(s): Kyle Lehning

Randy Travis singles chronology
"Forever and Ever, Amen" (1987)	"I Won't Need You Anymore (Always and Forever)" (1987)	"Too Gone Too Long" (1987)

"I Won't Need You Anymore (Always and Forever)" is a song written by Max D. Barnes and Troy Seals, and first recorded by American country music artist George Jones on his 1981 album Still the Same Ole Me, and later recorded by American country music artist Randy Travis. It was released in August 1987 as the second single from his album Always & Forever. It became his fourth number-one hit. It peaked at number one on both the Billboard Hot Country Singles & Tracks and the Canadian RPM Country Tracks chart.

== Charts ==
=== Weekly charts ===
Chart (1987)	Peak position
US Hot Country Songs (Billboard)	1
Canadian RPM Country Tracks	1

=== Year-end charts ===
Chart (1987)	Position
US Hot Country Songs (Billboard)	43
