= I Told You So (Randy Travis song) =

1988 song by Randy Travis

Single by Randy Travis

from the album Always & Forever
- B-side: "Good Intentions"
- Released: March 1988
- Recorded: 1987
- Length: 3:40
- Label: Warner Bros. Nashville
- Songwriter: Randy Travis
- Producer: Kyle Lehning

Randy Travis singles chronology
"Too Gone Too Long" (1987)	"I Told You So" (1988)	"Honky Tonk Moon" (1988)

"I Told You So" is a song written and recorded by American country music singer Randy Travis from his 1987 album, Always & Forever. It reached number one on the U.S. Billboard and Canadian RPM country singles charts in June 1988. Travis had first recorded it on his 1983 album Live at the Nashville Palace under his stage name "Randy Ray". In 2007, the song was covered by Carrie Underwood on her album Carnival Ride. Her version was released in February 2009 and was re-recorded and re-released in March as a duet with Travis. Underwood's and Travis' duet peaked at number two on the U.S. country charts in 2009.

== Randy Travis version ==
Randy Travis wrote "I Told You So" in 1982 and originally recorded it that same year with the intent of signing with Curb Records to release it. However, the label never signed him. He later included it on his 1983 album Randy Ray Live at the Nashville Palace under the stage name Randy Ray. The song was also offered to Lee Greenwood, who declined to record it. Barbara Mandrell also recorded the song but did not release it, and Darrell Clanton also recorded it as the B-side of his 1985 single "I Forgot That I Don't Live Here Anymore". Jeanne Pruett recorded it for her 1985 self-titled album on Dot Records.

Travis later re-recorded it for his album Always & Forever and released it as a single. His rendition was a Number One hit on the Billboard country charts, peaking in June 1988 and spending two weeks at that position.

== Carrie Underwood version ==
"I Told You So"

Single by Carrie Underwood featuring Randy Travis

from the album Carnival Ride
- Released: February 2, 2009
- Length: 4:17 (album version/duet version); 3:53 (solo radio edit)
- Label: Arista Nashville
- Songwriter: Randy Travis
- Producer: Mark Bright

Carrie Underwood singles chronology
"Just a Dream" (2008)	"I Told You So" (2009)	"Home Sweet Home" (2009)

Live video
- "Carrie Underwood – I Told You So" on YouTube

Carrie Underwood released a cover version of the song on her 2007 album, Carnival Ride; it was the fifth and final single released from the album. Her version of the song was featured on the album Now That's What I Call Country Volume 2. Underwood's version has been certified Platinum by the RIAA.

=== Critical reception ===
Matt Bjorke of Roughstock called the song "very much a welcomed addition to the charts." He also states that Underwood may "'over sing' the title a bit in the chorus", but "the rest of the song is no doubt her best and truest country single to date." Kevin J. Coyne of Country Universe gave the duet version of the song an A, saying even though these voices are far too strong for one to blend into the background of the other, the soft purity of Underwood’s voice perfectly complements the ragged twang of Travis’s ragged vocal.

Engine 145 critic Brady Vercher gave Underwood's rendition a "thumbs down" rating, saying "When she delivers the chorus she’s just a woman singing a song. Although technically proficient, it’s not very moving."

=== Music video ===
A music video for the single was released February 12, 2009 on CMT.com. It consists of Underwood performing the song at the Grand Ole Opry in a short, black dress. Before the performance, she states that "I Told You So" has always been "one of [her] favorites growing up". After the performance, Randy Travis comes out from the back of the stage and compliments Underwood. He said he was going to perform that song that night, but after hearing Underwood, he decided not to. He told her that the song is "far better suited" for Underwood's vocals than his own.

== Duet version ==
A duet version of "I Told You So" featuring Underwood and Travis was released on March 17, 2009 to country radio airwaves. A digital single of the recording was made available for sale online to coincide with their American Idol performance on March 18, 2009. From the chart week of March 28, 2009 on, the song was credited to Underwood and Travis and marks Travis' first Top 40 single on the country charts since "Three Wooden Crosses" in 2002. The duet version won Underwood and Travis a Grammy Award for Best Country Collaboration with Vocals at the 52nd Grammy Awards.

=== Performances ===
Celebrating the Grand Ole Opry Week on the eighth season of American Idol and as Travis being their mentor, Underwood and Travis performed their duet for the first time live and on television. On April 5, 2009, she again performed this song at the 2009 Academy of Country Music Awards where she won her very first honor as ACM Entertainer of the Year.

== Charts ==
Travis' version was released in 1988 and peaked at number one on the Hot Country Songs in June of that year and spending two weeks at that position. Underwood's version of the song debuted on the Hot Country Songs chart at number 38 for the week January 19, 2009, two weeks before its release date. On the issue date April 4, 2009, the song rose 48 positions from number fifty-seven to number nine on the Billboard Hot 100, making it Underwood's fourth Top 10 on the chart, and Travis' highest Hot 100 peak. With a peak of number two on the country charts, it became Underwood's second single to not reach number one along "Don't Forget to Remember Me" and "Mama's Song" which also both peaked at number two in 2006 and 2011 respectively, breaking a string of six consecutive country number one hits. As of January 2013, the single was certified Platinum, according to RIAA and has sold 1,089,000 copies as of November 2015

=== Randy Travis version ===
Chart (1988)	Peak position
US Hot Country Songs (Billboard)	1
Canada Country Tracks (RPM)	1

=== Year-end charts ===
Chart (1988)	Position
Canadian RPM Country Tracks	3
US Hot Country Songs (Billboard)	38

=== Carrie Underwood and Randy Travis duet version ===
Chart (2009)	Peak position
Canada Hot 100 (Billboard)	18
Canada Country (Billboard)	1
UK Singles (Official Charts Company)	129
US Billboard Hot 100	9
US Hot Country Songs (Billboard)	2
US Pop 100 (Billboard)	25

=== Year-end charts ===
Chart (2009)	Position
US Country Songs (Billboard)	28

=== Certifications ===
Certification for "I Told You So" Randy Travis version
Region	Certification	Certified units/sales
United States (RIAA)	Gold	500,000^{‡}
^{‡} Sales+streaming figures based on certification alone.

Certification for "I Told You So" Carrie Underwood version
Region	Certification	Certified units/sales
United States (RIAA)	Platinum	1,000,000^{^}
^{^} Shipments figures based on certification alone.

=== Release history ===
Region	Date	Format	Label
Norway	March 16, 2009	Music download	Sony Music/Arista Nashville
United States	March 17, 2009	Airplay	Arista Nashville
Canada	March 17, 2009	Airplay	Sony Music
United Kingdom	March 17, 2009	Airplay	Sony Music
Italy	March 17, 2009	Music download	Sony Music
New Zealand	March 17, 2009	Music download	Sony Music
Luxembourg	March 17, 2009	Music download	Sony Music
Mexico	March 17, 2009	Music download	Sony Music
Ireland	March 17, 2009	Music download	Sony Music
Denmark	March 17, 2009	Music download	Sony Music
Netherlands	March 17, 2009	Music download	Sony Music
Belgium	March 17, 2009	Music download	Sony Music
Greece	March 17, 2009	Music download	Sony Music
France	March 17, 2009	Music download	Sony Music
Spain	March 17, 2009	Music download	Sony Music
United States	March 18, 2009	Music download	Arista Nashville
Canada	March 18, 2009	Music download	Sony Music
United Kingdom	March 18, 2009	Music download	Sony Music

== Awards ==
=== Randy Travis ===
==== 1989 American Music Awards ====
Year	Nominee / work	Award	Result
1989	"I Told You So"	Country Single of the Year	Won

=== Carrie Underwood and Randy Travis ===
==== 2009 Country Music Association Awards ====
Year	Nominee / work	Award	Result
2009	"I Told You So"	Musical Event of the Year	Nominated

==== 52nd Grammy Awards ====
Year	Nominee / work	Award	Result
2010	"I Told You So"	Best Country Collaboration with Vocals	Won

==== 2010 Academy of Country Music Awards ====
Year	Nominee / work	Award	Result
2010	"I Told You So"	Vocal Event of the Year	Nominated
