= 1982 (Randy Travis song) =

Single by Randy Travis

from the album Storms of Life
- B-side: "Reasons I Cheat"
- Released: December 2, 1985
- Recorded: 1985
- Genre: Country
- Length: 2:59
- Label: Warner Bros. Nashville
- Songwriter(s): James "Buddy" Blackmon; Carl "Vip" Vipperman
- Producer(s): Kyle Lehning

Randy Travis singles chronology
"On the Other Hand" (1985)	"1982" (1985)	"On the Other Hand" (1986)

"1982" is a song written by Buddy Blackmon and Vip Vipperman, and recorded by American country music singer Randy Travis. It was released in December 1985 as the second single from his album Storms of Life. It peaked at number 6 on the Hot Country Singles & Tracks (now Hot Country Songs) chart, and number 5 in Canada. Garth Brooks covered the song for his 2016 box-set The Ultimate Collection.

== Content ==
The song's narrator recalls a time when his former lover was all his back in the year 1982. According to American Country Countdown (1986 airing, Clear Channel network), the original title of this song was "1962." However, Travis said that he didn't feel comfortable singing about a love that he lost when he was only a little over two years old. He and producer Kyle Lehning revised the lyric to refer to 1982, as they felt it was more believable because it would have only been three years before the time of the recording.

== Chart performance ==
Chart (1985–1986)	Peak position
US Hot Country Songs (Billboard)	6
Canadian RPM Country Tracks	5
