= Forever and Ever, Amen =

- Single cover

Single by Randy Travis

from the album Always & Forever
- B-side: "Promises"
- Released: March 1987
- Recorded: January 1987
- Genre: Country
- Length: 3:31
- Label: Warner Bros. Nashville 28384
- Songwriters: Paul Overstreet; Don Schlitz
- Producer: Kyle Lehning

Randy Travis singles chronology
"No Place Like Home" (1987)	"Forever and Ever, Amen" (1987)	"I Won't Need You Anymore (Always and Forever)" (1987)

Official video
- "Forever and Ever, Amen" on YouTube

"Forever and Ever, Amen" is a song written by Paul Overstreet and Don Schlitz, and recorded by American country music artist Randy Travis. It was released in March 1987 as the first single from the album Always & Forever and became Travis's third No. 1 single on the U.S. Billboard Hot Country Singles charts.

Since 2017, Travis, whose singing has been severely limited since a 2013 stroke, has on several occasions contributed the final "Amen" to live performances by other artists when he is in attendance.

In August 2020, Josh Turner recorded a cover version of "Forever and Ever, Amen" featuring Travis on his album Country State of Mind. This was Travis' first recording since his stroke.

In February 2021, Ronan Keating and Shania Twain released a version as the fifth and final single from Keating's eleventh studio album, Twenty Twenty.

== Background ==
"Forever and Ever, Amen" was penned by songwriters Paul Overstreet and Don Schlitz, both Nashville luminaries with a long pedigree of domestic country hits, including songs by Alabama, Keith Whitley, Kenny Rogers, and the Judds in the 1980s. The idea for the song's title stemmed from Schlitz's son, who, after saying his nightly prayers, would often remark to his mother, "Mommy, I love you forever and ever, amen." Schlitz relayed the sentimental message to Overstreet, and the two wrote the song in a couple of hours. They recorded the demo version of the song the next day, and pitched it to Warner Bros. executive Martha Sharp. Sharp suggested the material would be best for Travis, for whom Overstreet had previously written "On the Other Hand".

Travis was fond of the song immediately, and abridged its message for the title of his second album, Always & Forever.

== Critical reception ==
The single was first released in March 1987. It debuted on Billboard's country charts on April 25, 1987. The song peaked at number one for three weeks on June 13, 1987, the first single to do so on the country charts since Johnny Lee's "Lookin' for Love" seven years prior.

"Forever and Ever, Amen" was heavily lauded in the country community, as well as on a mainstream level. It won a Grammy for Best Country & Western Song at the 30th Annual Grammy Awards in 1988. It also claimed Song of the Year honors from the Academy of Country Music and the Country Music Association. Nearly three decades past its release, it was certified Gold by the RIAA, making it Travis' first solo single to earn an RIAA certification. Its digital sales were estimated at over 966,000 downloads as of 2016.

In 2024, Rolling Stone ranked the song at No. 48 on its 200 Greatest Country Songs of All Time ranking.

== Charts ==
=== Weekly charts ===
Chart (1987)	Peak position
US Hot Country Songs (Billboard)	1
Canadian RPM Country Tracks	1
Canadian RPM Adult Contemporary Tracks	10
UK Singles Chart	55

Chart (2021)	Peak position
Canada Digital Song Sales (Billboard)	29

=== Year-end charts ===
Chart (1987)	Position
US Hot Country Songs (Billboard)	14

== Certifications ==
Region	Certification	Certified units/sales
New Zealand (RMNZ)	Platinum	30,000^{‡}
United Kingdom (BPI)	Silver	200,000^{‡}
United States (RIAA)	2× Platinum	966,000
^{‡} Sales+streaming figures based on certification alone.
