= Whisper My Name =

Single by Randy Travis

from the album This Is Me
- B-side: "Oscar The Angel"
- Released: June 6, 1994
- Genre: Country
- Length: 3:09
- Label: Warner Bros. Nashville 18153
- Songwriter: Trey Bruce
- Producer: Kyle Lehning

Randy Travis singles chronology
"Before You Kill Us All" (1994)	"Whisper My Name" (1994)	"This Is Me" (1995)

"Whisper My Name" is a song written by Trey Bruce, and recorded by American country music artist Randy Travis. It was released in June 1994 as the second single from his album This Is Me. It became a Number One country hit for him in both the United States and Canada.

== Critical reception ==
Thom Jurek of Allmusic cited the song as a standout track in his review of the album, saying it was "among the greatest songs Travis has ever recorded. The backing vocals by Suzy Ragsdale, Darrell Scott, and Verlon Thompson set the tune apart and accent what a grateful love song this is."

== Chart performance ==
"Whisper My Name" debuted at number 67 on the U.S. Billboard Hot Country Singles & Tracks for the week of June 11, 1994.

Chart (1994)	Peak position
Canada Country Singles (RPM)	1
US Hot Country Songs (Billboard)	1

=== Year-end charts ===
Chart (1994)	Position
Canada Country Tracks (RPM)	12
US Country Songs (Billboard)	24
