= Vern Gosdin discography =

Musician

- Studio albums: 14
- Compilation albums: 6
- Singles: 41

Vern Gosdin was an American country music artist. His discography consists of 14 studio albums and 41 singles. Of his singles, 41 charted on the U.S. Billboard Hot Country Songs charts between 1976 and 1993.

== Studio albums ==
Title	Album details	Peak positions	Certifications (sales threshold)
Title	Album details	US Country	Certifications (sales threshold)
Sounds of Goodbye (as The Gosdin Brothers)	Release date: September 1968; Label: Capitol Records	39	
Till the End	Release date: July 1977; Label: Elektra Records	10	
Never My Love	Release date: May 1978; Label: Elektra Records	24	
You've Got Somebody	Release date: March 1979; Label: Elektra Records	—	
Today My World Slipped Away	Release date: March 1982; Label: AMI Records	30	
If You're Gonna Do Me Wrong (Do It Right)	Release date: April 11, 1983; Label: Compleat Records	17	
There Is a Season^{[A]}	Release date: April 12, 1984; Label: Compleat Records	17	
If Jesus Comes Tomorrow (What Then)^{[B]}	Release date: September 3, 1984; Label: Compleat Records	—	
Time Stood Still	Release date: April 1985; Label: Compleat Records	31	
Chiseled in Stone	Release date: January 15, 1988; Label: Columbia Records	7	US: Gold
Alone	Release date: June 14, 1989; Label: Columbia Records	11	
10 Years of Greatest Hits – Newly Recorded	Release date: August 10, 1990; Label: Columbia Records	21	US: Gold
Out of My Heart	Release date: May 17, 1991; Label: Columbia Records	41	
Nickels and Dimes and Love	Release date: March 23, 1993; Label: Columbia Records	—	
The Voice	Release date: September 15, 1998; Label: Beckett and Tharp	—	
"—" denotes releases that did not chart

== Compilation albums ==
Title	Album details	Peak positions	Certifications (sales threshold)
Title	Album details	US Country	Certifications (sales threshold)
The Best of Vern Gosdin	Release date: September 1979; Label: Elektra Records	—	
Vern Gosdin's Greatest Hits	Release date: October 1986; Label: Compleat Records	48	
Super Hits	Release date: August 27, 1993; Label: Columbia Records	—	US: Gold
Very Best of the Voice	Release date: July 19, 2005; Label: Music Mill Entertainment	—	
Country: Vern Gosdin	Release date: September 4, 2012; Label: Legacy Recordings	63	
"—" denotes releases that did not chart

== Singles ==
Year	Title	Peak positions		Album
Year	Title	US Country	CAN Country	Album
1967	"Hangin' On" (as The Gosdin Brothers)	37	—	—
1976	"Hangin' On" (re-recording)	16	15	Till the End
1977	"Yesterday's Gone"	9	11	Till the End
1977	"Till the End"	7	37	Till the End
1977	"Mother Country Music"	17	27	Till the End
1978	"It Started All Over Again"	23	—	Till the End
1978	"Never My Love"	9	30	Never My Love
1978	"Break My Mind"	13	17	Never My Love
1979	"You've Got Somebody, I've Got Somebody"	16	27	You've Got Somebody
1979	"All I Want and Need Forever"	21	52	You've Got Somebody
1979	"Sarah's Eyes"	57	—	You've Got Somebody
1981	"Too Long Gone"	28	—	Today My World Slipped Away
1981	"Dream of Me"	7	—	Today My World Slipped Away
1982	"Don't Ever Leave Me Again"	28	—	Today My World Slipped Away
1982	"Your Bedroom Eyes"	22	—	Today My World Slipped Away
1982	"Today My World Slipped Away"	10	—	Today My World Slipped Away
1983	"Friday Night Feelin'"	49	—	—
1983	"If You're Gonna Do Me Wrong (Do It Right)"	5	39	If You're Gonna Do Me Wrong (Do It Right)
1983	"Way Down Deep"	5	3	If You're Gonna Do Me Wrong (Do It Right)
1983	"I Wonder Where We'd Be Tonight"	10	10	If You're Gonna Do Me Wrong (Do It Right)
1984	"I Can Tell by the Way You Dance (You're Gonna Love Me Tonight)"	1	1	There Is a Season
1984	"What Would Your Memories Do"	10	9	There Is a Season
1984	"Slow Burning Memory"	10	7	There Is a Season
1985	"Dim Lights, Thick Smoke (And Loud, Loud Music)"	20	16	Time Stood Still
1985	"I Know the Way to You by Heart"	35	27	Time Stood Still
1986	"It's Only Love Again"	68	—	Time Stood Still
1986	"Was It Just the Wine"	61	—	Time Stood Still
1986	"Time Stood Still"	51	—	Time Stood Still
1987	"Do You Believe Me Now"	4	13	Chiseled in Stone
1988	"Set 'Em Up Joe"	1	2	Chiseled in Stone
1988	"Chiseled in Stone"	6	3	Chiseled in Stone
1989	"Who You Gonna Blame It On This Time"	2	1	Chiseled in Stone
1989	"I'm Still Crazy"	1	1	Alone
1989	"That Just About Does It"	4	3	Alone
1990	"Right in the Wrong Direction"	10	6	Alone
1990	"Tanqueray"	75	65	Alone
1990	"This Ain't My First Rodeo"	14	19	10 Years of Greatest Hits – Newly Recorded
1990	"Is It Raining at Your House"	10	8	10 Years of Greatest Hits – Newly Recorded
1991	"I Knew My Day Would Come"	64	—	Out of My Heart
1991	"The Garden"	51	—	Out of My Heart
1991	"A Month of Sundays"	54	71	Out of My Heart
1993	"Back When"	67	—	Nickels and Dimes and Love
"—" denotes releases that did not chart

== Music videos ==
Year	Title	Director
1989	"That Just About Does It"	Deaton-Flanigen Productions
1991	"The Garden"	Marius Penczner
1991	"A Month of Sundays"	Michael Merriman

== See also ==
- The Hillmen

== Notes ==
- A There Is a Season also peaked at number 4 on the RPM Country Albums chart in Canada.
- B If Jesus Comes Tomorrow (What Then) was re-released on June 20, 1995 by Key Brothers Entertainment as The Gospel Album.
