= 10 Years of Greatest Hits – Newly Recorded =

10 Years of Hits – Newly Recorded

Studio album by Vern Gosdin
- Released: August 14, 1990
- Genre: Country
- Length: 34:21
- Label: Columbia
- Producer: Bob Montgomery

Vern Gosdin chronology
Alone (1989)	10 Years of Hits – Newly Recorded (1990)	Out of My Heart (1991)

Professional ratings
Review scores
Source	Rating
Allmusic	4/5 stars

10 Years of Hits – Newly Recorded is the twelfth studio album by American country music artist Vern Gosdin. It was released in 1990 via Columbia Records. The album peaked at number 21 on the Billboard Top Country Albums chart.

== Track listing ==
No.	Title	Writer(s)	Length
1.	"If You're Gonna Do Me Wrong (Do It Right)"	Max D. Barnes, Vern Gosdin	3:28
2.	"Slow Burning Memory"	Max D. Barnes, V. Gosdin	3:06
3.	"This Ain't My First Rodeo"	Max D. Barnes, Hank Cochran, V. Gosdin	3:06
4.	"Today My World Slipped Away"	V. Gosdin, Mark Wright	3:12
5.	"Way Down Deep"	Max D. Barnes, Max T. Barnes	2:46
6.	"Is It Raining at Your House"	Cochran, Dean Dillon, V. Gosdin	2:59
7.	"Friday Night Feeling"	Richard Landers	3:02
8.	"Till the End"	Cathy Gosdin	2:52
9.	"I Can Tell By the Way You Dance (You're Gonna Love Me Tonight)"	Sandy Pinkard, Robb Strandlund	2:46
10.	"Time Stood Still"	Robert Jones	3:31
11.	"Was It Just the Wine"	Cannon, V. Gosdin	3:12

== Personnel ==
- Mark Casstevens - acoustic guitar
- Carol Chase - background vocals
- Linda Davis - background vocals
- Vern Gosdin - lead vocals, background vocals
- Jerry Kroon - drums
- Brent Mason - electric guitar
- Tim Mensy - electric guitar
- Ron Oates - keyboards
- Billy Sanford - electric guitar
- Lisa Silver - background vocals
- Ricky Skaggs - background vocals
- Jim Vest - steel guitar
- Bergen White - background vocals
- Dennis Wilson - background vocals
- Lonnie Wilson - drums
- Bob Wray - bass guitar

== Charts ==
=== Weekly charts ===
Chart (1990)	Peak position
US Top Country Albums (Billboard)	21

=== Year-end charts ===
Chart (1991)	Position
US Top Country Albums (Billboard)	50

== Certifications ==
Region	Certification	Certified units/sales
United States (RIAA)	Gold	500,000^{^}
^{^} Shipments figures based on certification alone.
