= A Month of Sundays =

A Month of Sundays may refer to:

== Literature ==
- A Month of Sundays (novel), part of the Scarlet Letter trilogy by John Updike
- A Month of Sundays, a novel by Diane Farr

== Film, theatre, and television ==
- A Month of Sundays (2001 film), 2001 film starring Rod Steiger
- A Month of Sundays (2015 film), 2015 Australian film
- A Month of Sundays (miniseries), 1981 Canadian film anthology miniseries
- A Month of Sundays (play), comedy by Bob Larbey, later adapted by Larbey as the 1989 television movie Age-Old Friends
- "A Month of Sundays", second-season episode of the American television series Route 66
- A Month of Sundays, play by Romeo Muller

== Music ==
Albums and EPs

- A Month of Sundays, 1993 album by Canadian folk rock band Jimmy George
- A Month of Sundays, 1996 solo album from Tony Hooper, best known as member of the Strawbs
- A Month of Sundays, 2019 album by American duo Epignosis

Songs

- "A Month of Sundays", 1984 single by Scottish pop band The Questions
- "A Month of Sundays", 1991 song and music video by Vern Gosdin
- "A Month of Sundays", 1984 song by Don Henley from Building the Perfect Beast
- "A Month of Sundays", 1984 song by The Church from Remote Luxury
- "A Month of Sundays", 2010 song by Sick of it All from Based on a True Story
- "A Month of Sundays", 2003 song by Roses are Red from Handshakes and Heartbreaks

== Other uses ==
- A Month of Sundays, an art gallery by English artist Pete McKee
