= Country Music Association Award for Song of the Year =

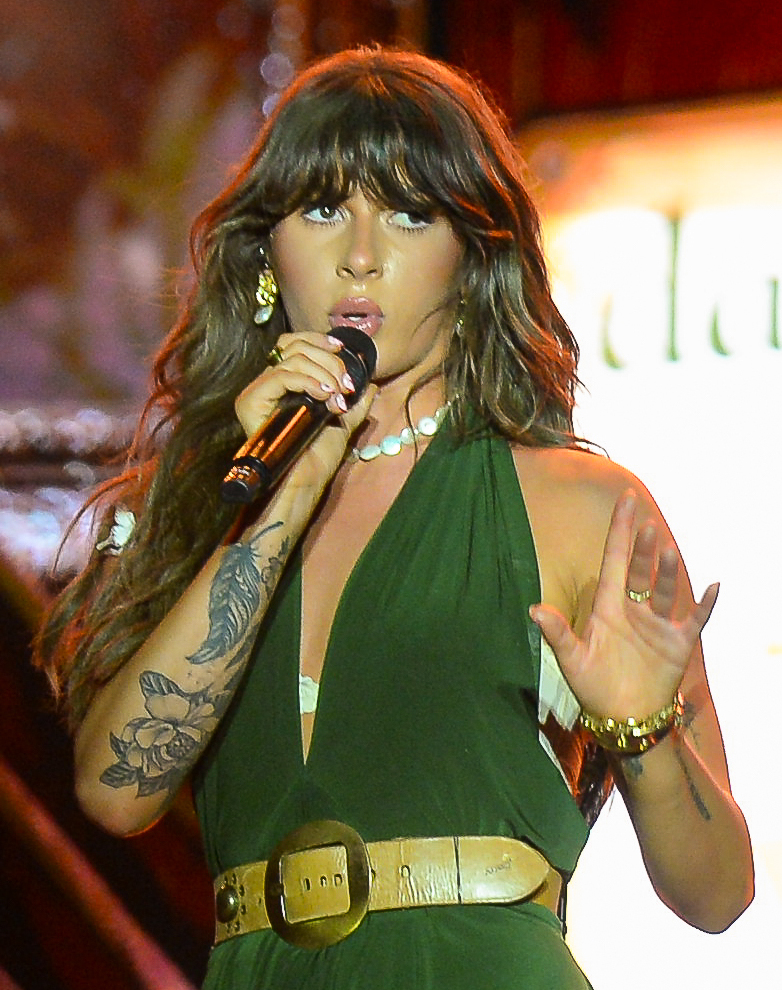
- Current winner of the award Ella Langley
- Country: United States
- Presented by: Country Music Association
- First award: 1967
- Currently held by: Ella Langley, Luke Dick, Miranda Lambert & Joybeth Taylor (2026)

The following list shows the recipients of the Country Music Association Award for Song of the Year. This Award goes to the songwriter(s) and is for artistic achievement in songwriting. Any Country Music song with original words and music is eligible based upon the song's Country singles chart activity during the eligibility period. It is the sister category to the Country Music Association Award for Single of the Year, which recognizes the artist, producer and engineer.

It was first handed out at the inaugural 1967 CMA Awards to Dallas Frazier for his song "There Goes My Everything" which had been popularised at that time by Jack Greene. K. T. Oslin became the first woman to win the award in 1988 for her hit "80's Ladies". Vince Gill is the most awarded songwriter in the category, with four wins, while two—time winner Alan Jackson and 2014 recipient Shane McAnally hold the record for most nominations, with ten each. Bob McDill and Brad Paisley are the most nominated writers not to win, with six nominations. The current holder of the award is Chris Stapleton and Dan Wilson, who wrote Stapleton's hit "White Horse", which won at the 58th Annual Country Music Association Awards in 2024.

To date, thirteen men: Dallas Frazier (1967), Bobby Russell (1968), Bob Ferguson (1969), Kris Kristofferson (1970), Freddie Hart (1971—2), Kenny O'Dell (1973), Don Wayne (1974), John Denver (1975), Larry Weiss (1976), Richard Leigh (1978), Don Schlitz (1979), Lee Greenwood (1985) and Vince Gill (1996) and seven women: K.T. Oslin (1988), Gretchen Peters (1995), Jennifer Nettles (2008), Kimberly Perry (2011), Lori McKenna (2016), Taylor Swift (2017) and Tracy Chapman (2023) have won the Song of the Year award with a solo composition.

To date, only three songs, "Easy Loving", "Always on My Mind" and "He Stopped Loving Her Today", have received the award in consecutive years and only Freddie Hart, Don Schlitz, Vince Gill and Lori McKenna have won in consecutive years.

== Recipient ==
=== 2020s ===
Year	Songwriter(s)	Title	Nominees
2026	Ella Langley; Luke Dick; Miranda Lambert; Joybeth Taylor	“Choosin’ Texas”	“Be Her” — Ella Langley, Smith Ahnquist, Michael Hardy, Jordan Schmidt; "Beautiful Things” — Megan Moroney, Jessi Alexander, Jessie Jo Dillon, Connie Harrington; “Dry Spell” — Kacey Musgraves, Luke Laird, Shane McAnally, Josh Osborne; "Gary” — Stephen Wilson Jr.
2025	Ella Langley; Riley Green; Aaron Raitiere	"You Look Like You Love Me"	“4x4xU” — Jon Decious, Aaron Raitiere, Lainey Wilson; “Am I Okay?” — Megan Moroney, Jessie Jo Dillon, Luke Laird; “I Never Lie” — Carson Chamberlain, Tim Nichols, Zach Top; “Texas” — Johnny Clawson, Josh Dorr, Kyle Sturrock, Lalo Guzman
2024	Chris Stapleton; Dan Wilson	"White Horse"	“Burn It Down” — Hillary Lindsey, Parker McCollum, Lori McKenna and Liz Rose; “Dirt Cheap — Josh Phillips; “I Had Some Help” — Louis Bell, Ashley Gorley, Charlie Handsome, Jonathan Hoskins, Post Malone, Ernest Keith Smith, Morgan Wallen and Chandler Paul Walters; "“The Painter” — Benjy Davis, Kat Higgins, Ryan Larkins
2023	Tracy Chapman	"Fast Car"	"Heart Like a Truck" — Trannie Anderson, Dallas Wilson, Lainey Wilson; "Next Thing You Know" — Jordan Davis, Greylan James, Chase McGill, Josh Osborne; "Tennessee Orange" — David Fanning, Paul Jenkins, Megan Moroney, Ben Williams; "Wait in the Truck" — Renee Blair, Michael Hardy, Hunter Phelps, Jordan Schmidt
2022	Jacob Davis; Jordan Davis; Josh Jenkins; Matt Jenkins	"Buy Dirt"	"Never Wanted to Be That Girl" — Shane McAnally, Ashley McBryde, Carly Pearce; "Sand in My Boots" — Ashley Gorley, Michael Hardy, Josh Osborne; "Things a Man Oughta Know" — Jason Nix, Jonathan Singleton, Lainey Wilson; "You Should Probably Leave" — Chris DuBois, Ashley Gorley, Chris Stapleton
2021	Mike Henderson; Chris Stapleton	"Starting Over"	"Forever After All" — Luke Combs, Drew Parker, Robert Williford; "The Good Ones" — Gabby Barrett, Zach Kale, Emily Landis and Jim McCormick; "Hell of A View" — Casey Beathard, Eric Church, Monty Criswell; "One Night Standards" — Nicolette Hayford, Shane McAnally, Ashley McBryde
2020	Maren Morris; Jimmy Robbins; Laura Veltz	"The Bones"	"Bluebird" — Luke Dick, Natalie Hemby, Miranda Lambert; "Even Though I'm Leaving" — Luke Combs, Wyatt Durrette, Ray Fulcher; "I Hope You're Happy Now" — Luke Combs, Randy Montana, Carly Pearce, Jonathan Singleton; "More Hearts Than Mine" — Ingrid Andress, Sam Ellis, Derrick Southerland

=== 2010s ===
Year	Songwriter(s)	Title	Nominees
2019	Luke Combs; Wyatt Durrette; Robert Williford	"Beautiful Crazy"	"Girl" — Maren Morris, Sarah Aarons and Greg Kurstin; "God's Country" — Devin Dawson, Jordan Schmidt and Michael Hardy; "Rainbow" — Natalie Hemby, Shane McAnally and Kacey Musgraves; "Tequila" — Dan Smyers, Nicolle Galyon and Jordan Reynolds
2018	Mike Henderson; Chris Stapleton	"Broken Halos"	"Body Like a Back Road" — Zach Crowell, Sam Hunt, Shane McAnally and Josh Osborne; "Drowns the Whiskey" — Brandon Kinney, Jeff Middleton and Josh Thompson; "Drunk Girl" — Scooter Carusoe, Tom Douglas and Chris Janson; "Tequila" — Dan Smyers, Nicolle Galyon and Jordan Reynold
2017	Taylor Swift	"Better Man"	"Blue Ain't Your Color" — Hillary Lindsey, Steven Lee Olsen and Clint Lagerberg; "Body Like a Back Road" — Zach Crowell, Sam Hunt, Shane McAnally and Josh Osborne; "Dirt on My Boots" — Rhett Akins, Jesse Frasure and Ashley Gorley; "Tin Man" — Jack Ingram, Miranda Lambert, Jon Randall
2016	Lori McKenna	"Humble and Kind"	"Burning House" — Jeff Bhasker, Cam and Tyler Johnson; "Die a Happy Man" — Sean Douglas, Thomas Rhett and Joe Spargur; "My Church" — Busbee and Maren Morris; "Record Year" — Eric Church and Jeff Hyde
2015	Hillary Lindsey; Lori McKenna; Liz Rose	"Girl Crush"	"American Kids" — Rodney Clawson, Luke Laird and Shane McAnally; "Like a Cowboy" — Randy Houser and Brice Long; "Like a Wrecking Ball" — Eric Church and Casey Beathard; "Take Your Time" — Sam Hunt, Shane McAnally and Josh Osborne
2014	Brandy Clark; Shane McAnally; Kacey Musgraves	"Follow Your Arrow"	"Automatic" — Nicolle Galyon, Miranda Lambert and Hillary Lindsey; "Give Me Back My Hometown" — Eric Church and Luke Laird; "I Don't Dance" — Lee Brice, Dallas Davidson and Rob Hatch; "I Hold On" — Dierks Bentley and Brett James
2013	Jessi Alexander; Connie Harrington; Jimmy Yeary	"I Drive Your Truck"	"Mama's Broken Heart" — Brandy Clark, Shane McAnally and Kacey Musgraves; "Merry Go 'Round" — Shane McAnally, Kacey Musgraves and Josh Osborne; "Pontoon" — Barry Dean, Natalie Hemby and Luke Laird; "Wagon Wheel" — Bob Dylan and Ketch Secor
2012	Miranda Lambert; Blake Shelton	"Over You"	"Even If It Breaks Your Heart" — Will Hoge and Eric Paslay; "God Gave Me You" — Dave Barnes; "Home" — Brett Beavers, Dierks Bentley and Dan Wilson; "Springsteen" — Eric Church, Jeff Hyde and Ryan Tyndell
2011	Kimberly Perry	"If I Die Young"	"Colder Weather" — Coy Bowles, Zac Brown, Wyatt Durrette, Levi Lowrey; "Dirt Road Anthem" — Colt Ford and Brantley Gilbert; "Mean" — Taylor Swift; "You and Tequila" — Matraca Berg and Deana Carter
2010	Tom Douglas; Allen Shamblin	"The House That Built Me"	"A Little More Country Than That" — Rory Feek, Don Poythress and Wynn Varble; "Need You Now" — Dave Haywood, Josh Kear, Charles Kelley and Hillary Scott; "Toes" — Zac Brown, Wyatt Durrette, John Hopkins and Shawn Mullins; "White Liar" — Natalie Hemby and Miranda Lambert

=== 2000s ===
Year	Songwriter(s)	Title	Nominees
2009	Jamey Johnson; Lee Thomas Miller; James Otto	"In Color"	"Chicken Fried" — Zac Brown and Wyatt Durrette; "I Told You So" — Randy Travis; "People Are Crazy" — Bobby Braddock and Troy Jones; "Then" — Chris DuBois, Ashley Gorley and Brad Paisley
2008	Jennifer Nettles	"Stay"	"Good Time" — Alan Jackson; "I Saw God Today" — Rodney Clawson, Monty Criswell and Wade Kirby; "Letter to Me" — Brad Paisley; "You're Gonna Miss This" — Ashley Gorley and Lee Thomas Miller
2007	Bill Anderson; Buddy Cannon; Jamey Johnson	"Give It Away"	"Anyway" — Martina McBride, Brad and Brett Warren; "Before He Cheats" — Josh Kear and Chris Tompkins; "Lost in This Moment" — Keith Anderson, Rodney Clawson and John Rich; "Stupid Boy" — Dave Berg, Deanna Bryant and Sarah Buxton
2006	Ronnie Dunn Craig Wiseman	"Believe"	"8th of November" — Big Kenny and John Rich; "Jesus, Take the Wheel" — Brett James, Hillary Lindsey and Gordie Sampson; "Tonight I Wanna Cry" — Monty Powell and Keith Urban; "When I Get Where I'm Going" — George Teren and Rivers Rutherford
2005	Bill Anderson; Jon Randall	"Whiskey Lullaby"	"Alcohol" — Brad Paisley; "As Good as I Once Was" — Sonny Emerick and Toby Keith; "Bless the Broken Road" — Bobby Boyd, Jeff Hanna and Marcus Hummon; "I May Hate Myself in the Morning" — Odie Blackman; "Redneck Woman" — John Rich and Gretchen Wilson
2004	Tim Nichols; Craig Wiseman	"Live Like You Were Dying"	"Long Black Train" — Josh Turner; "Redneck Woman" — John Rich and Gretchen Wilson; "Remember When" — Alan Jackson; "Whiskey Lullaby" — Bill Anderson and Jon Randall
2003	Doug Johnson; Kim Williams	"Three Wooden Crosses"	"Beer for My Horses" — Scotty Emerick and Toby Keith; "Celebrity" — Brad Paisley; "Have You Forgotten?" — Wynn Varble and Darryl Worley; "Red Dirt Road" — Kix Brooks and Ronnie Dunn
2002	Alan Jackson	"Where Were You (When the World Stopped Turning)"	"Courtesy of the Red, White and Blue (The Angry American)" — Toby Keith; "Drive (For Daddy Gene)" — Alan Jackson; "Man of Constant Sorrow" — Carter Stanley; "I'm Gonna Miss Her (The Fishin' Song)" — Brad Paisley and Frank Rogers
2001	Larry Cordle; Larry Shell	"Murder on Music Row"	"Born to Fly" — Sara Evans, Marcus Hummon and Darrell Scott; "How Do You Like Me Now?!" — Chuck Cannon and Toby Keith; "I'm Already There" — Gary Baker, Frank J. Myers and Richie McDonald; "One More Day" — Steven Dale Jones and Bobby Tomberlin
2000	Mark D. Sanders; Tia Sillers	"I Hope You Dance"	"Amazed" — Marv Green, Chris Lindsey and Aimee Mayo; "Breathe" — Stephanie Bentley and Holly Lamar; "He Didn't Have to Be" — Kelley Lovelace and Brad Paisley; "Murder on Music Row" — Larry Cordle and Larry Shell

=== 1990s ===
Year	Songwriter(s)	Title	Nominees
1999	Beth Nielsen Chapman; Robin Lerner; Annie Roboff	"This Kiss"	"Don't Laugh at Me" — Steve Seskin and Allen Shamblin; "Husbands and Wives" — Roger Miller; "If You Ever Have Forever in Mind" — Vince Gill and Troy Seals; "Please Remember Me" — Rodney Crowell and Will Jennings
1998	Billy Kirsch; Steve Wariner	"Holes in the Floor of Heaven"	"A Broken Wing" — James House, Phil Barnhart and Sam Hogin; "How Do I Live" — Diane Warren; "I Just Want to Dance with You" — Roger Cook and John Prine; "It's Your Love" — Stephony Smith
1997	Matraca Berg; Gary Harrison	"Strawberry Wine"	"All the Good Ones Are Gone" — Dean Dillon and Bob McGill; "Blue" — Bill Mack; "Butterfly Kisses" — Bob Carlisle and Randy Thomas; "Time Marches On" — Bobby Braddock
1996	Vince Gill	"Go Rest High on That Mountain"	"Any Man of Mine" — Robert John "Mutt" Lange and Shania Twain; "Check Yes or No" — Dana Hunt and Danny Wells; "The Keeper of the Stars" — Dickey Lee, Danny Mayo and Karen Staley; "Time Marches On" — Bobby Braddock
1995	Gretchen Peters	"Independence Day"	"Don't Take the Girl" — Larry Johnson and Craig Martin; "Gone Country" — Bob McDill; "How Can I Help You Say Goodbye" — Burton Banks Collins and Karen Taylor—Good; "Thinkin' Problem" — David Ball, Allen Shamblin and Stuart Ziff
1994	Jim McBride; Alan Jackson	"Chattahoochee"	"Don't Take the Girl" — Larry Johnson and Craig Martin; "He Thinks He'll Keep Her" — Mary Chapin Carpenter and Don Schlitz; "I Swear" — Gary Baker and Frank J. Myers; "Little Rock" — Tom Douglas
1993	Vince Gill; John Barlow Jarvis	"I Still Believe in You"	"Ain't That Lonely Yet" — James House and Kostas Lazarides; "Boot Scootin' Boogie" — Ronnie Dunn; "Chattahoochee" — Jim McBride and Alan Jackson; "Seminole Wind" — John Anderson
1992	Max D. Barnes; Vince Gill	"Look at Us"	"Achy Breaky Heart" — Don Von Tress; "Don't Rock the Jukebox" — Alan Jackson, Keith Stegall and Roger Murrah; "Down at the Twist and Shout" — Mary Chapin Carpenter; "Love, Me" — Max T. Barnes and Skip Ewing
1991	Tim DuBois; Vince Gill	"When I Call Your Name"	"Don't Rock the Jukebox" — Alan Jackson, Keith Stegall and Roger Murrah; "Friends in Low Places" — Dewayne Blackwell and Earl Bud Lee; "Here in the Real World" — Mark Irwin and Alan Jackson; "The Dance" — Tony Arata
1990	Don Henry; Jon Vezner	"Where've You Been"	"Here in the Real World" — Mark Irwin and Alan Jackson; "If Tomorrow Never Comes" — Garth Brooks and Kent Blazy; "Killin' Time" — Clint Black and Hayden Nicholas; "When I Call Your Name" — Tim DuBois and Vince Gill

=== 1980s ===
Year	Songwriter(s)	Title	Nominees
1989	Max D. Barnes; Vern Gosdin	"Chiseled in Stone"	"A Better Man" — Clint Black and Hayden Nicholas; "After All This Time" — Rodney Crowell; "Don't Close Your Eyes" — Bob McDill; "Eighteen Wheels and a Dozen Roses" — Gene Nelson and Paul Nelson
1988	K. T. Oslin	"80's Ladies"	"Do Ya" — K. T. Oslin; "Eighteen Wheels and a Dozen Roses" — Gene Nelson and Paul Nelson; "I Told You So" — Randy Travis; "Life Turned Her That Way" — Harlan Howard
1987	Paul Overstreet; Don Schlitz	"Forever and Ever, Amen"	"All My Ex's Live in Texas" — Linda Shafer and Sanger Shafer; "Can't Stop My Heart from Loving You" — Kieran Kane and Jamie O'Hara; "Daddy's Hands" — Holly Dunn; "On the Other Hand" — Paul Overstreet and Don Schlitz
1986	Paul Overstreet; Don Schlitz	"On the Other Hand"	"1982" — Buddy Blackmon and Vip Vipperman; "Bop" — Paul Davis and Jennifer Kimball; "Grandpa (Tell Me 'Bout the Good Ol' Days)" — Jamie O'Hara; "Lost in the Fifties Tonight (In the Still of the Night)" — Mike Reid, Troy Seals and Fred Parris
1985	Lee Greenwood	"God Bless the U.S.A."	"Baby's Got Her Blue Jeans On" — Bob McDill; "Does Fort Worth Ever Cross Your Mind" —Darlene Shafer and Sanger Shafer; "Mama He's Crazy" — Kenny O'Dell; "Seven Spanish Angels" — Eddie Setser and Troy Seals
1984	Larry Henley; Jeff Silbar	"The Wind Beneath My Wings"	"A Little Good News" — Charlie Black, Rory Bourke and Tommy Rocco; "God Bless the U.S.A." — Lee Greenwood; "Islands in the Stream" — Barry Gibb, Robin Gibb and Maurice Gibb; "To All the Girls I've Loved Before" — Hal David and Albert Hammond
1983	Wayne Carson; Johnny Christopher; Mark James	"Always on My Mind"	"16th Avenue" — Thom Schuyler; "I.O.U." — Kerry Chater and Austin Roberts; "If You're Gonna Do Me Wrong (Do It Right)" — Max Barnes and Vern Gosdin; "Swingin'" — John Anderson and Lionel Delmore
1982	Wayne Carson; Johnny Christopher; Mark James	"Always on My Mind"	"Elvira" — Dallas Frazier; "I'm Gonna Hire a Wino to Decorate Our Home" — Dewayne Blackwell; "It Turns Me Inside Out" — Jan Crutchfield; "You're the Reason God Made Oklahoma" — Larry Collins and Sandy Pinkard
1981	Bobby Braddock; Curly Putman	"He Stopped Loving Her Today"	"Elvira" — Dallas Frazier; "I Believe in You" — Roger Cook and Sam Hogin; "I Was Country When Country Wasn't Cool" — Kye Fleming and Dennis Morgan; "I'm Just an Old Chunk of Coal (But I'm Gonna Be a Diamond Someday)" — Billy Joe Shaver
1980	Bobby Braddock; Curly Putman	"He Stopped Loving Her Today"	"Coward of the County" — Roger Bowling and Billy Edd Wheeler; "Good Ole Boys Like Me" — Bob McDill; "In America" — Tom Crain, William DiGregorio, Charlie Daniels, Fred Edwards, Charles Hayward and James Marshall; "You Decorated My Life" — Debbie Hupp and Bob Morrison

=== 1970s ===
Year	Songwriter(s)	Title	Nominees
1979	Don Schlitz	"The Gambler"	"Amanda" — Bob McDill; "Every Which Way but Loose" — Milton Brown, Stephen Dorff and Thomas Garrett; "She Believes in Me" — Steve Gibb; "Talking in Your Sleep" — Roger Cook and Bobby Wood
1978	Richard Leigh	"Don't It Make My Brown Eyes Blue"	"Heaven's Just a Sin Away" — Jerry Gillespie; "It Was Almost Like a Song" — Hal David and Archie Jordan; "Mammas Don't Let Your Babies Grow Up to Be Cowboys" — Ed Bruce and Patsy Bruce; "Take This Job and Shove It" — David Allan Coe
1977	Roger Bowling; Hal Bynum	"Lucille"	"(I'm A) Stand by My Woman Man" — Kent Robbins; "It Was Almost Like a Song" — Hal David and Archie Jordan; "Luckenbach, Texas (Back to the Basics of Love)" — Bobby Emmons and Chips Moman; "Southern Nights" — Allen Toussaint
1976	Larry Weiss	"Rhinestone Cowboy"	"I'll Get Over You" — Richard Leigh; "The Blind Man in the Bleachers" — Sterling Whipple; "The Door Is Always Open" — Dickey Lee and Bob McDill; "'Til I Can Make It on My Own" — George Richey, Billy Sherrill and Tammy Wynette
1975	John Denver	"Back Home Again"	"Before the Next Teardrop Falls" — Vivian Keith and Ben Peters; "(Hey Won't You Play) Another Somebody Done Somebody Wrong Song" — Larry Bulter and Chips Moman; "I'm Not Lisa" — Jessi Colter; "Rainy Day Woman" — Waylon Jennings
1974	Don Wayne	"Country Bumpkin"	"If We Make It Through December" — Merle Haggard; "If You Love Me (Let Me Know)" — John Rostill; "The Most Beautiful Girl" — Rory Bourke, Billy Sherrill and Norro Wilson; "The Streak" — Ray Stevens
1973	Kenny O'Dell	"Behind Closed Doors"	"It's Not Love (But It's Not Bad)" — Hank Cochran and Glenn Martin; "(Old Dogs, Children and) Watermelon Wine" — Tom T. Hall; "Satin Sheets" — John Volinkaty; "Why Me" — Kris Kristofferson
1972	Freddie Hart	"Easy Loving"	"Kiss an Angel Good Mornin'" — Ben Peters; "She's All I Got" — Gary Bonds and Jerry Williams; "The Happiest Girl in the Whole U.S.A." — Donna Fargo; "To Get to You" — Jean Chapel
1971	Freddie Hart	"Easy Loving"	"Coal Miner's Daughter" — Loretta Lynn; "The Year Clayton Delaney Died" — Tom T. Hall; "Put Your Hand in the Hand" — Gene MacLellan; "When You're Hot, You're Hot" — Jerry Reed
1970	Kris Kristofferson	"Sunday Mornin' Comin' Down"	"The Fightin' Side of Me" — Merle Haggard; "Hello Darlin'" — Conway Twitty; "My Woman, My Woman, My Wife" — Marty Robbins; "Okie from Muskogee" — Merle Haggard

=== 1960s ===
Year	Songwriter(s)	Title	Nominees
1969	Bob Ferguson	"The Carroll County Accident"	"Daddy Sang Bass" — Carl Perkins; "Stand by Your Man" — Billy Sherrill and Tammy Wynette; "When the Grass Grows Over Me" — Don Chapel; "Darling, You Know I Wouldn't Lie" — Wayne Kemp
1968	Bobby Russell	"Honey"	"D—I—V—O—R—C—E" — Bobby Braddock and Curly Putman; "Harper Valley PTA" — Tom T. Hall; "Little Green Apples" — Bobby Russell; "Skip a Rope" — Jack Moran and Glenn Douglas Tubb
1967	Dallas Frazier	"There Goes My Everything"	"All The Time" — Mel Tillis and Wayne Walker; "It's Such a Pretty World Today" — Dale Noe; "My Elusive Dreams" — Curly Putman and Billy Sherrill; "Ode to Billie Joe" — Bobbie Gentry

== Writers with multiple wins ==
Songwriters that received multiple awards
Awards	Artist
4	Vince Gill
3	Don Schlitz
2	Bill Anderson
2	Chris Stapleton
2	Freddie Hart
2	Lori McKenna
2	Mike Henderson
2	Paul Overstreet
2	Miranda Lambert
2	Ella Langley

== Writers with multiple nominations ==
11 nominations

- Shane McAnally

10 nominations

- Alan Jackson

7 nominations

- Bob McDill
- Josh Osborne

6 nominations

- Bob McDill
- Bobby Braddock
- Brad Paisley
- Vince Gill
- Miranda Lambert

5 nominations

- Ashley Gorley
- Don Schlitz
- Eric Church
- Kacey Musgraves
- Hillary Lindsey
- Wyatt Durrette

4 nominations

- Billy Sherrill
- Curly Putman
- John Rich
- Luke Combs
- Natalie Hemby
- Toby Keith
- Michael Hardy
- Luke Laird

3 nominations

- Allen Shamblin
- Bill Anderson
- Dallas Frazier
- Ella Langley
- Merle Haggard
- Megan Moroney
- Hal David
- Jon Randall
- Jordan Schmidt
- Maren Morris
- Nicolle Galyon
- Paul Overstreet
- Rodney Clawson
- Roger Cook
- Ronnie Dunn
- Sam Hunt
- Tom Douglas
- Tom T. Hall
- Troy Seals
- Zac Brown

2 nominations

- Archie Jordan
- Ashley McBryde
- Ben Peters
- Bobby Russell
- Brandy Clark
- Brett James
- Carly Pearce
- Casey Beathard
- Chips Moman
- Chris DuBois
- Clint Black
- Craig Martin
- Craig Wiseman
- Connie Harrington
- Dan Smyers
- Dewayne Blackwell
- Dickey Lee
- Dierks Bentley
- Frank J. Myers
- Freddie Hart
- Gary Baker
- Gene Nelson
- Gretchen Wilson
- Hayden Nicholas
- James House
- Jamey Johnson
- Jamie O'Hara
- Jeff Hyde
- Jessi Alexander
- Jessie Jo Dillon
- Jim McBride
- John Anderson
- Johnny Christopher
- Jonathan Singleton
- Jordan Davis
- Jordan Reynolds
- Josh Kear
- K. T. Oslin
- Keith Stegall
- Kenny O'Dell
- Kris Kristofferson
- Lainey Wilson
- Lee Thomas Miller
- Larry Cordle
- Larry Johnson
- Larry Shell
- Lee Greenwood
- Lori McKenna
- Luke Dick
- Marcus Hummon
- Mark Irwin
- Mark James
- Mary Chapin Carpenter
- Matraca Berg
- Max D. Barnes
- Monty Criswell
- Paul Nelson
- Randy Travis
- Richard Leigh
- Robert Williford
- Rodney Crowell
- Roger Bowling
- Roger Murrah
- Rory Bourke
- Sam Hogin
- Sanger Shafer
- Tammy Wynette
- Taylor Swift
- Tim DuBois
- Vern Gosdin
- Wayne Carson
- Wynn Varble
- Zach Crowell
