= That Just About Does It =

Single by Vern Gosdin

from the album Alone
- B-side: "Set 'Em Up Joe"
- Released: September 30, 1989
- Genre: Country
- Length: 4:00
- Label: Columbia
- Songwriters: Vern Gosdin, Max D. Barnes
- Producer: Bob Montgomery

Vern Gosdin singles chronology
"I'm Still Crazy" (1989)	"That Just About Does It" (1989)	"Right in the Wrong Direction" (1990)

"That Just About Does It" is a song co-written and recorded by American country music artist Vern Gosdin. It was released in September 1989 as the second single from the album Alone. The song reached #4 on the Billboard Hot Country Singles & Tracks chart. Gosdin wrote the song with Max D. Barnes

== Chart performance ==
Chart (1989–1990)	Peak position
Canada Country Singles (RPM)	3
US Hot Country Songs (Billboard)	4

=== Year-end charts ===
Chart (1990)	Position
Canada Country Tracks (RPM)	40
US Country Songs (Billboard)	52
