= 1983 Country Music Association Awards =

Annual US music awards ceremony

- Date: October 10, 1983
- Location: Grand Ole Opry House, Nashville, Tennessee
- Hosted by: Willie Nelson; Anne Murray
- Most wins: Alabama (3)
- Most nominations: Merle Haggard (6)

Television/radio coverage
- Network: CBS

The 1983 Country Music Association Awards, 17th Ceremony, was held on October 10, 1983, at the Grand Ole Opry House, Nashville, Tennessee, and was hosted by CMA Award winner Willie Nelson and artist Anne Murray.

== Winners and nominees ==
Winners in Bold.

Entertainer of the Year	Album of the Year
**Alabama**; Merle Haggard; Barbara Mandrell; Willie Nelson; Ricky Skaggs	**The Closer You Get... — Alabama**; Highways and Heartaches — Ricky Skaggs; It Ain't Easy — Janie Fricke; Pancho and Lefty — Willie Nelson and Merle Haggard; Wild and Blue — John Anderson
Male Vocalist of the Year	Female Vocalist of the Year
**Lee Greenwood**; John Anderson; Merle Haggard; Willie Nelson; Ricky Skaggs	**Janie Fricke**; Lacy J. Dalton; Emmylou Harris; Barbara Mandrell; Reba McEntire
Vocal Group of the Year	Vocal Duo of the Year
**Alabama**; Bellamy Brothers; Oak Ridge Boys; Statler Brothers; The Whites	**Willie Nelson and Merle Haggard**; David Frizzell and Shelly West; Don Williams and Emmylou Harris; Eddie Rabbitt and Crystal Gayle; George Jones and Merle Haggard
Single of the Year	Song of the Year
**"Swingin'" — John Anderson**; "Heartbroke" — Ricky Skaggs; "I Always Get Lucky With You" — George Jones; "I.O.U." — Lee Greenwood; "Pancho And Lefty" — Willie Nelson and Merle Haggard	**"Always On My Mind" — Johnny Christopher, Wayne Carson, Mark James**; "16th Avenue" — Thom Schuyler; "I.O.U." — Lee Greenwood; "If You're Gonna Do Me Wrong (Do It Right)" — Vern Gosdin and Max D. Barnes; "Swingin'" — John Anderson and Lionel Delmore
Horizon Award	Instrumentalist of the Year
**John Anderson**; Vern Gosdin; Reba McEntire; George Strait; The Whites	**Chet Atkins**; Johnny Gimble; Charlie McCoy; Hargus "Pig" Robbins; Buddy Spicher
Instrumental Group of the Year
**Ricky Skaggs Band**; Alabama; Charlie Daniels Band; Nitty Gritty Dirt Band; Oak Ridge Boys Band

== Hall of Fame ==
Country Music Hall of Fame Inductees
- Little Jimmy Dickens
