= A Night to Remember =

A Night to Remember may refer to:

== Film, literature, and television ==
- A Night to Remember (1942 film), an American mystery comedy starring Loretta Young and Brian Aherne
- A Night to Remember (book), 1955, by Walter Lord about the sinking of the RMS Titanic
  - A Night to Remember (Kraft Television Theatre), a 1956 live television performance on NBC
  - A Night to Remember (1958 film), a British adaptation of Lord's book, directed by Roy Ward Baker
- "A Night to Remember" (Doctors), a 2005 television episode
- "A Night to Remember" (Mad Men), a 2008 television episode
- "A Night to Remember" (The Raccoons), a 1985 television episode
- "Chapter Thirty-One: A Night to Remember", a 2018 episode of Riverdale

== Music ==
=== Albums and DVDs ===
- A Night to Remember: Pop Meets Classic, a 2003 concert DVD by Sarah Connor
- A Night to Remember (Joe Diffie album) (1999)
- A Night to Remember (Evergrey album) (2005)
- A Night to Remember (Cyndi Lauper album) (1989)
- A Night to Remember (Johnny Mathis album) (2008)
- A Night to Remember (Shonlock album) (2014)

=== Songs ===
- "A Night to Remember" (Joe Diffie song) (1999)
- "A Night to Remember" (High School Musical song), a 2008 song from the film High School Musical 3: Senior Year
- "A Night to Remember" (Cyndi Lauper song) (1989)
- "A Night to Remember" (Shalamar song), a 1982 song later covered by 911 and Liberty X
- "A Night to Remember" (U96 song) (1996)
- "A Night to Remember" (Beabadoobee and Laufey song) (2023)
- "A Night to Remember", by Girl in Red from I'm Doing It Again Baby! (2024)
