= Alone (Vern Gosdin album) =

Studio album by Vern Gosdin
- Released: June 19, 1989
- Studio: The Bennett House, Franklin, TN Sony Tree Studios, Nashville TN
- Genre: Country
- Length: 33:52
- Label: Columbia
- Producer: Bob Montgomery

Vern Gosdin chronology
| Chiseled in Stone (1988) | Alone (1989) | 10 Years of Greatest Hits – Newly Recorded (1990) |

Singles from Alone
- 1. "I'm Still Crazy" Released: May 1989; 2. "That Just About Does It" Released: September 30, 1989; 3. "Right in the Wrong Direction" Released: February 3, 1990

Professional ratings
Review scores
| Source | Rating |
|---|---|
| Allmusic | 3/5 stars |

Alone is the eleventh studio album by American country music artist Vern Gosdin. It was released in 1989 via Columbia Records. The album peaked at number 11 on the Billboard Top Country Albums chart.

== Track listing ==
| No. | Title | Writer(s) | Length |
|---|---|---|---|
| 1. | "That Just About Does It" | Max D. Barnes, Vern Gosdin | 3:59 |
| 2. | "Take Me Home to Alabama" | Hank Cochran, V. Gosdin, Mack Vickery | 3:44 |
| 3. | "I'm Still Crazy" | Buddy Cannon, V. Gosdin, Steve Gosdin | 2:46 |
| 4. | "Paradise '83" | Mike Baker, Cannon, V. Gosdin | 3:26 |
| 5. | "Do Me a Favor" | Cannon, Cochran, V. Gosdin | 3:11 |
| 6. | "Tanqueray" | Cochran, V. Gosdin, Jim Vest, Vickery | 3:01 |
| 7. | "Alone" | Barnes | 4:40 |
| 8. | "Right in the Wrong Direction" | Cochran, V. Gosdin, Vickery | 2:13 |
| 9. | "I'm Only Going Crazy" | Barnes, V. Gosdin | 3:27 |
| 10. | "You're Not by Yourself" | Cannon, Cochran, V. Gosdin | 3:25 |

== Personnel ==
- Vern Gosdin - lead vocals
- Bill Hullett - acoustic guitar
- Roy Huskey Jr. - upright bass
- Jerry Kroon - drums
- Tim Mensy - acoustic guitar
- Ron Oates - keyboards
- Tom Robb - bass guitar
- Billy Sanford - electric guitar
- Mike Severs - electric guitar
- Jim Vest - steel guitar
- Bob Wray - bass guitar

== Charts ==
=== Weekly charts ===
| Chart (1989–1990) | Peak position |
|---|---|
| US Top Country Albums (Billboard) | 11 |

=== Year-end charts ===
| Chart (1989) | Position |
|---|---|
| US Top Country Albums (Billboard) | 66 |
| Chart (1990) | Position |
| US Top Country Albums (Billboard) | 21 |
