= Refulgence =

Refulgence may refer to:

- Refulgence, 2011 album by Epignosis
- Divine refulgence
