= This Ain't My First Rodeo =

Single by Vern Gosdin

from the album 10 Years of Greatest Hits
- B-side: "If You're Gonna Do Me Wrong (Do It Right)"
- Released: July 23, 1990
- Genre: Country
- Length: 3:04
- Label: Columbia
- Songwriters: Vern Gosdin, Hank Cochran, Max D. Barnes
- Producer: Bob Montgomery

Vern Gosdin singles chronology
"Tanqueray" (1990)	"This Ain't My First Rodeo" (1990)	"Is It Raining at Your House" (1991)

"This Ain't My First Rodeo" is a song co-written and recorded by American country music artist Vern Gosdin. It was released in July 1990 as the lead single from his compilation album 10 Years of Greatest Hits. Gosdin wrote the song with Hank Cochran and Max D. Barnes.

== Background ==
Gosdin credited the genesis of the song to a workman who used the idiomatic expression which became the song's title:

"I was wanting an addition put on my house, an extra room over my garage. I met with the carpenters one morning, then left my house and drove to Nashville for the day. When I got home, they had almost finished the addition. I complimented them on their work, and one guy said, 'This ain't our first rodeo.' I went into the house and jotted that down, then wrote the song later with Hank [Cochran] and Max [D. Barnes]."

== Content ==
The lyrics explain a tale of experience, including these repeated lines:

This ain't the first time this old cowboy's been throwed
This ain't the first I've seen this dog and pony show
Honey, This ain't my first rodeo

== Chart performance ==
The song was number 10 in Radio and Records during the week of November 26, 1990. It reached number 14 on Hot Country Songs.

Chart (1990)	Peak position
Canada Country Singles (RPM)	19
US Hot Country Songs (Billboard)	14
