= Time Stood Still =

Time Stood Still may refer to:

== Film ==
- Time Stood Still (film), a 1956 American travelogue
- Time Stood Still, a 1959 film by Ermanno Olmi

== Music ==
- Time Stood Still, an album by Vern Gosdin, 1985
- "Time Stood Still", a song by Bad English from Backlash, 1991
- "Time Stood Still", a song by Madonna from The Next Best Thing film soundtrack, 2000
- "Time Stood Still", a song by Somesh Mathur
- "Time Stood Still", a song by Todd Rundgren from No World Order, 1993

== See also ==
- Time Stands Still (disambiguation)
- "When Time Stood Still", a song by Electric Light Orchestra from the B-side of the single "Hold On Tight", 1981
- Where Time Stood Still, a 1988 isometric action-adventure video game
