= Do You Believe Me Now (Vern Gosdin song) =

Single by Vern Gosdin

from the album Chiseled in Stone
- B-side: "Nobody Calls from Vegas Just to Say Hello"
- Released: November 7, 1987
- Genre: Country
- Length: 3:35
- Label: Columbia
- Songwriter(s): Vern Gosdin, Max D. Barnes
- Producer(s): Bob Montgomery

Vern Gosdin singles chronology
"Time Stood Still" (1986)	"Do You Believe Me Now" (1987)	"Set 'Em Up Joe" (1988)

"Do You Believe Me Now" is a song co-written and recorded by American country music artist Vern Gosdin. It was released in November 1987 as the first single from the album Chiseled in Stone. The song reached #4 on the Billboard Hot Country Singles & Tracks chart. Gosdin wrote the song with Max D. Barnes.

== Charts ==
=== Weekly charts ===
Chart (1987–1988)	Peak position
US Hot Country Songs (Billboard)	4
Canadian RPM Country Tracks	13

=== Year-end charts ===
Chart (1988)	Position
US Hot Country Songs (Billboard)	69
