= Who You Gonna Blame It On This Time =

Single by Vern Gosdin

from the album Chiseled in Stone
- B-side: "It's Not Over Yet"
- Released: January 7, 1989
- Genre: Country
- Length: 2:49
- Label: Columbia
- Songwriter(s): Vern Gosdin, Hank Cochran
- Producer(s): Bob Montgomery

Vern Gosdin singles chronology
"Chiseled in Stone" (1988)	"Who You Gonna Blame It On This Time" (1989)	"I'm Still Crazy" (1989)

"Who You Gonna Blame It On This Time" is a song co-written and recorded by American country music artist Vern Gosdin. It was released in January 1989 as the fourth single from the album Chiseled in Stone. The song reached #2 on the Billboard Hot Country Singles & Tracks chart. Gosdin wrote the song with Hank Cochran.

== Chart performance ==
Chart (1989)	Peak position
US Hot Country Songs (Billboard)	2
Canadian RPM Country Tracks	1

=== Year-end charts ===
Chart (1989)	Position
Canada Country Tracks (RPM)	40
US Country Songs (Billboard)	38
