= The Quittin' Kind =

Single by Joe Diffie

from the album A Night to Remember
- B-side: "Don't Our Love Look Natural"
- Released: September 4, 1999
- Genre: Country
- Length: 3:26
- Label: Epic
- Songwriter(s): Phil Barnhart, Sam Hogin, Mark D. Sanders
- Producer(s): Don Cook, Lonnie Wilson

Joe Diffie singles chronology
"A Night to Remember" (1999)	"The Quittin' Kind" (1999)	"It's Always Somethin'" (2000)

"The Quittin' Kind" is a song recorded by American country music artist Joe Diffie. It was released in September 1999 as the second single from the album A Night to Remember. The song reached #21 on the Billboard Hot Country Singles & Tracks chart. The song was written by Phil Barnhart, Sam Hogin and Mark D. Sanders.

== Chart performance ==
Chart (1999)	Peak position
US Bubbling Under Hot 100 Singles (Billboard)	90
US Hot Country Songs (Billboard)	21
Canadian RPM Country Tracks	40
