= A Night to Remember (Joe Diffie album) =

Studio album by Joe Diffie
- Released: June 1, 1999
- Studios: SoundShop Studio A&B
- Genre: Country
- Length: 34:34
- Label: Epic
- Producers: Don Cook; Lonnie Wilson

Joe Diffie chronology
Greatest Hits (1998)	A Night to Remember (1999)	In Another World (2001)

Singles from A Night to Remember
- 1. "A Night to Remember" Released: March 9, 1999; 2. "The Quittin' Kind" Released: September 4, 1999; 3. "It's Always Somethin'" Released: February 21, 2000

Professional ratings
Review scores
Source	Rating
Allmusic	link

A Night to Remember is the eighth studio album by American country music artist Joe Diffie. It was released on June 1, 1999, through Epic Records, and was also Diffie’s last album released through that label. The album contains the singles "A Night to Remember", "The Quittin' Kind", and "It's Always Somethin'", which respectively reached #6, #21, and #5 on the Billboard country charts. The title track was also Diffie's highest entry on the Billboard Hot 100, reaching #38 there. The song "I'm the Only Thing (I'll Hold Against You)" was originally recorded by Conway Twitty on his Final Touches album. "Don't Our Love Look Natural" was originally recorded by Keith Whitley.

== Track listing ==
No.	Title	Writer(s)	Length
1.	"A Night to Remember"	Max T. Barnes, T. W. Hale	3:30
2.	"You Can't Go Home"	Joe Diffie, Zack Turner, Lonnie Wilson	3:40
3.	"I'm the Only Thing (I'll Hold Against You)"	Diffie, Wilson, Kim Williams	4:12
4.	"The Quittin' Kind"	Mark D. Sanders, Sam Hogin, Phil Barnhart	3:26
5.	"Better Off Gone"	Turner, Wilson	3:15
6.	"It's Always Somethin'"	Aimee Mayo, Marv Green	2:58
7.	"Are We Even Yet"	Diffie, Turner, Wilson	3:31
8.	"My Heart's In Over My Head"	Diffie, Tim Mensy	3:04
9.	"Not in This Lifetime"	Bob DiPiero, Steve Diamond	3:24
10.	"Don't Our Love Look Natural"	Don Cook, Harlan Howard	3:34

== Personnel ==
- Sam Bush – mandolin
- Mark Casstevens – acoustic guitar
- Joe Diffie – lead vocals, background vocals
- Larry Franklin – fiddle
- Paul Franklin – steel guitar
- David Hungate – bass guitar
- John Barlow Jarvis – piano, Hammond B-3 organ, Wurlitzer
- Tim Lauer – Hammond B-3 organ, keyboards
- Liana Manis – background vocals
- Brent Mason – electric guitar, gut string guitar, tic tac bass
- Steve Nathan – piano, keyboards, Hammond B-3 organ
- Tom Roady – percussion
- Brent Rowan – electric guitar
- Lonnie Wilson – drums, percussion, background vocals
- Glenn Worf – bass guitar

== Chart performance ==
Chart (1999)	Peak position
U.S. Billboard Top Country Albums	23
U.S. Billboard 200	189
Canadian RPM Country Albums	25
