= Is It Raining at Your House =

Single by Vern Gosdin

from the album 10 Years of Greatest Hits
- B-side: "Today My World Slipped Away"
- Released: December 1990
- Genre: Country
- Length: 2:59
- Label: Columbia
- Songwriters: Vern Gosdin, Dean Dillon, Hank Cochran
- Producer: Bob Montgomery

Vern Gosdin singles chronology
"This Ain't My First Rodeo" (1990)	"Is It Raining at Your House" (1990)	"I Know My Day Will Come" (1991)

"Is It Raining at Your House" is a song co-written and recorded by American country music artist Vern Gosdin. It was released in December 1990 as the second single from his compilation album 10 Years of Greatest Hits, but originally appeared on his 1987 album Chiseled in Stone. The song reached number 10 on the Billboard Hot Country Singles & Tracks chart; it was Gosdin's last top 10 and top 40 single on the country charts. Gosdin wrote the song with Dean Dillon and Hank Cochran.

== Content ==
The song is in the key of D major. The first verse follows the chord pattern of D-F♯m/C♯m-G/B-A-D twice, followed by D-F♯m-G/B-Gm/B♭-D-Bm-D/A-G-G/A-D. After this single verse is a bridge following the chord pattern Bm-F♯-Gm6. In the song, a male narrator asks his former lover if it is "raining at [her] house".

== Chart performance ==
Chart (1990–1991)	Peak position
Canada Country Singles (RPM)	8
US Hot Country Songs (Billboard)	10

=== Year-end charts ===
Chart (1991)	Position
Canada Country Tracks (RPM)	86

== Cover versions ==
- Jamey Johnson covered the song on his 2002 self-released album They Call Me Country.
- Brad Paisley covered the song on his 2003 album Mud on the Tires.
- Lorrie Morgan covered the song on her 2016 album Letting Go...Slow. Morgan's cover features sound effects of rain and thunder fading into the song's beginning, and again fading out at the song's end.
