= Time Stands Still =

Time Stands Still or Time Stand Still may refer to:

== Theatre, film and television ==
- Time Stands Still (play), a 2009 play by Donald Margulies
- Time Stands Still (film), a 1982 Hungarian film
- "Time Stands Still" (Degrassi: The Next Generation), a 2004 two-part TV episode

== Music ==
=== Albums ===
- Time Stand Still (album), by the Hooters, or the title song, 2007
- Time Stand Still: The Collection, by Rush, 2010
- Time Stands Still (Chris Smither album) or the title song, 2009
- Time Stands Still (Family Force 5 album) or the title song, 2014
- Time Stands Still (Unleash the Archers album) or the title song, 2015
- Time Stands Still, by Emma Kirkby, 1986

=== Songs and compositions ===
- "Time Stand Still" (song), by Rush, 1987
- "Time Stands Still", written by John Dowland, 1603
- "Time Stands Still" (The All-American Rejects song), 2003
- "Time Stands Still", by DJ Quik featuring Dwele from The Book of David, 2011
- "Time Stands Still", by Gary Lewis & the Playboys from Everybody Loves a Clown, 1965
- "Time Stands Still", by Meredith MacRae, 1964
- "Time Stands Still (at the Iron Hill)", by Blind Guardian from Nightfall in Middle-Earth, 1998

== See also ==
- Time Stood Still (disambiguation)
