= Right in the Wrong Direction =

Single by Vern Gosdin

from the album Alone
- B-side: "Tanqueray"
- Released: February 3, 1990
- Genre: Country
- Length: 2:14
- Label: Columbia
- Songwriters: Vern Gosdin, Hank Cochran, Mack Vickery
- Producer: Bob Montgomery

Vern Gosdin singles chronology
""That Just About Does It" (1989)"	"Right in the Wrong Direction" (1990)	"Tanqueray" (1990)

"Right in the Wrong Direction" is a song co-written and recorded by American country music artist Vern Gosdin. It was released in February 1990 as the third single from the album Alone. The song reached #10 on the Billboard Hot Country Singles & Tracks chart. Gosdin wrote the song with Hank Cochran and Mack Vickery.

== Chart performance ==
Chart (1990)	Peak position
Canada Country Singles (RPM)	6
US Hot Country Songs (Billboard)	10

=== Year-end charts ===
Chart (1990)	Position
Canada Country Tracks (RPM)	84
