= It's Always Somethin' =

Single by Joe Diffie

from the album A Night to Remember
- Released: February 21, 2000
- Recorded: 1999
- Genre: Country
- Length: 2:58
- Label: Epic
- Songwriters: Marv Green; Aimee Mayo
- Producers: Don Cook; Lonnie Wilson

Joe Diffie singles chronology
"The Quittin' Kind" (1999)	"It's Always Somethin'" (2000)	"In Another World" (2001)

"It's Always Somethin'" is a song written by Aimee Mayo and Marv Green, and recorded by American country music artist Joe Diffie. It was released in February 2000 as the third single from his album A Night to Remember. It peaked at number 5 on the U.S. Billboard Hot Country Singles & Tracks chart and number 11 on the Canadian RPM Country Tracks chart.

== Music video ==
The music video is a live performance, directed by Jon Small. It is the last music video of his career.

== Chart positions ==
"It's Always Somethin'" debuted at number 66 on the U.S. Billboard Hot Country Singles & Tracks for the week of February 12, 2000.

Chart (2000)	Peak position
Canada Country Singles (RPM)	11
US Billboard Hot 100	57
US Hot Country Songs (Billboard)	5

=== Year-end charts ===
Chart (2000)	Position
US Country Songs (Billboard)	23
