= What Would Your Memories Do =

Single by Vern Gosdin

from the album There Is a Season
- B-side: "Love Me Right to the End"
- Released: July 1984
- Genre: Country
- Length: 2:48
- Label: Compleat
- Songwriter(s): Hank Cochran; Dean Dillon
- Producer(s): Blake Mevis

Vern Gosdin singles chronology
"I Can Tell by the Way You Dance (You're Gonna Love Me Tonight)" (1984)	"What Would Your Memories Do" (1984)	"Slow Burning Memory" (1984)

"What Would Your Memories Do" is a song written by Dean Dillon and Hank Cochran, and recorded by American country music artist Vern Gosdin. It was released in July 1984 as the second single from his album There Is a Season. The song peaked at number 10 on the Billboard Hot Country Singles chart.

An unreleased version of the song was recorded by George Strait in the 1980s. The version was later included in the 1995 box-set, Strait Out of the Box.

== Chart performance ==
Chart (1984)	Peak position
US Hot Country Songs (Billboard)	10
Canadian RPM Country Tracks	9
