= Chiseled in Stone (album) =

Studio album by Vern Gosdin
- Released: January 15, 1988
- Recorded: 1987
- Studio: Sony Tree Studios; Sound Shop (Nashville, Tennessee)
- Genre: Country
- Length: 31:44
- Label: Columbia
- Producer: Bob Montgomery

Vern Gosdin chronology
Greatest Hits (1986)	Chiseled in Stone (1988)	Alone (1989)

Singles from Alone
- 1. "Do You Believe Me Now" Released: November 7, 1987; 2. "Set 'Em Up Joe" Released: April 1988; 3. "Chiseled in Stone" Released: August 27, 1988; 4. "Who You Gonna Blame It On This Time" Released: January 7, 1989

Professional ratings
Review scores
Source	Rating
Allmusic	5/5 stars

Chiseled in Stone is the tenth studio album by American country music artist Vern Gosdin. It was released in 1988 via Columbia Records. The album peaked at number 7 on the Billboard Top Country Albums chart.

== Track listing ==
No.	Title	Writer(s)	Length
1.	"Do You Believe Me Now"	Max D. Barnes, Vern Gosdin	3:37
2.	"Tight as Twin Fiddles"	Hank Cochran, Dean Dillon	2:04
3.	"Is It Raining at Your House"	Cochran, Dillon, Gosdin	3:00
4.	"Set 'Em Up Joe"	Buddy Cannon, Cochran, Dillon, Gosdin	2:26
5.	"There Ain't Nothing Wrong (Just Ain't Nothing Right)"	Cochran, Dillon, Gosdin	4:32
6.	"Chiseled in Stone"	Barnes, Gosdin	3:51
7.	"Who You Gonna Blame It On This Time"	Cochran, Gosdin	2:51
8.	"It's Not Over, Yet"	Cochran, Gosdin	3:59
9.	"Nobody Calls from Vegas Just to Say Hello"	Brenda Burch, Jimmy Burch, Cochran, Gosdin	2:28
10.	"I Guess I Had Your Leavin' Coming"	Cannon, Dillon, Gosdin	3:15

== Personnel ==
- Mark Casstevens - acoustic guitar
- Rodney Collins - background vocals
- Sonny Garrish - steel guitar
- Vern Gosdin - lead vocals, background vocals
- Hoot Hester - fiddle
- Jerry Kroon - drums
- Carol Montgomery - background vocals
- Ron Oates - keyboards
- Billy Sanford - electric guitar
- Jim Vest - steel guitar
- Dennis Wilson - background vocals
- Bob Wray - bass guitar
- Road Manager - Mike Adams
- Sound Engineer - Buck Jarrell

== Charts ==
=== Weekly charts ===
Chart (1988)	Peak position
US Top Country Albums (Billboard)	7

=== Year-end charts ===
Chart (1988)	Position
US Top Country Albums (Billboard)	19
Chart (1989)	Position
US Top Country Albums (Billboard)	22
Chart (1990)	Position
US Top Country Albums (Billboard)	74
