= 1989 Country Music Association Awards =

Annual US music awards ceremony

- Date: October 9, 1989
- Location: Grand Ole Opry House, Nashville, Tennessee
- Hosted by: Anne Murray; Kenny Rogers
- Most wins: Hank Williams Jr. Hank Williams Sr. (2 each)
- Most nominations: Hank Williams Jr. Ricky Van Shelton; Rodney Crowell (4 each)

Television/radio coverage
- Network: CBS

The 1989 Country Music Association Awards, 23rd Ceremony, was held on October 9, 1989, at the Grand Ole Opry House, Nashville, Tennessee, and was hosted by CMA Award Winners, Anne Murray and Kenny Rogers.

== Winners and nominees ==
Winner are in Bold.

Entertainer of the Year	Album of the Year
**George Strait**; Reba McEntire; Ricky Van Shelton; Randy Travis; Hank Williams, Jr.	**Will the Circle Be Unbroken Vol. II — Nitty Gritty Dirt Band**; Beyond the Blue Neon — George Strait; Loving Proof — Ricky Van Shelton; Old 8×10 — Randy Travis; Willow in the Wind — Kathy Mattea
Male Vocalist of the Year	Female Vocalist of the Year
**Ricky Van Shelton**; Rodney Crowell; George Strait; Randy Travis; Keith Whitley	**Kathy Mattea**; Rosanne Cash; Patty Loveless; Reba McEntire; Tanya Tucker
Vocal Group of the Year	Vocal Duo of the Year
**Highway 101**; Alabama; Desert Rose Band; Restless Heart; Shenandoah	**The Judds**; Baillie & The Boys; Bellamy Brothers; Foster & Lloyd; Sweethearts of the Rodeo
Single of the Year	Song of the Year
**"I'm No Stranger To The Rain" — Keith Whitley**; "A Better Man" — Clint Black; "After All This Time" — Rodney Crowell; "Chiseled in Stone" — Vern Gosdin; "I'll Leave This World Loving You" — Ricky Van Shelton	**"Chiseled in Stone" — Max D. Barnes and Vern Gosdin**; "A Better Man" — Clint Black and Hayden Nicholas; "After All This Time" — Rodney Crowell; "Don't Close Your Eyes" — Bob McDill; "Eighteen Wheels And A Dozen Roses" — Gene Nelson and Paul Nelson
Horizon Award	Musician of the Year
**Clint Black**; Desert Rose Band; Patty Loveless; Shenandoah; Keith Whitley	**Johnny Gimble**; Jerry Douglas; Paul Franklin; Mark O'Connor; Don Potter
Music Video of the Year	Vocal Event of the Year
**There's a Tear In My Beer — Hank Williams, Jr. and Hank Williams, Sr.**; After All This Time — Rodney Crowell; Dear Me — Lorrie Morgan; Why'd You Come In Here Lookin' Like That — Dolly Parton; Will the Circle Be Unbroken Vol. II — Nitty Gritty Dirt Band	**There's a Tear In My Beer — Hank Williams, Jr. and Hank Williams, Sr.**; Buck Owens and Ringo Starr; Hank Williams, Jr. and Johnny Cash; John Denver and Nitty Gritty Dirt Band; Johnny Cash, Rosanne Cash, The Everly Brothers

== Hall of Fame ==
Country Music Hall of Fame Inductees
- Jack Stapp
- Cliffie Stone
- Hank Thompson
