= I Wonder Where We'd Be Tonight =

Single by Vern Gosdin

from the album If You're Gonna Do Me Wrong (Do It Right)
- B-side: "I Feel Love Closin' In"
- Released: October 1, 1983
- Genre: Country
- Length: 3:35
- Label: Compleat
- Songwriter(s): Vern Gosdin, Jim Sales
- Producer(s): Blake Mevis

Vern Gosdin singles chronology
"Way Down Deep" (1983)	"I Wonder Where We'd Be Tonight" (1983)	"I Can Tell by the Way You Dance (You're Gonna Love Me Tonight)" (1984)

"I Wonder Where We'd Be Tonight" is a song co-written and recorded by American country music artist Vern Gosdin. It was released in October 1983 as the third single from the album If You're Gonna Do Me Wrong (Do It Right). The song reached #10 on the Billboard Hot Country Singles & Tracks chart. Gosdin wrote the song with Jim Sales.

== Chart performance ==
Chart (1983)	Peak position
US Hot Country Songs (Billboard)	10
Canadian RPM Country Tracks	10
