= Jimmy George (band) =

Canadian folk rock band

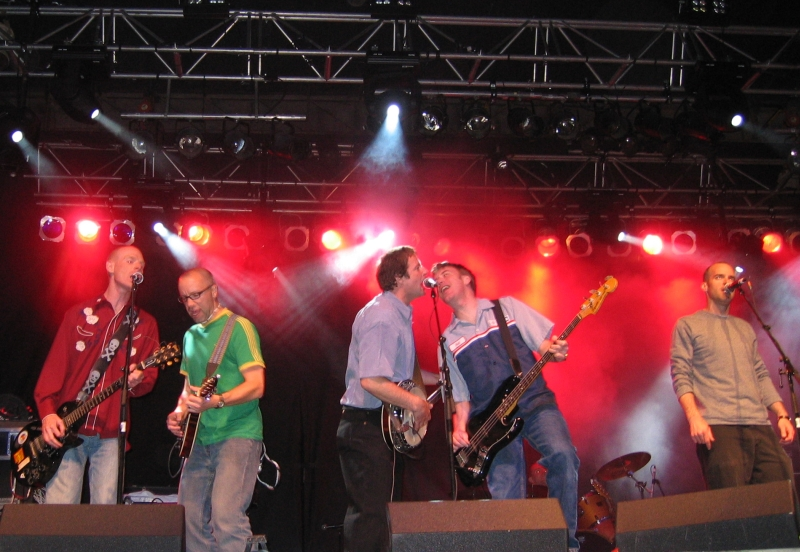
2002 Tulip Festival.

Jimmy George is a Canadian folk rock band from Ottawa, Canada, who combine Celtic folk with rock influences and formed in 1991.

== History ==
The line-up through the majority of the Duke of Somerset years, recording of both albums and all videos was Eric Altman (drums, management), Joel Carlson (mandolin), Michael Eady (fiddle), Steve Donnelly (bass), Jeff Kerr (banjo), Michael "Spike" Lawson (guitar), J Todd (main vocals, acoustic guitar), and Mickey Vallee (accordion). While Todd took the majority of singing duties, other members sang harmonies and most sang lead on a song or two. The original, short-lived lineup consisted of Michael Lawson (electric guitar), Joel Carlson (mandolin), Steve Barry (vocals), Duncan Gillis (acoustic guitar/penny whistle), Rob Porter (drums), Michael Eady (fiddle), and Colin Burns (bass).

At the end of their nine-year run as house band at the Duke of Somerset pub, the band consisted of J Todd, electric guitarist Steve Donnelly, bassist George Jennings, Joel Carlson on mandolin, Jeff Kerr on banjo, Mickey Vallee on accordion, and Tom Werbowetski on drums. Other members at various times included Christine Chesser (fiddle, vocals, 1991–1992), and Vitas Paukstitis (bass, 1991).

In 1993, the band was asked to open for Spirit of the West in Peterborough and at Carleton University's Porter Hall in Ottawa. Bill Stunt, producer of CBC Radio's All In A Day program, was at the show in Ottawa and approached the band afterwards, offering to record the band's material using funding from the CBC development budget. Recording took place over the next few months at Ottawa's Sound of One Hand studio, and the album A Month of Sundays was released on Montreal's now-defunct Cargo Records later that year, with national distribution by MCA Records. Two years later the band released their follow-up record Hotel Motel, produced by Marty Jones (Furnaceface), and recorded at Sound of One Hand and Raven Street Studios.

The band toured Canada twice and also played occasional shows in the United States. Most of the band also visited England and Ireland in July 1992, busking in the streets of London and Dublin including Temple Bar.

Jimmy George was the house band at the basement Duke of Somerset pub in downtown Ottawa for a nine-year period, playing every Sunday night and one Thursday-Saturday weekend a month, sometimes playing the "Duke" up to 10 times in a month, as well as other shows around town. They played over 500 shows at the pub which was usually packed with revellers, including several St. Patrick's Days and New Year's Eves.

As the Duke of Somerset underwent renovations and crowds thinned, the band ceased recording and playing, playing a "final" show in 1997. They played regular "reunion" shows in Ottawa to celebrate St. Patrick's Day or over the Christmas holidays for several years. In 2001, on the occasion of a reunion show at Barrymore's Music Hall in Ottawa, the band released the CD Same Sh!t Different Day, a collection of songs from their previous releases, plus some live recordings including the previously unreleased song "Where You Bleed". In April 2002, the band headlined Ottawa's Tulip Festival Concert Series and played a headline show at Ottawa's Barrymore's Music Hall.

On October 7, 2007, the former owners and staff of the Duke of Somerset pub organized a reunion event at local pub The Heart and Crown. Jimmy George played two sets with the line-up of J (vocals/acoustic guitar), Jeff (banjo), Mike (electric guitar), Joel (mandolin/bass), Rob (drums), Steve (bass/mandolin/accordion) and guest appearances by Angela McFall (Fairytale of New York), Madeleine Giguere (Rock and Roll Thing) on vocals, and Colin Burns on bass for a few songs.

On March 17, 2008, the band played a St. Patrick's Day show at Zaphod Beeblebrox in Ottawa. The lineup for this show consisted of J Todd (vocals, acoustic guitar), Joel Carlson (mandolin), Rob Porter (drums), Steve Donnelly (bass, electric guitar, accordion), and Colin Burns (bass on a few songs).

In December 2011, the band celebrated their 20th anniversary with 3 shows at Kaffe 1870 (Wakefield, Quebec) and Elmdale House Tavern (Ottawa, Ontario). Altman flew in from Japan and Vallee returned from Alberta for the occasion. The band played to capacity audiences for three nights; the second night featured all three drummers from the band's history, Altman, founding member Rob Porter and Tom Werbowetski. The band has since played occasional St. Patrick's Day shows at House of Targ in Ottawa. In 2018, the band also played the Grey Cup festivities in Ottawa in Aberdeen Pavilion at Lansdowne Park.

The members continue to perform in bands including Bible All-Stars (Carlson); The Kingmakers, Ray Harris, Sean Oliver, KJ Thomas bands (Donnelly); Mike McDonald Broadband (Vallee). Several of the band's songs have been performed by other bands, including "Breakfast With St. Swithin", which appeared on Vancouver band The Town Pants' CD. Other bands have performed the band's "Token Celtic Drinking Song". Their songs have been featured in several television programs including MTV Live, American Restoration, Toddlers and Tiaras, The Willis Family, Southbound, Still Standing, and Southie Rules.

== Television appearances ==
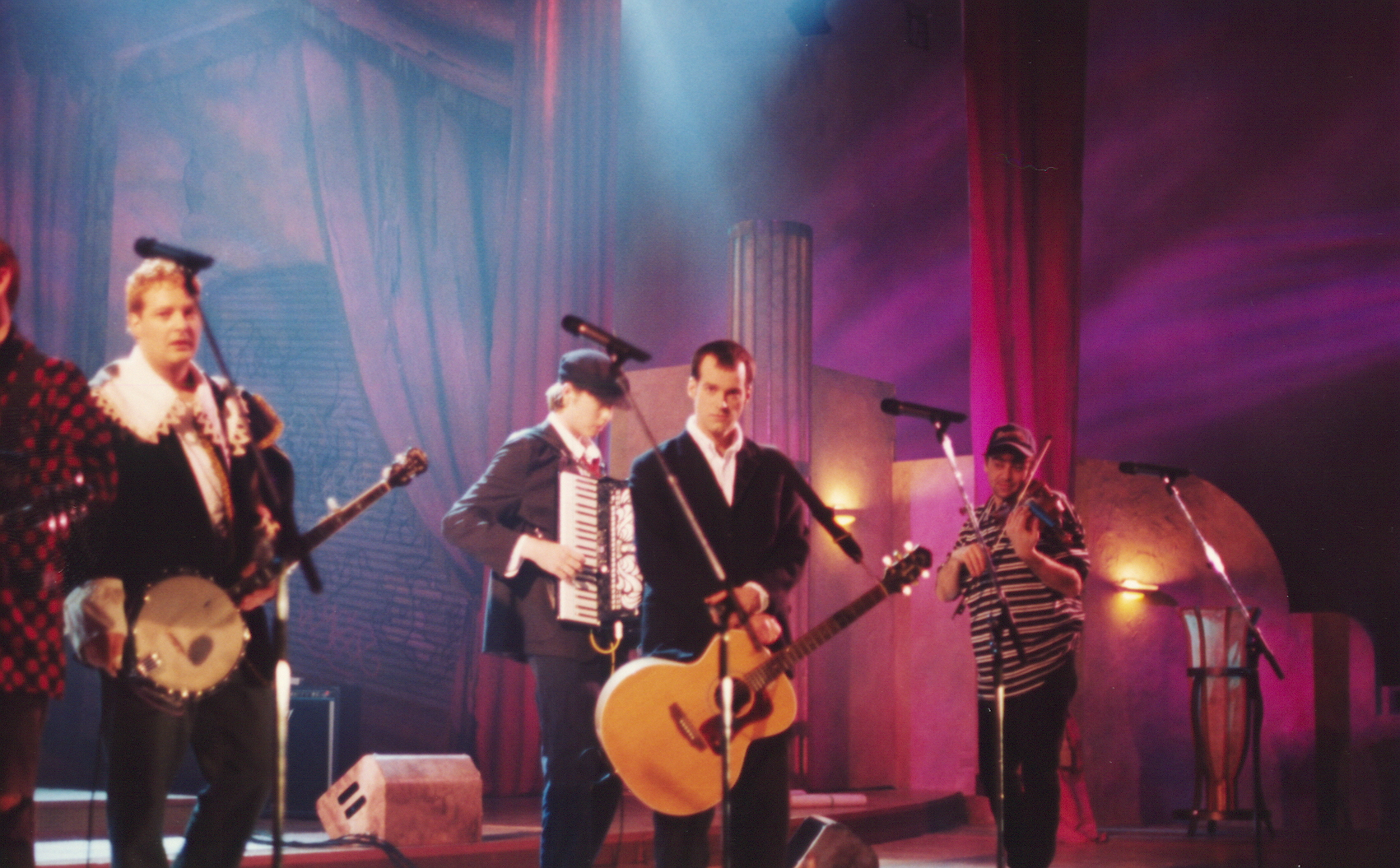
2005 Rita and Friends CBC TV

The band has made several TV appearances, including The Tom Green Show, Rita & Friends (CBC), and Lunch TV (CITY TV Toronto).

== Festivals ==
The band played at festivals including Northern Lights (Sudbury), Ottawa Folk Festival (Ottawa), Tulip Festival (Ottawa), Mariposa (Toronto), Music West (Vancouver), North By Northeast (NXNE) (Toronto), Canadian Music Week (Toronto), and Riverfest (Deep River).

== Videos ==
- One Convention (1995)
- Four Feet From Shore (1993)

== Discography ==
- A Month of Sundays (1993)
- Hotel Motel (1995)
- Same #$%! Different Day (2001)
