= Riverfest Elora =

Music festival in Ontario, Canada

- Genre: Music festival, Arts festival
- Dates: Second Weekend in September
- Locations: Elora, Ontario, Canada
- Years active: 2009-2019, 2021-2025
- Attendance: 15,000 (2023)
- Website: Official website

Riverfest Elora was an annual art and music held at Bissell Park in Elora, Ontario.

The festival was founded in 2009 by artist Marilyn Koop, initially as a backyard festival that was attended by 700 people with headliners Rawlins Cross and Tony McManus. In 2011 the festival moved from its original location on the grounds of the Elora Centre of the Arts across the street to its current home of Bissell Park.

The 2020 edition of the festival was cancelled due to COVID-19. In 2021, the festival was initially planned to run on a shrunken basis due to continuing COVID-19 requirements with only 430 tickets sold for a line up of 11 artists before being cancelled altogether.

Following the 2025 edition of the festival, it was announced that it would be continuing saying that it would not be continuing. A statement from the festival partners said that it had "turned only modest profits a handful of times in its 15-year history, and none in recent years” with losses of $1.2 million in the last three years.

== Notable headliners ==
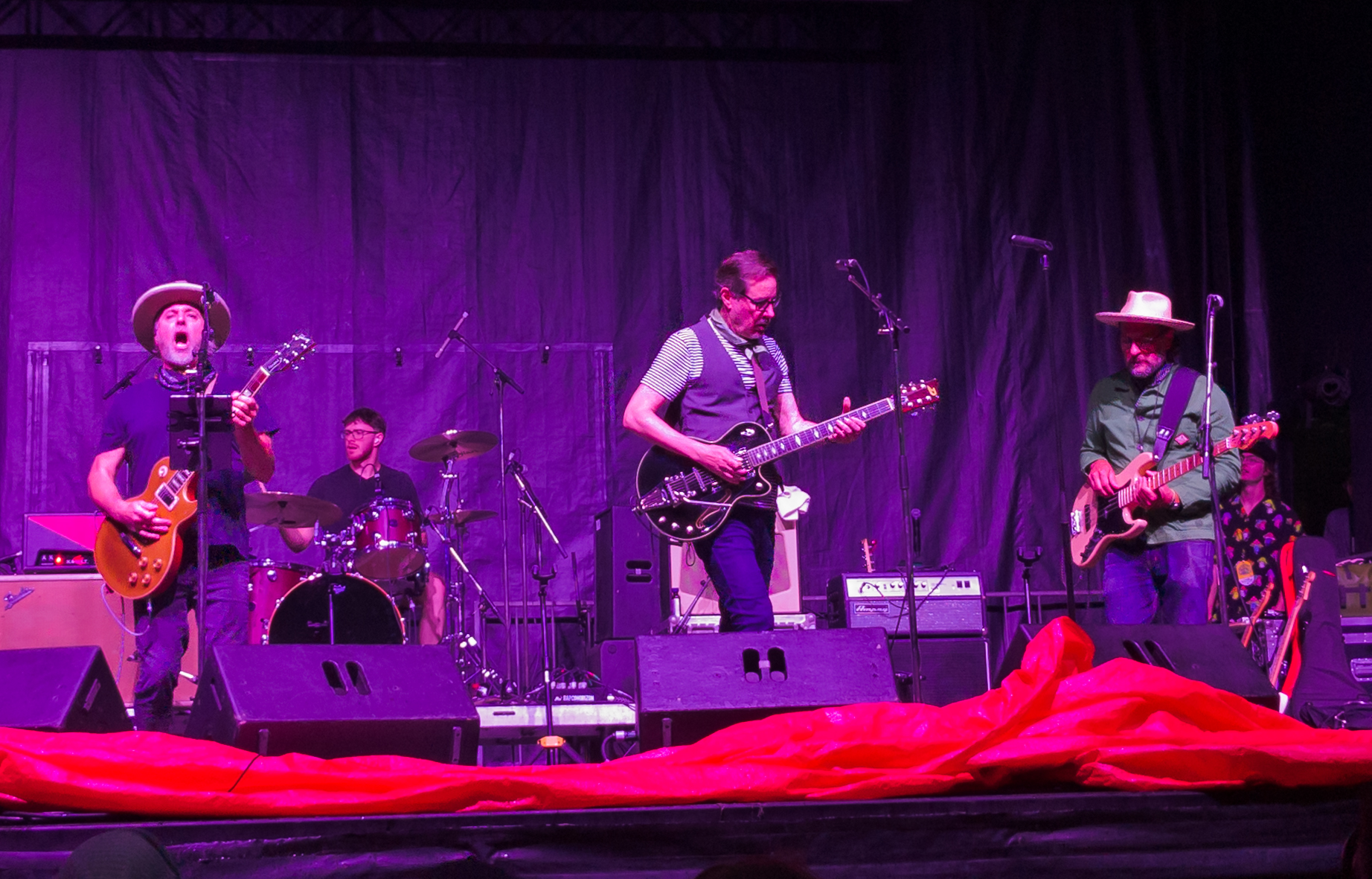
Treble Charger performing at Riverfest Elora 2024

- 2009 - Rawlins Cross, Tony McManus.
- 2010 - Prairie Oyster
- 2011 - Danny Michel, Kevin Breit
- 2012
- 2013 -Ashley MacIsaac, Born Ruffians, Rich Aucoin
- 2014 - Blue Rodeo, Charles Bradley and His Extraordinaires
- 2015 - Metric, Sam Roberts Band, Bruce Cockburn
- 2016 - Chromeo, the Sheepdogs, Hey Rosetta!
- 2017 - Monster Truck, MGMT, Gogol Bordello
- 2018 - The Flaming Lips, Blue Rodeo, July Talk
- 2019 - City and Colour, Jessie Reyez, The Mighty Mighty Bosstones
- 2022 - Alessia Cara, The Glorious Sons and Mother Mother
- 2023 - The Reklaws, Metric, and Feist
- 2024 - Violent Femmes, Fleet Foxes, Josh Ross
- 2025 - Silversun Pickups, Fitz and the Tantrums, City and Colour
