= I'm Still Crazy =

Single by Vern Gosdin

from the album Alone
- B-side: "Paradise '63
- Released: May 1989
- Recorded: 1988
- Genre: Country
- Length: 2:46
- Label: Columbia
- Songwriters: Buddy Cannon, Steve Gosdin, Vern Gosdin
- Producer: Bob Montgomery

Vern Gosdin singles chronology
"Who You Gonna Blame It on This Time" (1988)	"I'm Still Crazy" (1989)	"That Just About Does It" (1989)

"I'm Still Crazy" is a song co-written and recorded by American country music artist Vern Gosdin. It was released in May 1989 as the first single from the album Alone. The song was Gosdin's third and final number one on the country chart. The single went to number one for one week and spent a total of fourteen weeks on the country chart. Gosdin wrote the song with his son Steve and Buddy Cannon.

== Chart performance ==
Chart (1989)	Peak position
Canada Country Singles (RPM)	1
US Hot Country Songs (Billboard)	1

=== Year-end charts ===
Chart (1989)	Position
Canada Country Tracks (RPM)	79
US Country Songs (Billboard)	31
