= Hard Scratch, Iowa =

- Unincorporated community
- Location within Iowa Location within the United States
- Coordinates: 41°36′48″N 95°42′51″W
- Country: United States
- State: Iowa
- County: Harrison
- Elevation: 1,214 ft (370 m)
- Time zone: UTC-6 (CST)
  - Summer (DST): UTC-5 (CDT)
- GNIS feature ID: 457244

Hard Scratch is an unincorporated community within Harrison County, Iowa, United States.
