= A Night to Remember (Joe Diffie song) =

Single by Joe Diffie

from the album A Night to Remember
- B-side: "Don't Our Love Look Natural"
- Released: March 9, 1999
- Genre: Country
- Length: 3:30
- Label: Epic
- Songwriters: Max T. Barnes, T.W. Hale
- Producers: Don Cook, Lonnie Wilson

Joe Diffie singles chronology
"Poor Me" (1998)	"A Night to Remember" (1999)	"The Quittin' Kind" (1999)

"A Night to Remember" is a song written by Max T. Barnes and T.W. Hale, and recorded by American country music singer Joe Diffie. It was released in March 1999 as the first single and title track from his album A Night to Remember. The single peaked at number 6 on the U.S. Billboard Hot Country Singles & Tracks chart. The song also crossed over to the Top 40 on the Billboard Hot 100, where it peaked at number 38.

== Content ==
The song is a mid-tempo ballad in which the narrator tells of his "night to remember" a lost lover. He begins by stating that he has had a tough week, and has plans for tonight because he is feeling downcast.

In the second verse, he states how he feels that, because his woman was "so hard to lose", he has to do such a recollection of her, even though "sad ain't [his] style". According to Billboard.com, Diffie "conveys an element of hope among the ashes of a relationship that make this song a survivor."

== Music video ==
The music video for this song starts with Diffie singing and playing guitar in a forest, and also shows a man who is planning his "night to remember" in a dark house.

== Chart performance ==
The song debuted at number 59 on the Hot Country Singles & Tracks chart dated March 13, 1999. It charted for 29 weeks on that chart, peaking at number 6 on the chart dated July 17, 1999. In addition, it was a Top 40 hit on the Billboard Hot 100, peaking at number 38 on that chart, which is Diffie's only Top 40. In addition, it was ranked as the number 18 most-played song of 1999, according to Billboard.

Chart (1999)	Peak position
Canada Country Singles (RPM)	10
US Billboard Hot 100	38
US Hot Country Songs (Billboard)	6

=== Year-end charts ===
Chart (1999)	Position
Canada Country Tracks (RPM)	76
US Country Songs (Billboard)	18

== Parodies ==
Country music parodist Cledus T. Judd parodied this song on his album, Just Another Day in Parodies, under the title "A Night I Can't Remember."
