= Slow Burning Memory =

Single by Vern Gosdin

from the album There Is a Season
- B-side: "I've Got a Heart Full of You"
- Released: November 1984
- Genre: Country
- Length: 2:52
- Label: Compleat
- Songwriter(s): Max D. Barnes; Vern Gosdin
- Producer(s): Blake Mevis

Vern Gosdin singles chronology
"What Would Your Memories Do" (1984)	"Slow Burning Memory" (1984)	"Dim Lights, Thick Smoke (And Loud, Loud Music)" (1985)

"Slow Burning Memory" is a song co-written and recorded by American country music artist Vern Gosdin. It was released in November 1984 as the third single from his album There Is a Season. The song peaked at number 10 on the Billboard Hot Country Singles chart. Gosdin wrote the song with Max D. Barnes.

== Chart performance ==
Chart (1984–1985)	Peak position
US Hot Country Songs (Billboard)	10
Canadian RPM Country Tracks	7
