= A Month of Sundays (miniseries) =

Canadian television miniseries

- Presented by: Harry Brown
- Country of origin: Canada
- Original language: English
- No. of seasons: 1
- No. of episodes: 4

Production
- Running time: 180 minutes

Original release
- Network: CBC Television
- Release: 25 January – 15 February 1981

A Month of Sundays is a Canadian film anthology television miniseries that aired on CBC Television in 1981.

== Premise ==
Each episode consisted of various films according to a theme, as hosted by Harry Brown.

== Episodes ==
The films were presented during a three-hour time slot at 2:00 p.m. (Eastern) from 25 January to 15 February 1981.

1. 25 January 1981: Films on the theme of war were broadcast: the World War I drama "Bravery in the Field", the World War II documentary "For King And Country" (an excerpt from The Days Before Yesterday), "The Last Corvette" featuring HMCS Sackville and "Six War Years" by Barry Broadfoot which was previously developed for CBC's Performance series.
1. 1 February 1981: Films on women writers were featured, namely "Lucy Maud Montgomery: The Road to Green Gables", another documentary about the Anne of Green Gables musical itself, and "The Garden and the Cage" about Gabrielle Roy and Marie-Claire Blais.
1. 8 February 1981: This week's theme concerned flying. Snow geese were featured on "Flight of the Snows", aviation's history was featured on "Man Aloft", and "Whiskey Whiskey Papa" profiled various pilots.
1. 15 February 1981: Winter was the theme of the final programme including scenes from Winterlude in Ottawa and "The Dawson Patrol", a 1978 dramatization of an ill-fated 1910 Royal North-West Mounted Police journey towards Dawson City.
