= Epignosis =

- Origin: Raeford, North Carolina, United States
- Genres: Progressive rock
- Years active: 2008–present
- Labels: Bandcamp
- Members: Robert Brown; Tasha Nichole
- Website: Epignosis Bandcamp

Epignosis is a progressive rock band made up of multi-instrumentalist Robert Brown and vocalist Tasha Brown. The band's first studio album, Still the Waters, was released January 10, 2009. Two years later, the band released their second studio album, Refulgence, on June 17, 2011. The band name is of Greek origin, combining the preface epi-, meaning "toward", and gnosis, "knowledge".

== Background ==
Robert Brown was introduced to guitar by his father and grandfather, both of whom played the instrument. He taught himself how to play, at first playing along to Johnny Cash and other country albums. Eventually he discovered Kansas and Yes, which turned him onto progressive rock. From there he learned bass guitar and piano, and he began composing music that has appeared on both his studio albums. Epignosis' music is best described as symphonic rock, as it heavily relies on Hammond organ as well as Mellotron to make a minimalist and symphonic blend of progressive rock. The vocal style and instrumentation is very mellow and is reminiscent of bands such as Harmonium.

== Discography ==
- Still the Waters (2009)
- Refulgence (2011)
- A Month of Sundays (2019)

== Personnel ==
- Robert Brown – guitar, vocals, bass guitar, piano, Hammond organ, Mellotron, programming, production
- Tasha Brown – vocals
