= Set 'Em Up Joe =

Single by Vern Gosdin

from the album Chiseled in Stone
- B-side: "There Ain't Nothing Wrong (Just Ain't Nothing Right)"
- Released: April 1988
- Recorded: 1987
- Genre: Country
- Length: 2:26
- Label: Columbia
- Songwriter(s): Hank Cochran; Buddy Cannon; Dean Dillon; Vern Gosdin
- Producer(s): Bob Montgomery

Vern Gosdin singles chronology
"Do You Believe Me Now" (1987)	"Set 'Em Up Joe" (1988)	"Chiseled in Stone" (1988)

"Set 'Em Up Joe" is a song co-written and recorded by American country music artist Vern Gosdin. It was released in April 1988 as the second single from the album Chiseled in Stone. The song was Gosdin's second number one on the country chart. The single went to number one for one week and spent a total of 15 weeks in the top 40. Gosdin wrote the song with Dean Dillon, Buddy Cannon, and Hank Cochran.

== Content ==
The song was a tribute to country music legend Ernest Tubb. The narrator is bereft that his partner has left him, and takes to playing "Walking the Floor Over You" on the jukebox at the bar. The lyrics reference other famed country stars, such as Lefty Frizzell and Hank Williams Sr.

== Cover versions ==
The song was covered by Jamey Johnson on his 2010 album The Guitar Song.

== Charts ==
=== Weekly charts ===
Chart (1988)	Peak position
US Hot Country Songs (Billboard)	1
Canadian RPM Country Tracks	2

=== Year-end charts ===
Chart (1988)	Position
Canadian RPM Country Tracks	13
US Hot Country Songs (Billboard)	3
