= Max T. Barnes =

American singer-songwriter

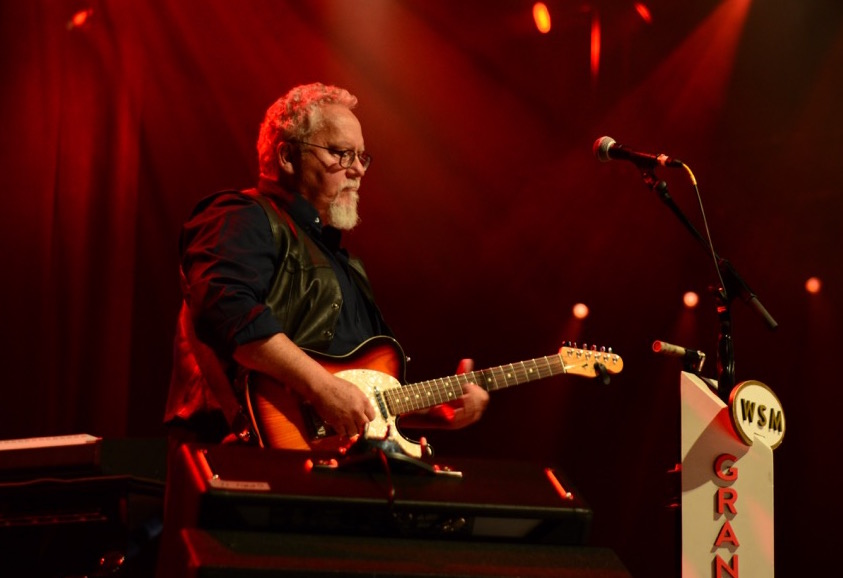
- Barnes performing in 2017

Background information
- Born: Max Troy Barnes; October 25, 1962 (age 63)
- Origin: Omaha, Nebraska, U.S.
- Genres: Country
- Occupations: Singer-songwriter; record producer; studio musician; music executive
- Years active: 1982–present
- Label: Hypermedia Nashville
- Website: www.maxtbarnes.net

Max Troy Barnes (born October 25, 1962) is an American country music singer-songwriter studio musician and producer. He is the son of songwriter Max D. Barnes. He has written songs with sales over 20 million records. Barnes resides on a ranch near Hendersonville, Tennessee. He and his wife keep a second home in County Mayo, Ireland.

In March 2018 he received Hot Country TV's award for "2018 International Artist of the Year".

== Songwriting ==
Barnes is most known as a BMI and ASCAP award-winning songwriter. Artists like John Anderson ("Let Go of the Stone"), John Schneider ("At the Sound of the Tone"), Randy Travis ("Before You Kill Us All"), Diamond Rio ("How Your Love Makes Me Feel"), Collin Raye ("Love, Me") and Vern Gosdin ("Way Down Deep") have recorded his songs, as have many others. "Love, Me" released in 1991, became Raye's first Number One single on the U.S. Billboard Hot Country Singles & Tracks charts.

The only father and son to ever compete for CMA Song of the Year

In 1992 "Love, Me" (I Read A Note My Grandma Wrote) received a Song of the Year nomination from the Country Music Association. The song did not win however, and the award was given to a song his father, Max D. Barnes had written with Vince Gill entitled, "Look at Us".

Other artists that have recorded Barnes' songs include George Jones, Jo Dee Messina, Montgomery Gentry, Alabama, Gene Watson, Mark Wills, Cledus T. Judd, Daryl Singletary, Ralph Stanley, Trace Atkins, Ray Stevens, John Schneider, Linda Davis, James Bonamy, Billy Dean, Foster and Allen, Daniel O'Donnell, Trudi Lawlor, and Billy Joe Royal

== Producer ==
Barnes' production credits include the 2018 Bobby Bare album, "Things Change" which included a duet with Chris Stapleton. "Life Is Like A Mountain Railroad" for George Jones, and The Smith Brothers, Real Life by Jeff Carson, the self-titled album by the Marie Sisters on MCA Records. In the 1990s he scored the film, A Letter from Death Row, a film produced and directed by Bret Michaels starring Michaels, Charlie Sheen and Martin Sheen. Barnes also produced the Major League: Back to the Minors soundtrack and several singles by the Smokin' Armadillos.

== Studio work ==
In 1982 at the age of 20 Barnes was already touring, writing, and recording with major acts. He played lead guitar and sang vocals on "The Sun Never Sets" as part of Joe Sun and the Solar System. Recorded in London, England on Sonnet Records. Other credits to Barnes include backup vocals on Roadhouses and Dance Halls, an album by Lonnie Mack recorded in Muscle Shoals, Alabama.

Barnes played lead guitar on the album Wait 'Til I Get My Hands on You by Wynn Stewart and played acoustic guitar on "How Do I Live" by LeAnn Rimes. During his time as a songwriter and producer at Curb Records, Barnes played lead guitar on the "Christmas Time" album for Eddy Arnold. He is also credited with background vocals on "It's You Again" by Skip Ewing. In 2017 Barnes Played Electric guitar on Dylan Scott's "I Can't Take Her Anywhere" on Curb Records.

== Live performance ==
Max T. Barnes tours North America as well as Europe singing his own new releases as well as the No. 1 songs he has written. Barnes has performed as a lead guitar player on live tours worldwide with country music artists Joe Sun, Bobby Bare, Shelly West, Skip Ewing, Linda Davis and Tanya Tucker, among others. In 2018 Hot Country TV presented Max T. Barnes with "International Country Music Artist of the Year" award.

== ASCAP awards ==
- "Love, Me" – 1992 CMA Song of the Year Nominee
- "Let Go of the Stone" – 1992 Country Award
- "At the Sound of the Tone" – 1986 Country Award
- "Before You Kill Us All" – 1994 Country Award
- "That Girl's Been Spyin' on Me" – 1996 Country Award
- "How Your Love Makes Me Feel" – 1997 Country Award
- "A Night to Remember" – 1999 Country Award

== BMI awards ==
- "Way Down Deep" – 2002 Country Award
- "Tougher Than Nails" – 2004 Country Award
- BMI "Million Air" Awards "Love, Me" – Collin Raye 4 million airplay
- BMI "Million Air" Awards "How Your Love Makes Me Feel" Diamond Rio – 2 million airplay
- BMI "Million Air" Awards "A Night to Remember" – 2 million airplay
