= I Can Tell by the Way You Dance (You're Gonna Love Me Tonight) =

Single by Vern Gosdin

from the album There is a Season
- Released: March 26, 1984
- Recorded: 1983
- Genre: Country
- Length: 2:40
- Label: Compleat
- Songwriters: Sandy Pinkard, Robb Strandlund
- Producer: Blake Mevis

Vern Gosdin singles chronology
"I Wonder Where We'd Be Tonight" (1983)	"I Can Tell by the Way You Dance (You're Gonna Love Me Tonight)" (1984)	"What Would Your Memories Do" (1984)

"I Can Tell by the Way You Dance (You're Gonna Love Me Tonight)" is a song written by Sandy Pinkard and Rob Strandlund, and originally recorded by Johnny Lee on the 1980 Coast to Coast Soundtrack. The song was later recorded by American country music artist Vern Gosdin and released in March 1984 as the lead single from his album There is a Season. The song was Gosdin's eighteenth country hit and the first of three number ones on the country chart. The single spent one week at number one and a total of fourteen weeks on the country chart.

== Background ==
Gosdin, originally, felt the song was too rock 'n' roll for him and didn't record it for two years after it was presented to him.

== Other versions ==
Gary Morris on his 1982 self-titled album and Josh Turner on Country State of Mind.

== Charts ==
=== Weekly charts ===
Chart (1984)	Peak position
US Hot Country Songs (Billboard)	1
Canadian RPM Country Tracks	1

=== Year-end charts ===
Chart (1984)	Position
US Hot Country Songs (Billboard)	2
