= Way Down Deep =

Single by Vern Gosdin

from the album If You're Gonna Do Me Wrong (Do It Right)
- B-side: "Today My World Slipped Away"
- Released: June 4, 1983
- Genre: Country
- Length: 2:48
- Label: Compleat
- Songwriter(s): Max D. Barnes, Max T. Barnes
- Producer(s): Blake Mevis

Vern Gosdin singles chronology
"Friday Night Feelin" (1983)	"Way Down Deep" (1983)	"I Wonder Where We'd Be Tonight" (1983)

"Way Down Deep" is a song written by Max D. Barnes and Max T. Barnes, and recorded by American country music artist Vern Gosdin. It was released in June 1983 as the second single from the album If You're Gonna Do Me Wrong (Do It Right). The song reached #5 on the Billboard Hot Country Singles & Tracks chart.

== Chart performance ==
Chart (1983)	Peak position
US Hot Country Songs (Billboard)	5
Canadian RPM Country Tracks	3
