= Chiseled in Stone =

Single by Vern Gosdin

from the album Chiseled in Stone
- B-side: "Tight as Twin Fiddles"
- Released: August 27, 1988
- Genre: Country
- Length: 3:51
- Label: Columbia Nashville
- Songwriter(s): Vern Gosdin, Max D. Barnes
- Producer(s): Bob Montgomery

Vern Gosdin singles chronology
"Set 'Em Up Joe" (1988)	"Chiseled in Stone" (1988)	"Who You Gonna Blame It On This Time" (1989)

"Chiseled in Stone" is a song co-written and recorded by American country music artist Vern Gosdin. It was released in August 1988 as the third single and title track from the album Chiseled in Stone. The song reached #6 on the Billboard Hot Country Singles & Tracks chart. Gosdin wrote the song with Max D. Barnes.

"Chiseled in Stone" won the Country Music Association's Song of the Year award in 1989.

The backing vocals you hear in the song is a country artist who tours extensively with Gosdin by the name of Rodney Collins from the Second Hand Smoke Band.

== Chart performance ==
Chart (1988)	Peak position
US Hot Country Songs (Billboard)	6
Canadian RPM Country Tracks	3
