= Max D. Barnes =

American singer-songwriter (1935-2004)

- Born: Max Duane Barnes; July 24, 1935; Hard Scratch, Iowa, U.S.
- Died: January 11, 2004 (aged 68) Nashville, Tennessee, U.S.
- Genres: Country
- Years active: 1960–2004
- Labels: Ovation, Polydor, Country Roads Records (UK)

Max Duane Barnes (July 24, 1935 – January 11, 2004) was an American country singer and songwriter born in Hard Scratch, Iowa, United States. In 1973, Barnes moved with his family from Omaha, Nebraska to Nashville, Tennessee, where he died at age 68.

== Career ==
Barnes gained success as a recording artist in the 1970s for Ovation Records, Polydor, and Country Roads Records.

Over the course of his career, Barnes recorded more than 400 songs. He composed some of the most popular country songs of the 1980s and 1990s. His works have sold over 50 million records worldwide.

Notable cuts include:

- Delbert McClinton: "Every Time I Roll the Dice"
- George Jones: "Who's Gonna Fill Their Shoes"
- Waylon Jennings: "Drinkin' and Dreamin'"
- Conway Twitty: "Red Neckin' Love Makin' Night"
- Keith Whitley: "Ten Feet Away"
- Randy Travis: "Storms Of Life", "If I Didn't Have You", and "I Won't Need You Anymore (Always and Forever)"
- Vern Gosdin: "Chiseled in Stone", "If You're Gonna Do Me Wrong (Do It Right)", "This Ain't My First Rodeo", "Way Down Deep", and "Slow Burning Memory"
- Pam Tillis: "Don't Tell Me What to Do"
- Vince Gill: "Look at Us"
- The Kendalls & Alan Jackson: "Thank God for the Radio"
- Eddy Raven: "Joe Knows How to Live"
- John Anderson: "I've Got It Made", "Let Go of the Stone"

== Personal life ==
Prior to gaining fame as a singer and songwriter, he was a semi-truck driver. He was the father of three children, Genevieve Barnes Kephart, DeWayne Patrick Barnes and his youngest son, the award-winning singer-songwriter Max T. Barnes.

== Death ==
Max D. Barnes died on January 11, 2004, at the age of 67, due to complications of pneumonia.

== Awards ==
Barnes is a two-time Country Music Association Awards Song of the Year winner, in 1988 for "Chiseled in Stone," co-written with Vern Gosdin, and in 1992 for "Look at Us," co-written with Vince Gill. He was nominated for a Grammy Award in 1989 for "Chiseled in Stone". He won the BMI Songwriter Award 18 times. In 1992, he was inducted into the Nashville Songwriters Association's International Hall of Fame. He received the following awards:

- "Chiseled in Stone" – 1989 Country Award
- "Don't Take It Away" – 1980 Country Award
- "Don't Tell Me What to Do" – 1992 Country Award/Million-Air (Two million)
- "Drinkin' and Dreamin'" – 1986 Country Award
- "I Can't Love You Enough" – 1978 Country Award
- "I've Got It Made" – 1995 Country Award/Million-Air
- "I Won't Need You Anymore (Always and Forever)" – 1988 Country Award/Million-Air
- "If I Didn't Have You" – 1993 Country Award/Million-Air (Two million)
- "Joe Knows How To Live" – 1989 Country Award/Million-Air
- "Let Go of The Stone" – 1993 Country Award/Million-Air
- "Look at Us" – 1992 Country Award/Million-Air (Two million)
- "Ten Feet Away" – 1987 Country Award
- "Red Neckin' Love Makin' Night" – 1982 Pop Award/1982 Country Award
- "Thank God for the Radio" – 1985 Country Award
- "That Just About Does It" – 1990 Country Award
- "Way Down Deep" – 1984 Country Award
- "Who's Gonna Fill Their Shoes" – 1987 Country Award
- "Do You Believe Me Now?" – Million-Air
