= If You're Gonna Do Me Wrong (Do It Right) =

Single by Vern Gosdin

from the album If You're Gonna Do Me Wrong (Do It Right)
- B-side: "Favorite Fool of All"
- Released: February 12, 1983
- Genre: Country
- Length: 3:18
- Label: Compleat
- Songwriter(s): Vern Gosdin, Max D. Barnes
- Producer(s): Blake Mevis

Vern Gosdin singles chronology
"Friday Night Feelin'" (1983)	"If You're Gonna Do Me Wrong (Do It Right)" (1983)	"Way Down Deep" (1983)

"If You're Gonna Do Me Wrong (Do It Right)" is a song co-written and recorded by American country music artist Vern Gosdin. It was released in February 1983 as the first single and title track from the album If Gonna Do Me Wrong (Do It Right). The song reached #5 on the Billboard Hot Country Singles & Tracks chart. Gosdin wrote the song with Max D. Barnes.

The song entered the charts at the same week as Gosdin's last single for AMI Records, "Friday Night Feelin'". That song charted at number 49 and was never included on an album. Kelly Lang covered the song; her version was released as a single to country radio on March 10, 2014.

== Chart performance ==
Chart (1983)	Peak position
US Hot Country Songs (Billboard)	5
Canadian RPM Country Tracks	39
