= Vern Gosdin =

American country music singer (1934–2009)

- Gosdin performing on TNN, 1999

Background information
- Born: Vernon Gosdin; August 5, 1934; Woodland, Alabama, U.S.
- Died: April 28, 2009 (aged 74) Nashville, Tennessee, U.S.
- Genres: Country, gospel, bluegrass, folk rock
- Occupations: Singer, songwriter
- Instruments: Vocals, guitar
- Years active: 1967–2009
- Labels: Elektra; Ovation; AMI; A&M; Compleat; Columbia Records; VGM
- Formerly of: Emmylou Harris; George Jones; George Strait

Vernon Gosdin (August 5, 1934 – April 28, 2009), known as country music's "the Voice", was an American country music singer. He had 19 top-10 solo hits on the country music charts from 1977 through 1990. Three of these hits went to number one: "I Can Tell by the Way You Dance (You're Gonna Love Me Tonight)", "Set 'Em Up Joe", and "I'm Still Crazy".

== Career ==
=== Early years ===
As the sixth child in a family of nine, Vern Gosdin began singing in Bethel East Baptist Church in his birth place of Woodland, Alabama, United States, where his mother played piano. Gosdin and two brothers sang gospel on Birmingham radio station WVOK. Gosdin later moved to Chicago, Illinois, where he operated the D&G Tap. He idolized the Louvin Brothers and the Blue Sky Boys as a young man.

=== 1960s: West Coast Country music movement ===
In 1961, Gosdin moved to California, where he joined the West Coast country music movement, first as a member of the Golden State Boys, which became the Hillmen, and included Chris Hillman. Gosdin then formed the Gosdin Brothers with brother Rex. The duo appeared on the charts in the late 1960s with a song titled "Hangin' On" on the Bakersfield International label, then with "Till the End" on Capitol Records. During the same time, the Gosdin Brothers were featured on Hillman's former Byrds bandmate Gene Clark's first solo album, the 1967 well-regarded Gene Clark with the Gosdin Brothers, singing backing vocals on all of the tracks behind the lead vocals of Clark and lead guitars of Clarence White, Glen Campbell, and Bill Rinehart (later of the Merry-Go-Round).

=== 1970s: Retirement and comeback ===
Gosdin retired from performing during the 1970s and moved to Cartersville, Georgia, where he operated a glass company. In 1976, he signed with Elektra Records, and his first hit was a remake of "Hangin' On", which featured Emmylou Harris on harmony vocals and peaked at number 16. His next single, "Yesterday's Gone", written by Wayne Hinsen Bradford, who also wrote for Emmylou Harris, also featured Harris, and became his first top-10 hit in 1977. Several more hits followed between 1977 and 1979, with the biggest of these hits being a remake of "Till the End" and a cover of the Association's "Never My Love", which also featured harmony vocals from Janie Fricke.

=== 1981–1983: "Today My World Slipped Away" ===
In 1981, Gosdin signed with Ovation Records and scored a top-10 hit with "Dream of Me". After Ovation Records closed later in 1981, Gosdin signed with AMI Records, where he scored a top-10 hit in 1982 with "Today My World Slipped Away". (This song later became a number-three hit for George Strait).

In January 1982, during a trial that examined the attempted assassination of music producer Gary S. Paxton, Darryl C. Langley claimed under oath that his cohort and he were hired attackers employed by Gosdin, who worked closely with Paxton and was alleged to be disgruntled in their working relationship. Gosdin was never arrested or charged, and repeatedly refused to confirm or deny involvement for the remainder of his life.

Gosdin signed with Complete Records in the early 1980s, and in 1984, released There Is a Season, picked by the Los Angeles Times as best country album of the year. The early 1980s also found a great combination of talent as Gosdin traveled from coast to coast opening shows for George Jones.

=== 1983–1985: "If You're Gonna Do Me Wrong (Do It Right)"' and There Is a Season ===
Gosdin consistently reached the top 10 in the early 1980s, really hitting his stride when he teamed with Barnes as a songwriting collaborator. The pair specialized in songs of cheating and barroom romance, often delivering an over-the-top emotionalism that got Gosdin compared to George Jones. In 1983, Gosdin had two top-five hits — "If You're Gonna Do Me Wrong (Do It Right)" and "Way Down Deep", with the former earning him a nomination for the Grammy Award for Best Country Vocal Performance, Male. The following year, he had his first number-one single with "I Can Tell by the Way You Dance (You're Gonna Love Me Tonight)", which had previously been recorded by Gary Morris. On September 22, 1985, Gosdin appeared at the original Farm Aid concert at the University of Illinois' Memorial Stadium.

=== 1987–1989: "Chiseled in Stone" ===
After Compleat Records went bankrupt, Gosdin signed with Columbia in 1987. He immediately had success with "Do You Believe Me Now", and scored another number-one hit with a tribute to Ernest Tubb called "Set 'Em Up Joe". Gosdin's "Chiseled in Stone", co-written with Barnes, won the Country Music Association's Song of the Year award in 1989 and earned them a nomination for the Grammy Award for Best Country Song.

=== 1989–1990: Alone ===
Gosdin's 1989 album, Alone, was a concept album in a traditional country style. It chronicled the dissolution of Gosdin's marriage and included his final number-one hit: "I'm Still Crazy". From 1989 to 1991, he released a number of songs and three more made the Billboard top 10: "Right in the Wrong Direction", "That Just About Does It", and "Is It Raining at Your House". "Raining" has been covered by Brad Paisley and Lorrie Morgan, and "That Just About Does It" was covered by Willie Nelson.

=== Later years ===
Gosdin suffered a stroke in 1998, but he continued writing and singing until his death. In 2009, Gosdin collaborated with Joe Sins of the country music duo The Sins to write and record his final four songs.

== Death ==
Gosdin suffered another stroke in early April 2009, and died at a Nashville hospital on the evening of April 28 at the age of 74. His remains were buried at Mount Olivet Cemetery in Nashville, Tennessee.

== Awards and nominations ==
=== Grammy Awards ===
Year	Nominee / work	Award	Result
1984	"If You're Gonna Do Me Wrong (Do It Right)"	Best Male Country Vocal Performance	Nominated
1989	"Chiseled in Stone"	Best Country Song	Nominated

=== Academy of Country Music Awards ===
Year	Nominee / work	Award	Result
1978	Vern Gosdin	Top New Male Vocalist	Nominated
1989	"Set 'Em Up Joe"	Song of the Year	Nominated
1989	Chiseled in Stone	Album of the Year	Nominated

=== Country Music Association Awards ===
Year	Nominee / work	Award	Result
1983	"If You're Gonna Do Me Wrong (Do It Right)"	Song of the Year	Nominated
1983	Vern Gosdin	Horizon Award	Nominated
1984	Vern Gosdin	Horizon Award	Nominated
1988	Vern Gosdin	Male Vocalist of the Year	Nominated
1988	Chiseled in Stone	Album of the Year	Nominated
1989	"Chiseled in Stone"	Single of the Year	Nominated
1989	"Chiseled in Stone"	Song of the Year	Won

== Bibliography ==
- Hines, Geoffrey (1998). "Vern Gosdin". In The Encyclopedia of Country Music. Paul Kingsbury, Editor. New York: Oxford University Press. pp. 206–7.
