= Clint Black discography =

Recording collections by American country singer Clint Black

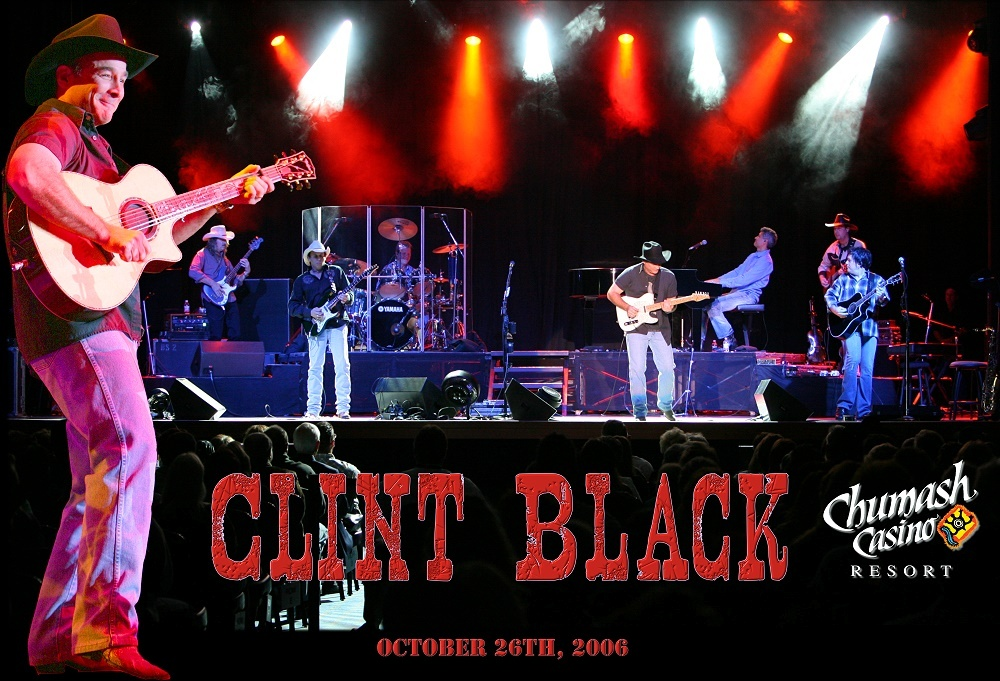
- Clint Black in concert at the Chumash Casino Resort in Santa Ynez, California, on October 26, 2006.
- Studio albums: 14
- Extended plays: 1
- Live albums: 1
- Compilation albums: 8
- Singles: 50
- Music videos: 26

Clint Black is an American country music singer. His discography consists of 14 studio albums, eight compilation albums, one extended play and 50 singles. Black debuted in 1989 with the single "A Better Man", the first of four consecutive Number One country hits from his album Killin' Time for RCA Nashville. Over the next decade, he released six more albums for RCA and two more on his own label, Equity Music Group. Black's RCA albums are all certified gold or higher by the Recording Industry Association of America (RIAA). He has sold 19 million albums worldwide.

Among his singles, Black has sent 13 cuts to Number One on the Hot Country Songs charts and 15 other singles within Top 10 on the same. His longest-lasting Number Ones are "Nobody's Home" and "Like the Rain" at three weeks each.

== Studio albums ==
=== 1980s–1990s ===
Title	Album details	Peak positions				Certifications
Title	Album details	US Country	US	CAN Country	CAN	Certifications
Killin' Time	Release date: May 2, 1989; Label: RCA Nashville; Formats: CD, LP, cassette	1	31	6	93	CAN: Platinum; RIAA: 3× Platinum
Put Yourself in My Shoes	Release date: November 27, 1990; Label: RCA Nashville; Formats: CD, cassette	1	18	—	—	CAN: Platinum; RIAA: 3× Platinum
The Hard Way	Release date: July 14, 1992; Label: RCA Nashville; Formats: CD, cassette	2	8	3	47	CAN: Gold; RIAA: Platinum
No Time to Kill	Release date: July 13, 1993; Label: RCA Nashville; Formats: CD, cassette	2	14	3	59	CAN: Gold; RIAA: Platinum
One Emotion	Release date: October 4, 1994; Label: RCA Nashville; Formats: CD, cassette	8	37	—	—	CAN: Platinum; RIAA: Platinum
Looking for Christmas	Release date: October 17, 1995; Label: RCA Nashville; Formats: CD, cassette	25	138	—	—	
Nothin' but the Taillights	Release date: July 29, 1997; Label: RCA Nashville; Formats: CD, cassette	4	43	5	—	CAN: Gold; RIAA: Platinum
D'lectrified	Release date: September 28, 1999; Label: RCA Nashville; Formats: CD, cassette	7	75	7	—	RIAA: Gold
"—" denotes releases that did not chart

=== 2000s–2020s ===
Title	Album details	Peak positions		
Title	Album details	US Country	US	US Indie
Spend My Time	Release date: March 2, 2004; Label: Equity Music Group; Formats: CD, music download	3	27	1
Christmas with You	Release date: September 14, 2004; Label: Equity Music Group; Formats: CD, music download	46	—	24
Drinkin' Songs and Other Logic	Release date: October 4, 2005; Label: Equity Music Group; Formats: CD, music download	36	—	22
The Love Songs	Release date: January 30, 2007; Label: Equity Music Group; Formats: CD, music download	37	—	24
On Purpose	Release date: September 25, 2015; Label: Blacktop / Thirty Tigers; Formats: CD, music download	13	—	20
Out of Sane	Release date: June 19, 2020; Label: Blacktop / Thirty Tigers; Formats: CD, music download	—	—	—
"—" denotes releases that did not chart

== Live albums ==
Title	Album details
Still Killin' Time	Release date: November 8, 2019; Label: Blacktop / Thirty Tigers; Formats: CD, music download

== Compilation albums ==
Title	Album details	Peak positions					Certifications
Title	Album details	US Country	US	US Indie	CAN Country	CAN	Certifications
Greatest Hits	Release date: September 24, 1996; Label: RCA Nashville; Formats: CD, cassette	2	12	—	5	81	CAN: Platinum; RIAA: 2× Platinum
Super Hits	Release date: October 27, 1998; Label: RCA Nashville; Formats: CD, cassette	—	—	—	—	—	
Greatest Hits II	Release date: October 30, 2001; Label: RCA Nashville; Formats: CD, cassette	8	97	—	—	—	
Super Hits	Release date: January 21, 2003; Label: RCA Nashville; Formats: CD	53	—	—	—	—	
Ultimate Clint Black	Release date: September 23, 2003; Label: RCA Nashville / BMG Heritage; Formats: CD	39	—	—	—	—	
16 Biggest Hits	Release date: April 11, 2006; Label: RCA Records Nashville; Formats: CD, music download	72	—	—	—	—	
When I Said I Do	Release date: August 5, 2013; Label: Cracker Barrel; Formats: CD	30	162	30	—	—	
The Clint Black Christmas Collection	Release date: November 30, 2018; Label: Blacktop; Formats: CD, music download	—	—	—	—	—	
"—" denotes releases that did not chart

== Extended plays ==
Title	EP details
The Long Cool EP	Release date: March 11, 2008; Label: Equity Music Group; Formats: music download

== Singles ==
=== 1980s–1990s ===
Year	Single	Peak positions				Certifications	Album
Year	Single	US Country	US	CAN Country	CAN AC	Certifications	
1989	"A Better Man"	1	—	1	—	RIAA: Gold	Killin' Time
1989	"Killin' Time"	1	—	1	—	RIAA: Platinum	Killin' Time
1989	"Nobody's Home"	1	—	1	—		Killin' Time
1990	"Walkin' Away"	1	—	1	—		Killin' Time
1990	"Nothing's News"	3	—	1	—		Killin' Time
1990	"Put Yourself in My Shoes"	4	—	3	—		Put Yourself in My Shoes
1991	"Loving Blind"	1	—	1	—		Put Yourself in My Shoes
1991	"One More Payment"	7	—	7	—		Put Yourself in My Shoes
1991	"Where Are You Now"	1	—	1	—		Put Yourself in My Shoes
1992	"We Tell Ourselves"	2	—	1	—		The Hard Way
1992	"Burn One Down"	4	—	2	—		The Hard Way
1993	"When My Ship Comes In"	1	—	1	—		The Hard Way
1993	"A Bad Goodbye" (with Wynonna Judd)	2	43	1	—		No Time to Kill
1993	"No Time to Kill"	3	—	2	—		No Time to Kill
1993	"State of Mind"	2	— (Note: "State of Mind" did not enter the Hot 100, but peaked at number two on Bubbling Under Hot 100 Singles.)	2	—		No Time to Kill
1994	"A Good Run of Bad Luck"	1	—	1	—		No Time to Kill
1994	"Half the Man"	4	—	5	—		No Time to Kill
1994	"Untanglin' My Mind"	4	—	3	—		One Emotion
1995	"Wherever You Go"	3	—	4	—		One Emotion
1995	"Summer's Comin'"	1	—	1	—		One Emotion
1995	"One Emotion"	2	—	1	—		One Emotion
1995	"Life Gets Away"	4	—	1	—		One Emotion
1996	"Like the Rain"	1	—	1	47	RIAA: Gold	Greatest Hits
1996	"Half Way Up"	6	—	4	—		Greatest Hits
1997	"Still Holding On" (with Martina McBride)	11	—	1	50		Nothin' but the Taillights
1997	"Something That We Do"	2	76	4	—		Nothin' but the Taillights
1998	"Nothin' but the Taillights"	1	— (Note: "Nothin' but the Taillights" did not enter the Hot 100, but peaked at number sixteen on Bubbling Under Hot 100 Singles.)	1	—		Nothin' but the Taillights
1998	"The Shoes You're Wearing"	1	— (Note: "The Shoes You're Wearing" did not enter the Hot 100, but peaked at number eighteen on Bubbling Under Hot 100 Singles.)	1	—		Nothin' but the Taillights
1998	"Loosen Up My Strings"	12	—	6	—		Nothin' but the Taillights
1999	"You Don't Need Me Now"	29	—	31	—		Nothin' but the Taillights
1999	"When I Said I Do" (with Lisa Hartman Black)	1	31	1	—	RIAA: Gold	D'lectrified
"—" denotes releases that did not chart

=== 2000s–2020s ===
Year	Single	Peak positions			Album
Year	Single	US Country	US	CAN Country	Album
2000	"Been There" (with Steve Wariner)	5	44	1	D'lectrified
2000	"Love She Can't Live Without"	30	—	45	D'lectrified
2001	"Easy for Me to Say" (with Lisa Hartman Black)	27	—	—	Greatest Hits II
2002	"Money or Love"	50	—	—	Greatest Hits II
2003	"Iraq and Roll" (Note: "Iraq and Roll" was exclusively available as a download from Black's website.)	42	—	—	—N/a
2003	"Spend My Time"	16	— (Note: "Spend My Time" did not enter the Hot 100, but peaked at number two on Bubbling Under Hot 100 Singles.)	—	Spend My Time
2004	"The Boogie Man"	51	—	—	Spend My Time
2004	"My Imagination"	42	—	—	Spend My Time
2005	"Rainbow in the Rain"	44	—	—	Drinkin' Songs and Other Logic
2005	"Code of the West"	—	—	—	Drinkin' Songs and Other Logic
2006	"Drinkin' Songs and Other Logic"	54	—	—	Drinkin' Songs and Other Logic
2006	"Heartaches"	—	—	—	Drinkin' Songs and Other Logic
2007	"The Strong One"	37	—	—	The Long Cool EP
2008	"Long Cool Woman"	58	—	—	The Long Cool EP
2015	"Time for That"	—	—	—	On Purpose
2016	"You Still Get to Me" (with Lisa Hartman Black)	—	—	—	On Purpose
2016	"Still Calling It News"	—	—	—	On Purpose
2019	"This Old House" (with Trace Adkins, Dierks Bentley, Sara Evans, Cody Jinks, Michael Ray, Darius Rucker, Travis Tritt, and Steve Wariner)	—	—	—	Still Killin' Time
2020	"America (Still in Love with You)"	—	—	—	Out of Sane
"—" denotes releases that did not chart

=== Christmas singles ===
Year	Single	Peak positions	Album
Year	Single	US Country	Album
1990	"Til' Santa's Gone (I Just Can't Wait)" (Note: Originally released in 1990, "Til' Santa's Gone (I Just Can't Wait)" charted on Hot Country Songs at number 58 in 1996, number 65 in 1997, number 40 in 1998, number 38 in 1999, and number 34 in 2000. From 1996 to 1998, the song was titled "Til' Santa's Gone (Milk and Cookies)" on the charts.)	34	Home for the Holidays
1995	"The Kid" (Note: "The Kid" charted on Hot Country Songs at number 71 in 1996, number 67 in 1999, and number 71 in 2000.)	67	Looking for Christmas
2004	"Christmas with You"	54	Christmas with You

=== As a featured artist ===
Year	Single	Peak positions		Album
Year	Single	US Country	CAN Country	Album
1991	"Hold On Partner" (Roy Rogers with Clint Black)	42	48	Tribute
1992	"Hotel Whiskey" (Hank Williams, Jr. with Clint Black)	54	82	Maverick
1994	"Amazing Grace" (as The Maverick Choir)	—	—	Maverick (soundtrack)
1998	"Same Old Train" (Note: All-star collaboration featuring Clint Black, Joe Diffie, Merle Haggard, Emmylou Harris, Alison Krauss, Patty Loveless, Earl Scruggs, Ricky Skaggs, Marty Stuart, Pam Tillis, Randy Travis, Travis Tritt, and Dwight Yoakam.)	59	—	Tribute to Tradition
2004	"Hey Good Lookin'" (with Jimmy Buffett with Clint Black, Kenny Chesney, Alan Jackson, Toby Keith, and George Strait)	8	—	License to Chill
2005	"Grain of Salt" (Ray Herndon with Clint Black)	—	—	Livin' the Dream
"—" denotes releases that did not chart

== Other charted songs ==
Year	Title	Peak positions		Album
Year	Title	US Country	CAN Country	Album
1991	"This Nightlife"	61	—	Put Yourself in My Shoes
1993	"Desperado"	54	52	Common Thread: The Songs of the Eagles
"—" denotes releases that did not chart

=== B-sides ===
Year	Title	Peak positions	A-side
Year	Title	US Country	A-side
1994	"Tuckered Out"	74	"State of Mind"

== Music videos ==
Year	Video	Director
1989	"A Better Man"	Bill Young
1989	"Killin' Time"	Bill Young
1990	"Walkin' Away"	Jim May
1990	"Put Yourself in My Shoes"	Dean Lent
1991	"Loving Blind"	Bill Young
1992	"We Tell Ourselves"	Michael Patterson/Candace Reckinger
1993	"When My Ship Comes In"	Steven Goldmann
1993	"A Bad Goodbye" (with Wynonna Judd)	Peter Nydrle
1994	"State of Mind"	Palomar Pictures
1994	"A Good Run of Bad Luck"	Clint Black
1994	"Untanglin' My Mind"	Clint Black
1995	"Summer's Comin'"	Clint Black
1995	"One Emotion"	Clint Black
1997	"Something That We Do"	Timothy White/Clint Black
1998	"Cadillac Jack Favor"	Clint Black
1998	"The Shoes You're Wearing"	Clint Black/Brent Hedgecock
1999	"When I Said I Do" (with Lisa Hartman Black)	Clint Black
2000	"Been There" (with Steve Wariner)	Clint Black
2001	"Easy for Me to Say" (with Lisa Hartman Black)	Clint Black
2002	"Money or Love"	Clint Black
2003	"Spend My Time"	Clint Black
2007	"The Strong One"	Shaun Silva
2016	"You Still Get to Me" (with Lisa Hartman Black)	Ben Boutwell
2016	"Still Calling It News"	Ethan Russell
2019	"This Old House" (with Trace Adkins, Dierks Bentley, Sara Evans, Cody Jinks, Michael Ray, Darius Rucker, Travis Tritt, and Steve Wariner)	Ben Boutwell
2020	"America (Still in Love with You)"	Clint Black/Ben Boutwell

=== Guest appearances ===
Year	Video	Director
1991	"Hold On, Partner" (with Roy Rogers)	Jack Cole
1991	"Hotel Whiskey" (with Hank Williams, Jr.)	Jack Cole
1992	"I Don't Need Your Rockin' Chair" (George Jones and Friends)	Marc Ball
1994	"Amazing Grace" (Maverick Choir)	Gil Bettman
1998	"Same Old Train" (various)	Steve Boyle
2004	"Hey, Good Lookin'" (with Jimmy Buffett, Kenny Chesney, Alan Jackson, Toby Keith and George Strait)	Trey Fanjoy/Stan Kellam
