= 16 Biggest Hits (Clint Black album) =

Greatest hits album by Clint Black
- Released: April 11, 2006
- Genre: Country
- Length: 56:46
- Label: Legacy Recordings

Clint Black chronology
Drinkin' Songs and Other Logic (2005)	16 Biggest Hits (2006)	The Love Songs (2007)

Professional ratings
Review scores
Source	Rating
Allmusic	4/5 stars

16 Biggest Hits is a 2006 Clint Black compilation album. It is part of a series of similar 16 Biggest Hits albums released by Legacy Recordings.

== Track listing ==
No.	Title	Writer(s)	Length
1.	"A Better Man"	Clint Black, Hayden Nicholas	3:05
2.	"Killin' Time"	Black, Nicholas	2:48
3.	"Nobody's Home"	Black	3:30
4.	"Put Yourself in My Shoes"	Black, Nicholas, Shake Russell	3:16
5.	"Loving Blind"	Black	3:57
6.	"One More Payment"	Black, Nicholas, Russell	2:16
7.	"Burn One Down"	Black, Frankie Miller, Nicholas	3:50
8.	"Half the Man"	Black, Nicholas	3:01
9.	"Untanglin' My Mind"	Black, Merle Haggard	3:25
10.	"Summer's Comin'"	Black, Nicholas	2:48
11.	"Like the Rain"	Black, Nicholas	4:22
12.	"Half Way Up"	Black, Nicholas	3:57
13.	"Still Holding On" (Duet with Martina McBride)	Black, Matraca Berg, Marty Stuart	4:39
14.	"Nothin' but the Taillights"	Black, Steve Wariner	3:53
15.	"The Shoes You're Wearing"	Black, Nicholas	3:31
16.	"When I Said I Do" (Duet with Lisa Hartman Black)	Black	4:28

== Chart performance ==
16 Biggest Hits peaked at #72 on the U.S. Billboard Top Country Albums chart the week of February 24, 2007.

Chart (2006–2007)	Peak position
U.S. Billboard Top Country Albums	72
