= Greatest Hits (Clint Black album) =

The Greatest Hits

Compilation album by Clint Black
- Released: September 24, 1996
- Genre: Country
- Length: 57:45
- Label: RCA Nashville
- Producer: James Stroud, Clint Black

Clint Black chronology
Looking for Christmas (1995)	The Greatest Hits (1996)	Nothin' but the Taillights (1997)

Singles from Greatest Hits
- 1. "Like the Rain" Released: September 2, 1996; 2. "Half Way Up" Released: November 18, 1996

The Greatest Hits is the first compilation album by country singer Clint Black. It compiles 12 hit songs from his first five albums. It also includes four new recordings: the singles "Like the Rain" and "Half Way Up", as well as "Cadillac Jack Favor" and a live cover of the Eagles' "Desperado". Black had originally covered this song in 1993 for the album, Common Thread: The Songs of the Eagles.

The compilation was a commercial and critical success, currently certified at double platinum by the RIAA.

Professional ratings
Review scores
Source	Rating
Allmusic	link
Entertainment Weekly	B link
Q	link
Robert Christgau	link

== Track listing ==
All tracks are written by Clint Black and Hayden Nicholas except where noted.

No.	Title	Writer(s)	Length
1.	"Like the Rain"		4:22
2.	"Summer's Comin'"		2:47
3.	"A Good Run of Bad Luck"		2:42
4.	"State of Mind"	Black	3:53
5.	"A Bad Goodbye" (duet with Wynonna Judd)	Black	3:40
6.	"A Better Man"		3:04
7.	"Killin' Time"		2:48
8.	"We Tell Ourselves"		4:38
9.	"Half Way Up"		3:58
10.	"Burn One Down"	Black, Nicholas, Frankie Miller	3:49
11.	"Cadillac Jack Favor" (based on rodeo star Jack Favor)		3:36
12.	"Put Yourself in My Shoes"	Black, Nicholas, Shake Russell	3:14
13.	"Wherever You Go"		4:13
14.	"Life Gets Away"	Black, Nicholas, Thom Schuyler	2:56
15.	"No Time to Kill"		4:00
16.	"Desperado" (live in San Antonio, Texas)	Glenn Frey, Don Henley	4:02

== Personnel ==
- Eddie Bayers - drums
- Clint Black - 12-string guitar, acoustic guitar, electric guitar, harmonica, lead vocals, background vocals
- Michael Black - background vocals
- Dane Bryant - piano, background vocals
- Larry Byrom - acoustic guitar
- Lenny Castro - percussion
- Larry Corbett - cello
- Eric Darken - percussion
- Brian Dembov - viola
- Steve Dorff - string arrangements
- Bonnie Douglas - violin
- Jerry Douglas - dobro
- Stuart Duncan - fiddle
- Thom Flora- background vocals
- Paul Franklin - steel guitar
- Tommy Funderbunk - background vocals
- Berj Garabedian - violin
- Sonny Garrish -steel guitar
- Dick Gay - drums, percussion
- James Getzoff - violin
- Ed Greene - drums
- Rob Hajacos - fiddle
- Lisa Hartman-Black - background vocals
- Aubrey Haynie - fiddle
- John Hobbs - piano
- Dann Huff - electric guitar
- Mitch Humphries - piano
- Jeff Huskins - fiddle, keyboards
- Wynonna Judd - vocals on "A Bad Goodbye"
- Dennis Karmazyn - cello
- Shane Keister - keyboards, piano
- Jan Kelley - cello
- Jana King - background vocals
- Ezra Kliger - violin
- Brian Leonard - violin
- Kenny Loggins - background vocals
- Joy Lyle - violin
- Liana Manis - background vocals
- Randy McCormick - keyboards
- Craig Morris - background vocals
- Buell Neidlinger - upright bass
- Maria Newman - violin
- Hayden Nicholas - acoustic guitar, electric guitar, sitar, background vocals
- Mark O'Connor - fiddle
- John Permenter - fiddle
- Jeff Peterson - dobro, steel guitar
- Jim Photogolo - background vocals
- Barbara Porter - violin
- Don Potter - acoustic guitar
- Steve Real - background vocals
- Michael Rhodes - bass guitar
- Matt Rollings - keyboards, piano
- Brent Rowan - electric guitar
- John Wesley Ryles - background vocals
- Timothy B. Schmit - background vocals
- Harry Shirinian - viola
- Harry Schultz - cello
- Paul Shure - violin
- Leland Sklar - bass guitar
- Spiro Stamos - violin
- Harry Stinson - background vocals
- James Stroud - percussion
- Ray Tisher - viola
- Wendy Waldman - background vocals
- Biff Watson - acoustic guitar
- Jake Willemain - bass guitar
- Dennis Wilson - background vocals
- John Wittenberg - violin
- Glenn Worf - bass guitar
- Curtis Young - background vocals
- Martin Young - acoustic guitar
- Reggie Young - electric guitar
- Tibor Zelig - violin
- Mihail Zinovyev - viola

== Charts ==
=== Weekly charts ===
Chart (1996)	Peak position
Canadian Albums (RPM)	81
Canadian Country Albums (RPM)	5
US Billboard 200	12
US Top Country Albums (Billboard)	2

=== Year-end charts ===
Chart (1996)	Position
US Billboard 200	161
US Top Country Albums (Billboard)	26
Chart (1997)	Position
US Billboard 200	79
US Top Country Albums (Billboard)	10
Chart (1998)	Position
US Top Country Albums (Billboard)	56

=== Singles ===
Year	Single	Peak chart positions		
Year	Single	US Country	CAN Country	CAN AC
1996	"Like the Rain"	1	1	47
1996	"Half Way Up"	6	4	-
