= Greatest Hits II (Clint Black album) =

Greatest hits album by Clint Black
- Released: October 30, 2001
- Genre: Country
- Length: 65:08
- Label: RCA Nashville
- Producer: Original recordings produced by Clint Black and James Stroud

Clint Black chronology
D'lectrified (1999)	Greatest Hits II (2001)	Spend My Time (2004)

Professional ratings
Review scores
Source	Rating
About.com	link
Allmusic	link

Greatest Hits II is the second compilation album by American country music singer Clint Black, released on October 30, 2001. It was his last release for RCA Nashville.

Like his first Greatest Hits volume, it compiles 12 hit songs from his previous albums and adds four new recordings: the romantic duet "Easy for Me to Say" (his second duet with wife Lisa Hartman Black), "Little Pearl and Lily's Lullaby" (a song for their then-newborn daughter), the country-rocker "Money or Love", and a newly recorded "blues version" of "Put Yourself in My Shoes". Also included is the long version of Black's 1997 duet with Martina McBride, "Still Holding On", which was the B-side of that single.

== Track listing ==
All songs written by Clint Black and Hayden Nicholas except where noted.

No.	Title	Writer(s)	Length
1.	"The Shoes You're Wearing"		3:57
2.	"Nothin' but the Taillights"	Black, Wariner	3:57
3.	"Nothing's News"	Black	3:04
4.	"Walkin' Away"	Black, Nicholas, Dick Gay	2:51
5.	"When My Ship Comes In"		3:37
6.	"Something That We Do"	Black, Skip Ewing	4:00
7.	"When I Said I Do" (duet with Lisa Hartman Black)	Black	4:30
8.	"Been There" (duet with Steve Wariner)	Black, Wariner	5:36
9.	"Still Holding On" (duet with Martina McBride (long version))	Black, Matraca Berg, Marty Stuart	4:53
10.	"Nobody's Home"	Black	3:31
11.	"One More Payment"	Black, Nicholas, Shake Russell	2:14
12.	"One Emotion"		2:44
13.	"Easy for Me to Say" (duet with Lisa Hartman Black)		5:38
14.	"Little Pearl and Lily's Lullaby"	Black	4:54
15.	"Money or Love"	Black	4:15
16.	"Put Yourself in My Shoes" (blues version)	Black, Nicholas, Russell	5:24

== Personnel ==
- Clint Black – acoustic guitar, electric guitar, lead vocals, background vocals
- Lily Pearl Black – animal sounds
- Lisa Hartman Black – vocals on "When I Said I Do" and "Easy for Me to Say"
- Lenny Castro – percussion
- Steve Dorff – string arrangements, conductor
- Wendell Kelly – trombone
- Randy Kerber – music box, piano
- Abe Laboriel Sr. – bass guitar
- Martina McBride – vocals on "Still Holding On"
- Hayden Nicholas – electric guitar
- Dean Parks – acoustic guitar
- Thomas R. Peterson – saxophone
- Steve Real – background vocals
- John "J.R." Robinson – drums
- Matt Rollings – piano, Wurlitzer
- Leland Sklar – bass guitar
- Shari Sutcliffe – string contractor
- Lee Thornburg – horn arrangements, trumpet
- Steve Wariner – acoustic guitar and vocals on "Been There"

== Chart performance ==
=== Weekly charts ===
Chart (2001)	Peak position
US Billboard 200	97
US Top Country Albums (Billboard)	8

=== Year-end charts ===
Chart (2002)	Position
US Top Country Albums (Billboard)	42

=== Singles ===
Year	Single	Peak positions
Year	Single	US Country
2001	"Easy for Me to Say" (with Lisa Hartman-Black)	27
2002	"Money or Love"	50
