= List of RPM number-one country singles of 1995 =

These are the Canadian number-one country songs of 1995, per the RPM Country Tracks chart.

Issue date	Title	Artist	Source
January 9	This Is Me	Randy Travis	
January 16	Not a Moment Too Soon	Tim McGraw	
January 23	Not a Moment Too Soon	Tim McGraw	
January 30	You and Only You	John Berry	
February 6	You and Only You	John Berry	
February 13	Mi Vida Loca (My Crazy Life)	Pam Tillis	
February 20	I'm Here	Charlie Major	
February 27	I'm Here	Charlie Major	
March 6	Old Enough to Know Better	Wade Hayes	
March 13	Hopeless Love	One Horse Blue	
March 20	Whose Bed Have Your Boots Been Under?	Shania Twain	
March 27	Whose Bed Have Your Boots Been Under?	Shania Twain	
April 3	O Siem	Susan Aglukark	
April 10	What's Holding Me	George Fox	
April 17	What Else Can I Do	Patricia Conroy	
April 24	The Heart Is a Lonely Hunter	Reba McEntire	
May 1	So Help Me Girl	Joe Diffie	
May 8	Little Miss Honky Tonk	Brooks & Dunn	
May 15	Don't Cry Little Angel	Prairie Oyster	
May 22	What Mattered Most	Ty Herndon	
May 29	What Kind of Man	Joel Feeney	
June 5	Any Man of Mine	Shania Twain	
June 12	Any Man of Mine	Shania Twain	
June 19	Any Man of Mine	Shania Twain	
June 26	Summer's Comin'	Clint Black	
July 3	Bringing Back Your Love	One Horse Blue	
July 10	Texas Tornado	Tracy Lawrence	
July 17	Sold (The Grundy County Auction Incident)	John Michael Montgomery	
July 24	First Comes Love	George Fox	
July 31	This Used to Be Our Town	Jason McCoy	
August 7	This Used to Be Our Town	Jason McCoy	
August 14	And Still	Reba McEntire	
August 21	Only One Moon	Prairie Oyster	
August 28	Only One Moon	Prairie Oyster	
September 4	You're Gonna Miss Me When I'm Gone	Brooks & Dunn	
September 11	She Ain't Your Ordinary Girl	Alabama	
September 18	One Emotion	Clint Black	
September 25	I Like It, I Love It	Tim McGraw	
October 2	I Like It, I Love It	Tim McGraw	
October 9	(I Do It) For the Money	Charlie Major	
October 16	She's Every Woman	Garth Brooks	
October 23	The Woman in Me (Needs the Man in You)	Shania Twain	
October 30	The Woman in Me (Needs the Man in You)	Shania Twain	
November 6	I'm Not Strong Enough to Say No	Blackhawk	
November 13	Learning a Lot About Love	Jason McCoy	
November 20	She's Every Woman	Garth Brooks	
November 27	Check Yes or No	George Strait	
December 4	Tall, Tall Trees	Alan Jackson	
December 11	Tall, Tall Trees	Alan Jackson	
December 18	Life Gets Away	Clint Black	

== See also ==
- 1995 in music
- List of number-one country hits of 1995 (U.S.)
