= The Love Songs (Clint Black album) =

Studio album by Clint Black
- Released: January 30, 2007
- Genre: Country
- Label: Equity
- Producer: Clint Black

Clint Black chronology
16 Biggest Hits (2006)	The Love Songs (2007)	When I Said I Do (2013)

Professional ratings
Review scores
Source	Rating
AllMusic	2.5/5 stars

The Love Songs is a 2007 album by country singer Clint Black. It consists of newly recorded versions of many of his love songs along with a cover version of Jim Croce's "I'll Have to Say I Love You in a Song".

According to Black, many of the songs remain true to the original version while a few get a slight update. "I wanted to do a record that's not just a reissue of hits", Black said.

The album cover was designed by Peter Max and depicts Black with wife Lisa Hartman Black.

== Track listing ==
No.	Title	Writer(s)	Length
1.	"When I Said I Do" (Duet with Lisa Hartman Black)	Black	4:33
2.	"You Made Me Feel"	Black, Michael McDonald	4:33
3.	"Something That We Do"	Black, Skip Ewing	4:38
4.	"Our Kind of Love" (duet with Carolyn Dawn Johnson)	Black, Shake Russell	4:06
5.	"My Imagination"	Black, Matt Rollings	3:53
6.	"Like the Rain"	Black, Hayden Nicholas	4:15
7.	"You Know It All"	Black, Steve Wariner	4:24
8.	"That Something in My Life"	Black, Kostas	2:55
9.	"One Emotion"	Black, Nicholas	2:51
10.	"Half the Man"	Black, Nicholas	3:04
11.	"Easy for Me to Say" (duet with Lisa Hartman Black)	Black, Nicholas	5:33
12.	"I'll Have to Say I Love You in a Song"	Jim Croce	2:34

== Personnel ==
Band

- Bryan Austin — acoustic guitar, background vocals
- Clint Black — acoustic guitar, harmonica, percussion, electric guitar, lead vocals, background vocals, bass harmonica
- Dane Bryant — piano, keyboards, background vocals
- Lenny Castro — percussion
- Perry Coleman — background vocals
- Steve Dorff — conductor, orchestral arrangements
- Stuart Duncan — fiddle, mandolin
- Paul Franklin — steel guitar
- Dick Gay — drums
- Carl Gorodetzky — concert master
- Lisa Hartman Black — duet vocals on "When I Said I Do" and "Easy for Me to Say"
- Wes Hightower — background vocals
- Carolyn Dawn Johnson — duet vocals on "Our Kind of Love"
- Abraham Laboriel — bass guitar
- Nashville String Machine — orchestra
- Hayden Nicholas — electric guitar
- Dean Parks — acoustic guitar
- Jeff Peterson — steel guitar
- John "J.R." Robinson — drums
- Matt Rollings — grand piano
- Steve Wariner — electric guitar, background vocals
- Jake Willemain — bass guitar
- Martin Young — acoustic guitar

Production

- Zack Berry — production coordinator, assistant engineer
- Clint Black — producer
- Zeke Clark — assistant engineer
- Ricky Cobble — engineer, mixing
- Steve Lockhart — technical support
- Ray Rogers — engineering support
- Hank Williams — mastering

== Chart positions ==
Chart (2007)	Peak position
US Top Country Albums	37
US Top Independent Albums	24
