= D'lectrified =

Album by Clint Black

Studio album by Clint Black
- Released: September 28, 1999
- Genre: Country
- Length: 53:38
- Label: RCA Nashville
- Producer: Clint Black

Clint Black chronology
Nothin' but the Taillights (1997)	D'lectrified (1999)	Greatest Hits II (2001)

Singles from D'lectrified
- 1. "When I Said I Do" Released: August 30, 1999; 2. "Been There" Released: January 10, 2000; 3. "Love She Can't Live Without" Released: June 24, 2000

Professional ratings
Review scores
Source	Rating
AllMusic	4.5/5 stars
Entertainment Weekly	C
Q	4/5 stars

D'lectrified is the eighth studio album by American country music singer Clint Black, released on September 28, 1999. It is also the first album in Black's career that he produced by himself.

The album was recorded entirely without electric instruments, hence the title. "There is not a single electric instrument on the album, but you wouldn't know it unless you were told. It is truly, totally unplugged," said Black. It was recorded entirely in ten weeks, "the fastest I'd ever done an album".

The album is an eclectic mix of material. In addition to a selection of new songs, it contains a number of cover versions, including a version of Waylon Jennings' "Are You Sure Hank Done It This Way", Monty Python's "Galaxy Song", The Marshall Tucker Band's "Bob Away My Blues" and Leon Russell's "Dixie Lullaby". It also has several collaborations, including the hits "When I Said I Do", a duet with Black's wife, Lisa Hartman Black, and "Been There", a duet with his friend Steve Wariner. Black also rearranged and re-recorded three previous songs of his own in the album's bluesier style.

While not as commercially successful as many of his other works, D'lectrified still became Black's eighth album to be certified gold by the RIAA.

== Track listing ==
No.	Title	Writer(s)	Length
1.	"Bob Away My Blues"	Toy Caldwell	3:06
2.	"Are You Sure Waylon Done It This Way" (duet with Waylon Jennings)	Waylon Jennings	5:55
3.	"Hand in the Fire"	Clint Black, Hayden Nicholas	4:38
4.	"Outside Intro (To Galaxy Song)" (feat. Eric Idle)	Black, Eric Idle	0:39
5.	"Galaxy Song"	Idle, John DuPrez	2:24
6.	"When I Said I Do" (Duet with Lisa Hartman Black)	Black	4:30
7.	"Been There" (Duet with Steve Wariner)	Black, Steve Wariner	5:27
8.	"Dixie Lullaby" (Duet with Bruce Hornsby)	Leon Russell, Chris Stainton	3:18
9.	"Where Your Love Won't Go"	Black, Wariner	2:43
10.	"Love She Can't Live Without"	Black, Skip Ewing	3:41
11.	"Burn One Down"	Black, Frankie Miller, Nicholas	3:57
12.	"Who I Use to Be"	Black, Nicholas	3:29
13.	"Harmony" (Duet with Kenny Loggins)	Black, Kenny Loggins, Nicholas	5:27
14.	"No Time to Kill"	Black, Nicholas	5:36
15.	"Something That We Do" (Instrumental version of the hit from 1997's Nothin' but the Taillights)	Black, Ewing	2:48

== Personnel ==
=== Musical credits ===
- Clint Black — lead vocals, background vocals, acoustic guitar, harmonica, bass harmonica, recorder
- Lisa Hartman-Black — vocals on "When I Said I Do"
- Lenny Castro — percussion, tambourine, washboard
- Steve Dorff — string arrangements, choir arrangements
- Jerry Douglas — Dobro
- Stuart Duncan — fiddle
- Skip Ewing — acoustic guitar
- Gary Grant — trumpet
- Larry Herbstritt — conductor
- Jerry Hey — trumpet
- Dan Higgins — baritone saxophone
- Bruce Hornsby — grand piano on "Dixie Lullaby" and "No Time to Kill", vocals on "Dixie Lullaby"
- Eric Idle — vocals on "Outside Intro (To Galaxy Song)"
- Waylon Jennings — vocals on "Are You Sure Waylon Done It This Way"
- Abraham Laboriel — acoustic bass
- Kenny Loggins — vocals on "Harmony"
- Kevin Nealon — banjo, 5-string banjo
- Hayden Nicholas — 12-string guitar, 12-string bass guitar
- Bobbi Page — background vocals
- Dean Parks — acoustic guitar, slide guitar, classical guitar, resonator guitar
- Joel Peskin — clarinet, tenor saxophone
- Steve Real — background vocals
- Bill Reichenbach Jr. — trombone
- John Robinson — drums
- Ray Rogers — tenor banjo
- Matt Rollings — piano, grand piano
- Marty Stuart — mandolin
- Steve Wariner — acoustic guitar and vocals on "Been There" and "Where Your Love Won't Go"
- Lawrence L. Williams — baritone saxophone
- Edgar Winter — alto saxophone

=== Production ===
- Clint Black — producer, engineer
- Jeff Basso — engineer
- Zack Berry — production coordinator
- Ricky Cobble — recorder, engineer
- Greg Collins — mixing assistant
- Steve Genewick — assistant engineer
- Richard Hanson — engineer, engineering support
- Julian King — recorder, engineer, mixing
- Matt Price — assistant engineer
- Ray Rogers — engineer, engineering support
- Doug Sax — mastering, max
- James Stroud — executive producer
- Tom Sweeney — mixing assistant
- Simon Tassano — recorder, engineer
- Dann Thompson — assistant engineer

== Charts ==
=== Weekly charts ===
Chart (1999)	Peak position
Canadian Country Albums (RPM)	7
US Billboard 200	75
US Top Country Albums (Billboard)	7

=== Year-end charts ===
Chart (2000)	Position
US Top Country Albums (Billboard)	22

=== Singles ===
Year	Single	Peak chart positions		
Year	Single	US Country	US	CAN Country
1999	"When I Said I Do" (with Lisa Hartman-Black)	1	31	1
2000	"Been There" (with Steve Wariner)	5	44	1
2000	"Love She Can't Live Without"	30	—	45
