= List of Hot Country Singles & Tracks number ones of 1995 =

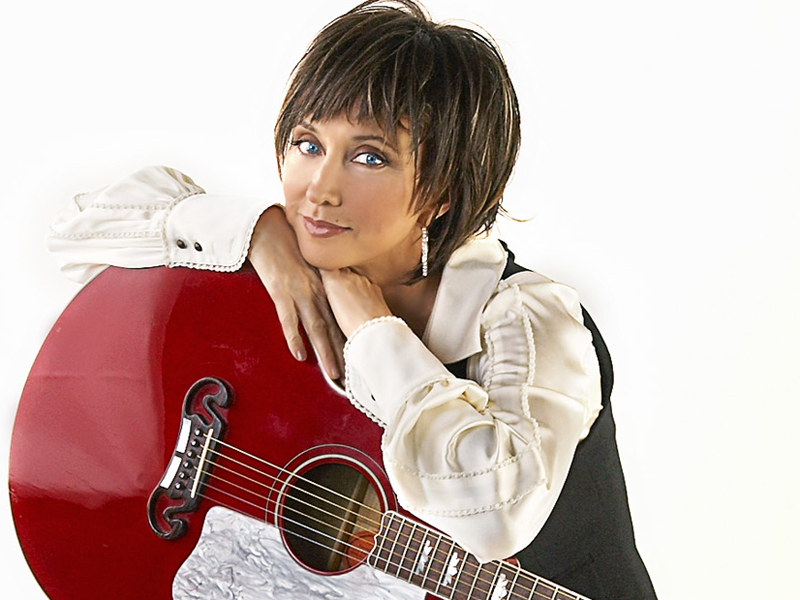
Pam Tillis achieved her only number one in 1995 with "Mi Vida Loca (My Crazy Life)".

Hot Country Songs is a chart that ranks the top-performing country music songs in the United States, published by Billboard magazine. In 1995, 29 different songs topped the chart, then published under the title Hot Country Singles & Tracks, in 52 issues of the magazine, based on weekly airplay data from country music radio stations compiled by Nielsen Broadcast Data Systems.

At the start of the year, the song at number one was "Pickup Man" by Joe Diffie, which had been in the top spot since the issue dated December 17, 1994. Alan Jackson was the only artist to achieve three number ones in 1995, topping the chart with "Gone Country", "I Don't Even Know Your Name" and "Tall, Tall Trees". Tim McGraw had the longest unbroken run in the top spot, spending five weeks at number one with "I Like It, I Love It", and the total of seven weeks which he spent at number one with that song and "Not a Moment Too Soon" was the highest by any artist. Brooks & Dunn, George Strait and John Michael Montgomery were the only other artists to achieve more than one number one in 1995.

Acts to achieve their first number one during the year included Bryan White with "Someone Else's Star", Jeff Carson with "Not on Your Love", Pam Tillis with "Mi Vida Loca (My Crazy Life)", Ty Herndon with "What Mattered Most", David Lee Murphy with "Dust on the Bottle", and Wade Hayes with "Old Enough to Know Better". Additionally, Canadian singer Shania Twain made her first appearance at number one in July with "Any Man of Mine". She would go on achieve stardom in both the country and pop markets, and become one of the most globally successful recording artists of the 1990s. The final number one of the year was "That's as Close as I'll Get to Loving You" by Aaron Tippin.

== Chart history ==
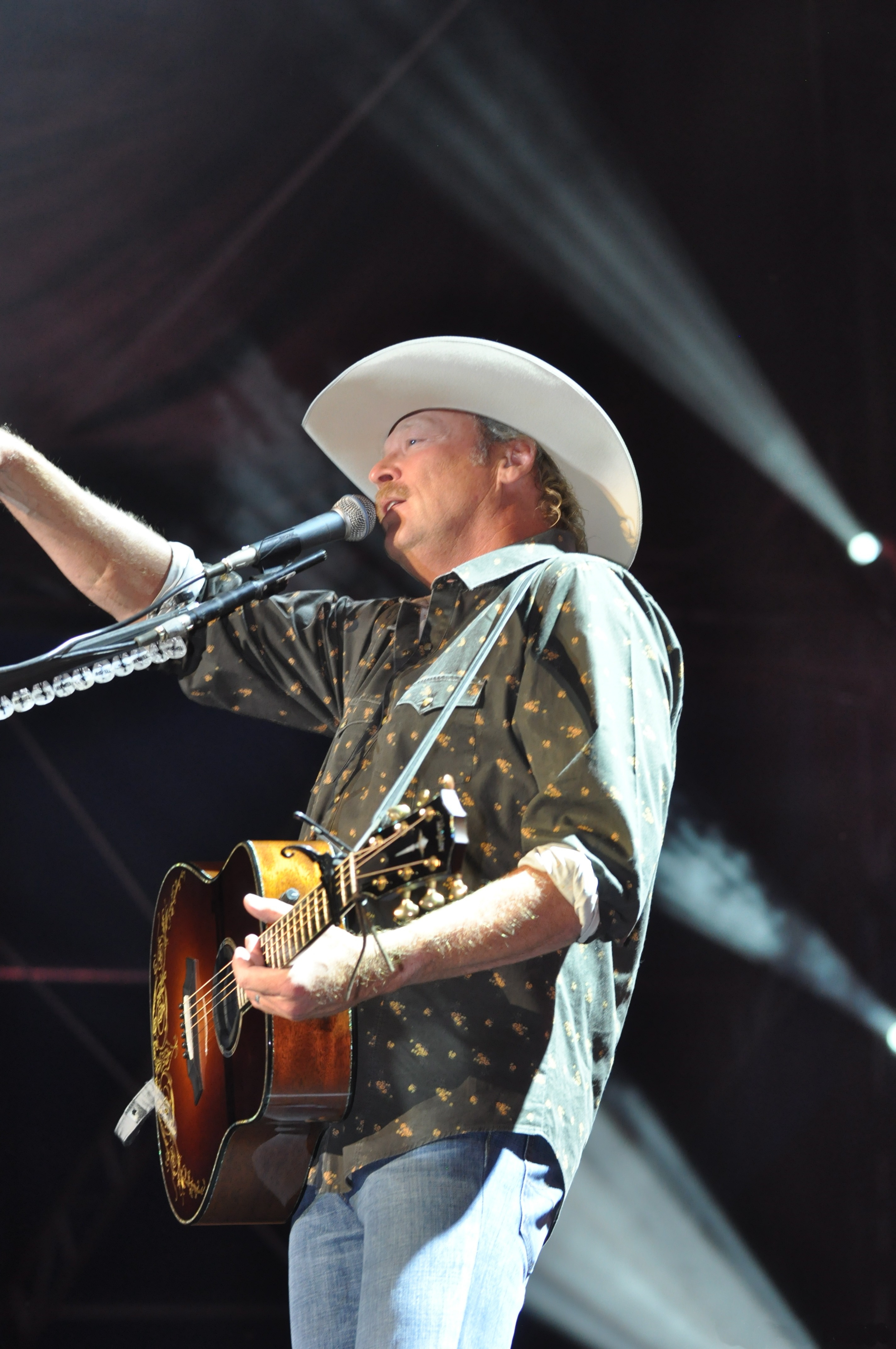
Alan Jackson was the only artist to take three different songs to number one in 1995.

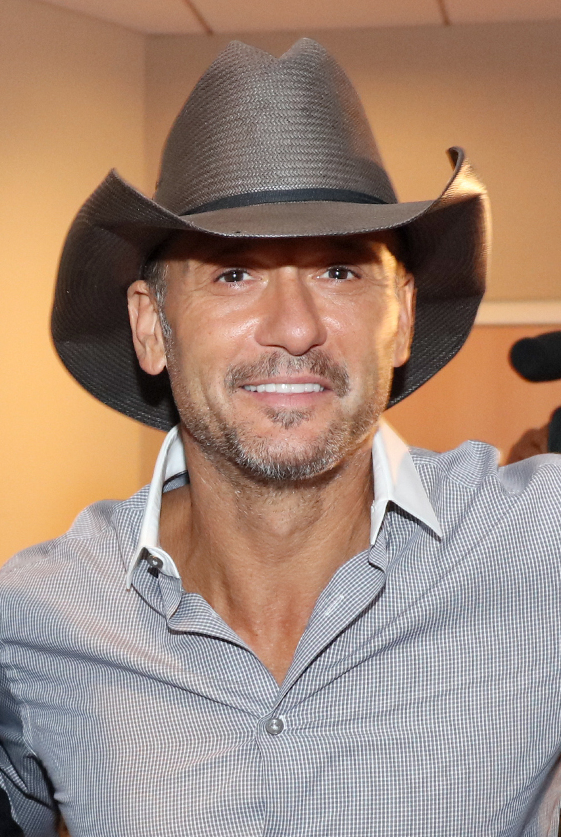
Tim McGraw spent seven weeks at number one during the year, the most by any artist.

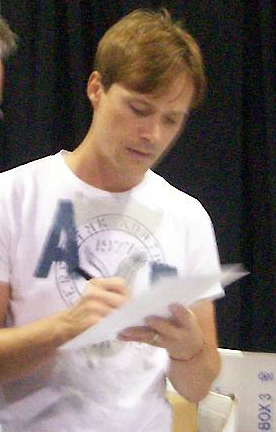
Bryan White gained his first number one in 1995.

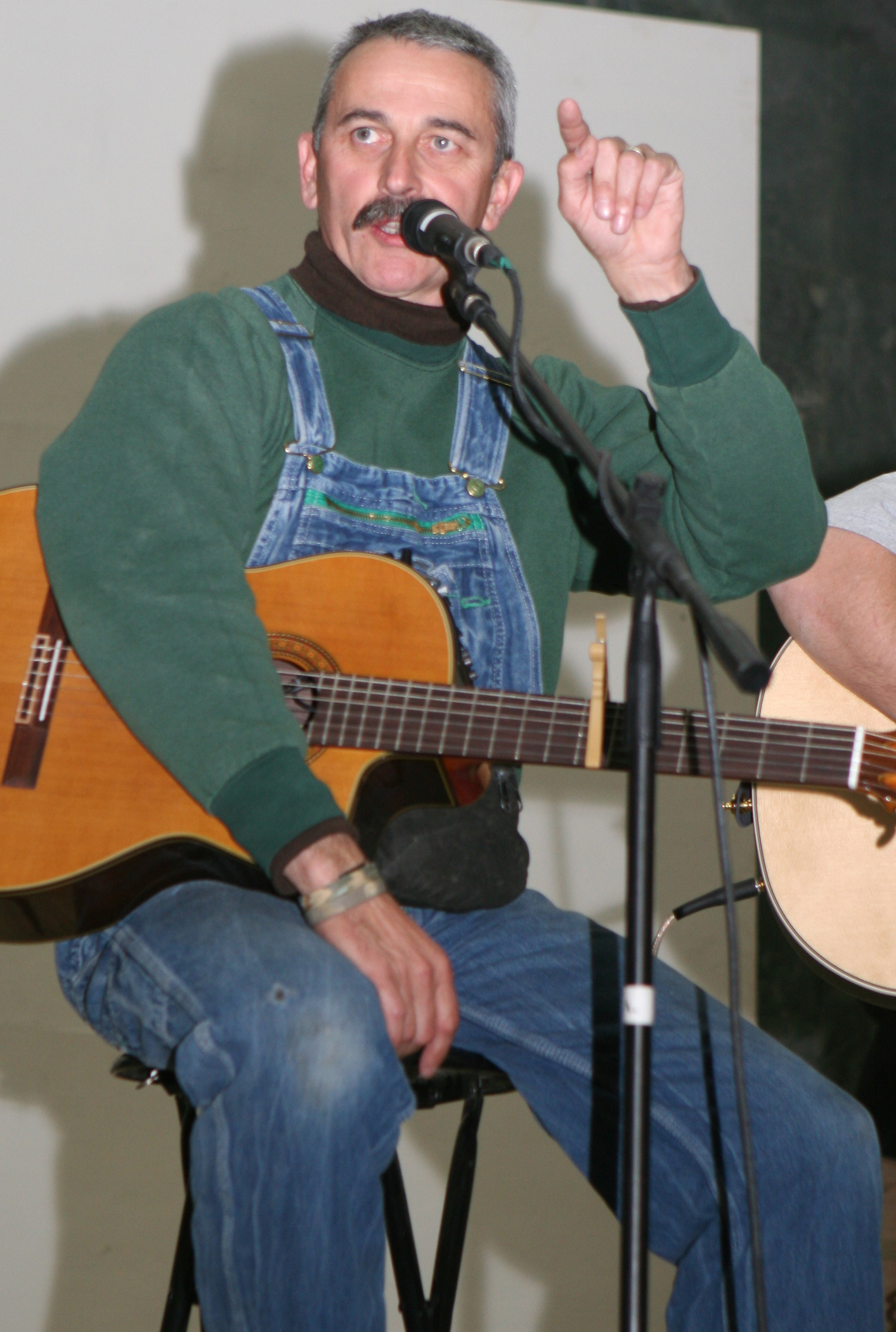
Aaron Tippin ended the year at number one.

Issue date	Title	Artist(s)	Ref.
January 7	"Pickup Man"	Joe Diffie	
January 14	"Not a Moment Too Soon"	Tim McGraw	
January 21	"Not a Moment Too Soon"	Tim McGraw	
January 28	"Gone Country"	Alan Jackson	
February 4	"Mi Vida Loca (My Crazy Life)"	Pam Tillis	
February 11	"Mi Vida Loca (My Crazy Life)"	Pam Tillis	
February 18	"My Kind of Girl"	Collin Raye	
February 25	"Old Enough to Know Better"	Wade Hayes	
March 4	"Old Enough to Know Better"	Wade Hayes	
March 11	"You Can't Make a Heart Love Somebody"	George Strait	
March 18	"This Woman and This Man"	Clay Walker	
March 25	"This Woman and This Man"	Clay Walker	
April 1	"Thinkin' About You"	Trisha Yearwood	
April 8	"Thinkin' About You"	Trisha Yearwood	
April 15	"The Heart Is a Lonely Hunter"	Reba McEntire	
April 22	"I Can Love You Like That"	John Michael Montgomery	
April 29	"Little Miss Honky Tonk"	Brooks & Dunn	
May 6	"I Can Love You Like That"	John Michael Montgomery	
May 13	"I Can Love You Like That"	John Michael Montgomery	
May 20	"Gonna Get a Life"	Mark Chesnutt	
May 27	"What Mattered Most"	Ty Herndon	
June 3	"Summer's Comin'"	Clint Black	
June 10	"Summer's Comin'"	Clint Black	
June 17	"Summer's Comin'"	Clint Black	
June 24	"Texas Tornado"	Tracy Lawrence	
July 1	"Sold (The Grundy County Auction Incident)"	John Michael Montgomery	
July 8	"Sold (The Grundy County Auction Incident)"	John Michael Montgomery	
July 15	"Sold (The Grundy County Auction Incident)"	John Michael Montgomery	
July 22	"Any Man of Mine"	Shania Twain	
July 29	"Any Man of Mine"	Shania Twain	
August 5	"I Don't Even Know Your Name"	Alan Jackson	
August 12	"I Didn't Know My Own Strength"	Lorrie Morgan	
August 19	"You're Gonna Miss Me When I'm Gone"	Brooks & Dunn	
August 26	"You're Gonna Miss Me When I'm Gone"	Brooks & Dunn	
September 2	"Not on Your Love"	Jeff Carson	
September 9	"Someone Else's Star"	Bryan White	
September 16	"I Like It, I Love It"	Tim McGraw	
September 23	"I Like It, I Love It"	Tim McGraw	
September 30	"I Like It, I Love It"	Tim McGraw	
October 7	"I Like It, I Love It"	Tim McGraw	
October 14	"I Like It, I Love It"	Tim McGraw	
October 21	"She's Every Woman"	Garth Brooks	
October 28	"Dust on the Bottle"	David Lee Murphy	
November 4	"Dust on the Bottle"	David Lee Murphy	
November 11	"Check Yes or No"	George Strait	
November 18	"Check Yes or No"	George Strait	
November 25	"Check Yes or No"	George Strait	
December 2	"Check Yes or No"	George Strait	
December 9	"Tall, Tall Trees"	Alan Jackson	
December 16	"Tall, Tall Trees"	Alan Jackson	
December 23	"That's as Close as I'll Get to Loving You"	Aaron Tippin	
December 30	"That's as Close as I'll Get to Loving You"	Aaron Tippin	

== See also ==
- 1995 in music
- List of artists who reached number one on the U.S. country chart
