= Cathy Geary Rush =

Cathy Geary
- Knots Landing character
- Portrayed by: Lisa Hartman Black
- Duration: 1983–1986
- First appearance: November 10, 1983 (Episode: Sacred Vows)
- Last appearance: May 15, 1986 (Episode: The Longest Night)
- Created by: David Jacobs
In-universe information
- Occupation: Singer at Isadora's; Ranch Hand at Westfork
- Siblings: Bonnie
- Spouse: Ray Geary (until 1984); Joshua Rush (1985)

Cathy Geary Rush is a fictional character from the CBS soap opera Knots Landing, a long-running serial about middle class life on the fictional cul-de-sac known as Seaview Circle in Los Angeles, California. She was played by actress and singer Lisa Hartman Black between 1983 and 1986. She debuted in the seventh episode of the fifth season. Hartman remained in the series until the final episode of the seventh season. Hartman had previously played another character, Ciji Dunne, during the fourth season.

== Creation ==
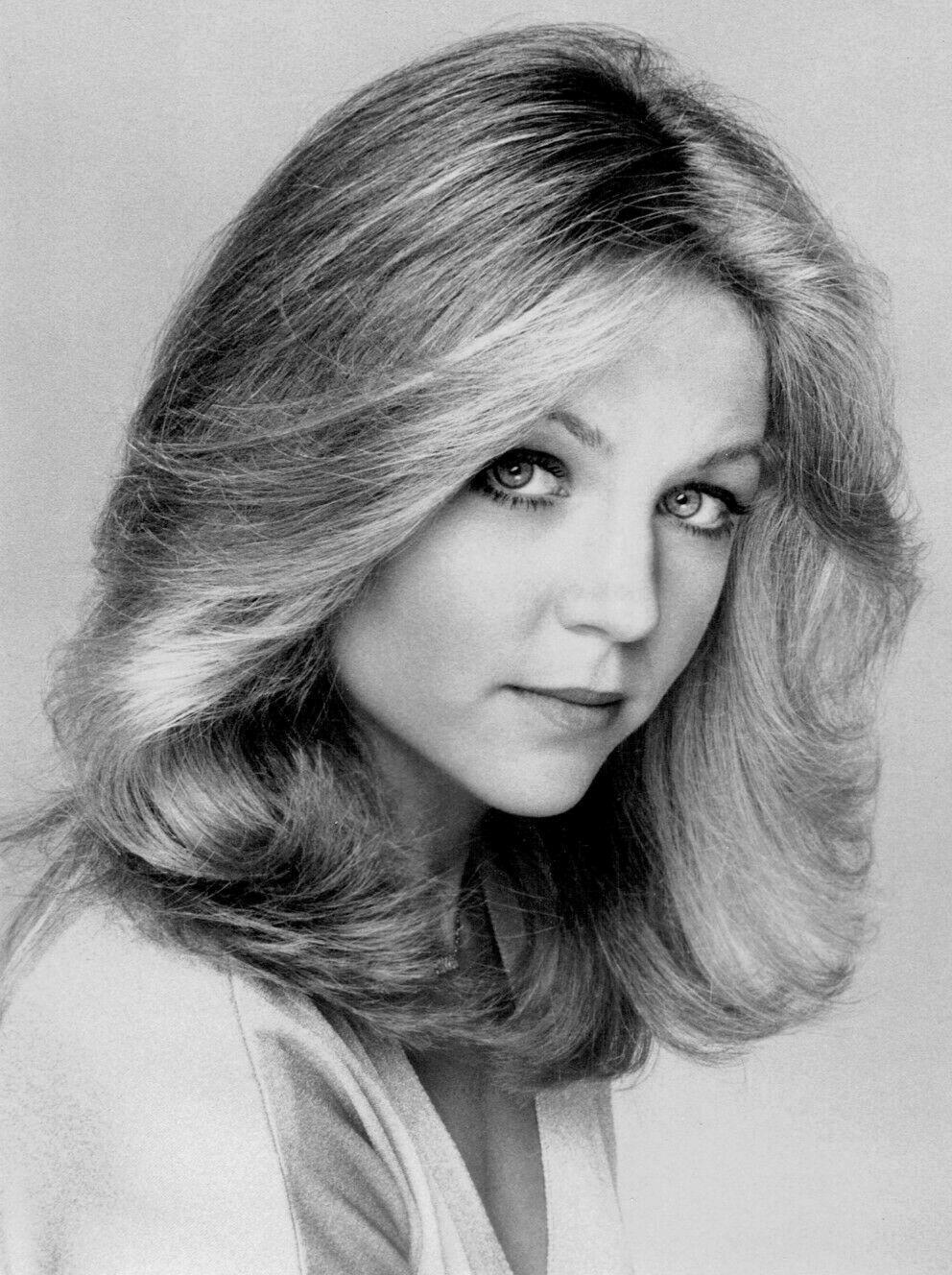
Lisa Hartman Black portrayed two characters in Knots Landing.

The character of Cathy Geary was created for Hartman after she appeared on the series' previous season as another character, Ciji Dunne. Ciji was killed off after only seventeen episodes but she proved to be popular as her death caused a huge amount of backlash from fans. The producers decided to bring Hartman back but as another character. Hartman recalls; "I was hired by one of the characters to drive her husband crazy because I looked so much like Ciji (the character who'd been murdered). At the end of that first season I'd gone on to do other stuff. When my manager called and said the producers wanted me back, that was the most flattering thing that ever happened to me".

Cathy Geary having the initials CG, was done as a pun on the Ciji name.

== Background ==
Cathy was born in Texas, and spent most of her childhood in Arkansas. As a teenager, she met and married Ray Geary. When Ray committed a serious crime that resulted in a man's death, Cathy agreed to take the blame and got convicted of second degree murder. Cathy got released after four years in jail due to her good behavior.

== Storylines ==
Soon after Cathy was paroled, she and her husband, Ray, agreed to a business deal with Abby Ewing. Abby was searching for a lookalike of the late Ciji Dunne, a dead singer who had had a strong friendship with Gary Ewing when she was alive. Cathy had a very strong resemblance to Ciji, and Abby wanted Cathy to distract Gary by impersonating Ciji as much as possible while Abby did business deals behind Gary's back. Cathy lied to Gary by claiming that she was from Wyoming, and also concealed her past prison record from Gary. Cathy eventually fell in love with Gary, while Gary told Cathy that he regretted that he and Ciji hadn't become lovers before Ciji died.

Meanwhile, Cathy unwittingly confronted Ciji’s murderer, Tony Fenice/Chip Roberts. Horribly believing that Cathy was in fact a resurrection of the very person he killed, Tony took a misstep and was fatally impaled by a pitchfork, forever ending his reign of terror.

Gary and Cathy's relationship soured quickly when the truth about her background and Abby's deal emerged. Cathy was tracked down by her husband Ray and she found herself being forced to rip off Gary. When Gary discovered Abby's shady business deals behind his back, he threw Abby off his ranch. However, he made up with Cathy and the two began an affair. Cathy then told Ray that their relationship was over. As Ray turned violent, had a fight with Gary, and later prowled around Gary's ranch, he was accidentally shot dead by the Wolfbridge Group, who thought that Ray was Gary. Later, Cathy became friends with Laura Avery and left the ranch to move in with her. During this time she began singing at Isadora's club. She then met the shy and religious Joshua Rush, and they started a volatile relationship. Joshua wanted to marry Cathy but his control over her gave her doubts, but she married him hoping this would change. Cathy realized things were worse and Joshua became very abusive and attempted to kill her and himself by jumping from a building. Instead Joshua fell to his death alone. Cathy began rebuilding her life and focused her singing career and eventually left Knots Landing to tour.
