= Christmas with You (Clint Black album) =

Studio album by Clint Black
- Released: September 14, 2004
- Genre: Country, Christmas
- Length: 40:16
- Label: Equity
- Producer: James Stroud, Clint Black (tracks 1–10), Clint Black (tracks 11 and 12)

Clint Black chronology
Spend My Time (2004)	Christmas with You (2004)	Drinkin' Songs and Other Logic (2005)

Professional ratings
Review scores
Source	Rating
About.com	link
Allmusic	link

Christmas with You is the tenth studio album by American country music singer Clint Black. It is a reissue of his first Christmas album, 1995's Looking for Christmas, with two newly recorded songs, "Christmas with You" and "Santa's Holiday Song".

== Track listing ==
All songs written by Clint Black/Hayden Nicholas except where noted.

No.	Title	Writer(s)	Length
1.	"The Finest Gift"		3:33
2.	"Under the Mistletoe"	Black	3:45
3.	"The Kid"	Black, Merle Haggard, Nicholas	3:20
4.	"The Coolest Pair"	Black	2:44
5.	"Looking for Christmas"	Black	3:48
6.	"Christmas for Every Boy and Girl"	Black	3:40
7.	"'Til Santa's Gone (Milk and Cookies)"	Black, Nicholas, Shake Russell	2:41
8.	"Slow as Christmas"		2:06
9.	"The Birth of the King"	Black	4:15
10.	"Looking for Christmas (Reprise)"	Black	1:32
11.	"Christmas with You"		4:29
12.	"Santa's Holiday Song"		4:23

== Personnel ==
- Sam Bacco - percussion
- Eddie Bayers - drums
- Clint Black - harmonica, lead vocals, background vocals
- Lily Pearl Black - spoken word
- Robbie Buchanan - keyboards, piano
- Lenny Castro - percussion
- Jerry Douglas - dobro
- Stuart Duncan - fiddle
- Pat Enright - acoustic guitar
- Dick Gay - drums
- Wes Hightower - background vocals
- Warren Hill - saxophone
- Dann Huff - electric guitar
- Ronn Huff - string arrangements, conductor
- Jeff Huskins - fiddle
- Wendell Kelley - trombone
- Abraham Laboriel - bass guitar
- Sam Levine - recorder
- Gene Libbea - bass fiddle
- The London Session Orchestra - strings
- Hayden Nicholas - acoustic guitar
- Alan O'Bryant - banjo
- Dean Parks - acoustic guitar
- Jeff Peterson - pedal steel guitar
- Thomas R. Peterson - clarinet, saxophone
- Tom Roady - percussion
- John Robinson - drums
- Ray Rogers - tenor banjo
- Matt Rollings - piano
- Leland Sklar - bass guitar
- Fred Tackett - acoustic guitar
- Russell Terrell - background vocals
- Lee Thornburg - trumpet
- George Tidewell - flugelhorn
- Cindy Richardson Walker - background vocals
- Roland White - mandolin
- Jake Willemain - bass guitar
- Gavyn Wright - string contractor
- Curtis Young - background vocals

== Chart performance ==
=== Album ===
Chart (2004)	Peak position
U.S. Billboard Top Country Albums	46
U.S. Billboard Independent Albums	24

=== Singles ===
Year	Single	US Country
2005	"Christmas with You"	54
