= Drinkin' Songs and Other Logic =

Studio album by Clint Black
- Released: October 4, 2005
- Genre: Country
- Length: 39:01
- Label: Equity
- Producer: Clint Black

Clint Black chronology
Christmas with You (2004)	Drinkin' Songs and Other Logic (2005)	16 Biggest Hits (2006)

Singles from Drinkin' Songs and Other Logic
- 1. "Rainbow in the Rain" Released: June 6, 2005; 2. "Code of the West" Released: September 5, 2005; 3. "Drinkin' Songs and Other Logic" Released: January 2006; 4. "Heartaches" Released: June 5, 2006

Professional ratings
Review scores
Source	Rating
About.com	4/5 stars
AllMusic	4/5 stars
Entertainment Weekly	B

Drinkin' Songs and Other Logic is the eleventh studio album by country singer Clint Black. The album was released on October 4, 2005. He describes it as a "barroom, honky-tonk kind of album" with songs "about drinking, good for drinking, or written while drinking". The tracks "Rainbow in the Rain", "Code of the West", "Drinkin' Songs and Other Logic" and "Heartaches" were all released as singles. Kimberly Roads and Jimi Westbrook of the group Little Big Town are featured on this album as background vocalists.

== Track listing ==
All songs written by Clint Black and Hayden Nicholas except where noted.

No.	Title	Writer(s)	Length
1.	"Drinkin' Songs and Other Logic"	Black, Nicholas, Steve Wariner	3:17
2.	"Heartaches"	Black	3:26
3.	"Code of the West"		3:43
4.	"Rainbow in the Rain"		2:22
5.	"Undercover Cowboy"	Black	3:48
6.	"Go It Alone"		3:31
7.	"Too Much Rock"		3:01
8.	"A Big One"	Black, Tim Nichols	2:57
9.	"I Don't Wanna Tell You"		3:12
10.	"Back Home in Heaven"		3:35
11.	"Thinkin' of You"	Black	3:07
12.	"Longnecks and Rednecks"		3:02

== Personnel ==
=== Band ===
- Clint Black — acoustic guitar, harmonica, percussion, electric guitar, lead vocals, background vocals
- Dane Bryant — piano, background vocals, Fender Rhodes
- Dick Gay — drums
- Hayden Nicholas — electric guitar, baritone guitar
- Jeff Peterson — Dobro, steel guitar
- Steve Real — background vocals
- Kimberly Roads — background vocals
- Steve Wariner — electric guitar
- Jimi Westbrook — background vocals
- Jake Willemain — bass guitar
- Martin Young — acoustic guitar

=== Production ===
- Clint Black — producer
- Zack Berry — production coordinator
- Ricky Cobble — engineer, mixing
- Ray Rogers — engineering support
- Steve Lockhart — technical support
- Hank Williams — mastering

== Chart positions ==
From Billboard.

=== Album ===
Year	Chart	Position
2005	Top Country Albums	36
2005	Top Independent Albums	22

=== Singles ===
Year	Single	Peak positions	
Year	Single	US Country	US
2005	"Rainbow in the Rain"	44	—
2005	"Code of the West"	—	—
2006	"Drinkin' Songs and Other Logic"	54	—
2006	"Heartaches"	—	—
