= Maverick (film) =

1994 film by Richard Donner

- Theatrical release poster
- Directed by: Richard Donner
- Screenplay by: William Goldman
- Based on: Maverick (1957 TV series) by Roy Huggins
- Produced by: Bruce Davey; Richard Donner
- Starring: Mel Gibson; Jodie Foster; James Garner; Graham Greene; James Coburn; Alfred Molina
- Cinematography: Vilmos Zsigmond
- Edited by: Stuart Baird; Mike Kelly
- Music by: Randy Newman
- Production companies: Icon Productions; Donner/Shuler-Donner Productions
- Distributed by: Warner Bros.
- Release date: May 20, 1994
- Running time: 127 minutes
- Country: United States
- Language: English
- Budget: $75 million
- Box office: $183 million

Maverick is a 1994 American Western comedy film directed by Richard Donner, written by William Goldman, and starring Mel Gibson, Jodie Foster, and James Garner. The film, based on the 1957–1962 television series of the same name created by Roy Huggins and originally starring Garner, stars Gibson as Bret Maverick, a card player and con artist who collects money to enter a high-stakes poker game. He is joined in his adventure by Annabelle Bransford (Foster), another con artist, and Marshal Zane Cooper (Garner), a lawman. The supporting cast features Graham Greene, James Coburn, and Alfred Molina, and many cameo appearances by Western film actors, country music stars, and other actors.

Maverick was filmed from August to December 1993. Released theatrically by Warner Bros. on May 20, 1994, the film was both a critical and commercial success, grossing $183 million worldwide against a $75 million budget. It was nominated for an Academy Award for Best Costume Design.

== Plot ==
In the American Old West, card sharp and con artist Bret Maverick is en route to a major five-card draw poker tournament held aboard the paddle steamer Lauren Belle, intending to determine how skilled a poker player he really is. Short $3,000 of the $25,000 entry fee, Maverick travels to the town of Crystal River to collect debts and win money through poker. During one game, he encounters young con artist Annabelle Bransford and defeats the ill-tempered gambler, Angel.

Maverick and Bransford share a stagecoach with Marshal Zane Cooper, and together the three leave Crystal River. They narrowly escape plunging into a ravine after their elderly driver suddenly dies, then aid a group of missionary settlers by recovering their stolen money from a gang of bandits. Maverick is rewarded with a share of the money, but feels guilty and returns it, much to Bransford's ire. The group is then cornered by a band of Indians led by Joseph, who is secretly a friend of Maverick's. Maverick feigns sacrificing himself to allow the others to escape. He later learns Joseph does not have the $1,000 he owes him, so they swindle a Russian archduke out of the money by staging a hunt in which the archduke believes he is killing an Indian—Maverick in disguise.

Meanwhile, Angel receives a telegram instructing him to prevent Maverick from reaching the tournament. He and his men capture Maverick and leave him hanging from a tree above a nest of rattlesnakes. After they leave, Maverick is saved when the branch breaks. Still $2,000 short, he boards the Lauren Belle and finds Bransford, who is herself $4,000 short. Spotting the archduke aboard, Maverick poses as a Bureau of Indian Affairs agent investigating the shooting of Indians for sport and cons the archduke out of $6,000, covering both their entry fees.

Commodore Duvall welcomes the competitors to the tournament. Cooper oversees security for both the game and the $500,000 prize money, (Note: The $500,000 prize is approximately equivalent to $19.4 million in 2025.) confiscating weapons and watching for cheaters, who will be immediately disqualified and thrown overboard if discovered. The field is gradually reduced until only Maverick, Angel, Bransford, and Duvall remain for the winner-take-all final.

During a break in the tournament, Maverick and Bransford have a tryst. As the game approaches, Maverick discovers he has been locked in his room in an attempt to force his forfeit, but he climbs along the outside of the steamer and reaches the table in time. After Bransford is eliminated, Maverick notices the dealer conspiring with Angel by bottom dealing cards. Rather than replace the dealer, Maverick has Angel deal him a card from the top of the deck. All three remaining players wager their remaining chips, and Angel and Duvall reveal strong hands. Maverick refuses to look at his final card, relying on his long-held belief that, when he truly needs it, he can summon the card he wants. He reveals the Ace of spades, completing an unbeatable royal flush. Angel and his men draw their guns, but Cooper and Maverick shoot first, killing them.

During the closing ceremony, Cooper steals the prize money and escapes. Later that night, he secretly meets Duvall, revealing they had conspired to steal the money together and that Angel had been working for Duvall. Duvall attempts to betray Cooper, but Maverick intervenes, recovers the money, and leaves, while Cooper subdues Duvall.

Some time later, Cooper corners Maverick while he is enjoying a hot bath; Cooper is revealed to be Maverick's accomplice and father, Bret Maverick Sr.. As the two relax in adjoining baths, Bransford arrives, having deduced their relationship from their similar physiques and mannerisms. She steals the satchel containing the prize money and departs, after which Maverick reveals that he hid half the money in his boots. He remarks that retrieving the remaining $250,000 will be "fun". When Maverick Sr. asks how Maverick drew the Ace of spades, Maverick replies, "Magic", and smiles.

== Cast ==
- Mel Gibson as Bret Maverick
- Jodie Foster as Annabelle Bransford
- James Garner as Zane Cooper
- Graham Greene as Joseph
- Alfred Molina as Angel
- James Coburn as Commodore Duvall
- Dub Taylor as Room Clerk
- Dan Hedaya as Twitchy
- Paul L. Smith as Archduke
- Geoffrey Lewis as Matthew Wicker / Eugene
- Max Perlich as John Wesley Hardin

Various Western actors make cameo appearances in the film, as well as people who have formerly worked with Donner, Gibson, Foster, or Garner, and other celebrities, including Danny Glover (uncredited), Hal Ketchum, and Corey Feldman as bank robbers; Read Morgan and Steve Kahan as card dealers; Art LaFleur and Leo Gordon as poker players at Maverick's first game; Paul Brinegar as the stagecoach driver; Denver Pyle as a cheating old gambler; Robert Fuller, Doug McClure, Henry Darrow, William Smith, Michael Paul Chan, and Charles Dierkop as riverboat poker players; William Marshall as a riverboat poker player defeated by Angel; Dennis Fimple as Stuttering, a player beaten by the Commodore; Bert Remsen as an elderly riverboat gambler beaten by Maverick; and Margot Kidder as missionary Margaret Mary, colleague of missionary Mary Margaret, in an uncredited appearance. Additional cameos cut from the film included Alice Cooper as the town drunk, Linda Hunt as a magician, and Clint Walker as a sheriff.

Leo Gordon had played a semiregular supporting character in seasons one and two of the original Maverick television show, gambler Big Mike McComb. Gordon also later wrote a few episodes of the show. Margot Kidder had been Garner's co-star and onscreen love interest in the short-lived Western television series Nichols, reflected in their meeting in Maverick when her character quickly hints that his character might want to marry her. Danny Glover's cameo appearance references Donner's Lethal Weapon film series starring Glover and Gibson as cop partners. Their meeting in Maverick has them share a moment of recognition, complete with Lethal Weapon music, and as he leaves, Glover says Roger Murtaugh's catchphrase: "I'm too old for this shit."

Various country music singers also cameo, including Carlene Carter as a waitress, Waylon Jennings and Kathy Mattea as a gambling couple with concealed guns, Reba McEntire as a spectator in the opening poker game, Clint Black as a sweet-faced gambler thrown overboard for cheating, and Vince Gill and his then-wife Janis Gill as spectators.

== Production ==
=== Development ===
In Five Screenplays with Essays, Goldman describes an earlier version of the script, in which Maverick explains he has a magic ability to call the card he needs out of the deck. Although he is not able to do so successfully, the old hermit for whom he attempts to demonstrate it tells him that he really does have the magic in him. The scene was shot with Linda Hunt playing the hermit, but editors felt it did not work in the context of the rest of the movie, so was cut.

Garner wrote in his memoirs that Richard Donner originally wanted Paul Newman to play Zane Cooper, but Newman was not interested.

=== Filming ===
Principal photography began on August 16, 1993, and concluded on December 10. Parts of the film were shot at Lake Powell and Warm Creek in Utah. Other filming locations include Lee's Ferry and Marble Canyon in Arizona, Lone Pine, Manzanar, Big Pine, and Yosemite National Park in California, and Columbia River Gorge in Oregon.

=== Vehicles ===
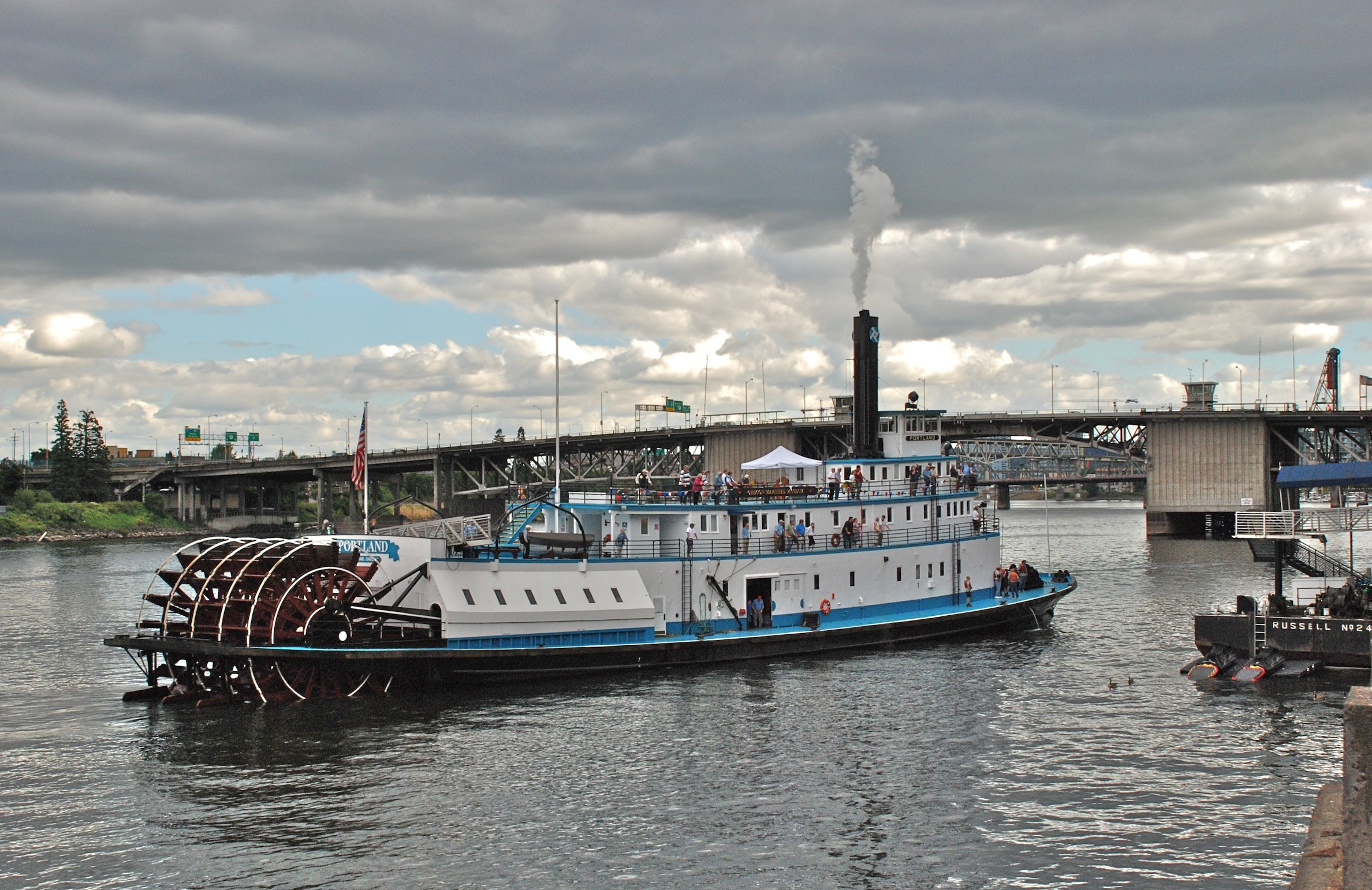
The Portland was used in the film as the steamboat Lauren Belle in the film.

The steamboat used in the film—dubbed the Lauren Belle—was the Portland, the last remaining sternwheel tugboat in the United States. At the time, it belonged to the Oregon Maritime Museum in Portland. Over several weeks, the boat was decorated to alter its appearance to resemble a Mississippi-style gambling boat, including the addition of two decorative chimneys. In August 1993, the production requested permission to film scenes of the riverboat along the Columbia River in Washington. The artificial smoke released by the boat's chimney was considered to violate air-quality laws in Washington and Oregon and required approval for the scenes before their scheduled filming date in September 1993. After filming concluded, the decorations were removed and the boat was returned to its original state.

=== Soundtrack ===
The soundtrack featured three chart singles: "Renegades, Rebels and Rogues" by Tracy Lawrence, "A Good Run of Bad Luck" by Clint Black (which also appeared on his album No Time to Kill), and "Something Already Gone" by Carlene Carter. Also included on the album was an all-star rendition of "Amazing Grace", from which all royalties were donated to the Elizabeth Glaser Pediatric AIDS Foundation.

== Reception ==
=== Box office ===
Maverick earned $101,631,272 (55.5%) in North America and $81,400,000 (44.5%) elsewhere for a worldwide total of $183,031,272. This made it the 12th-highest-grossing film in North America and the 15th-highest-grossing film worldwide of 1994. As of 2013, the film is the sixth-highest-grossing Western film in North America.

Prerelease tracking showed that the film would open strongly. During its opening weekend in North America, Maverick earned $17.2 million from 2,537 theaters – an average of $6,798 per theater – ranking as the number-one film of the weekend, and took a total of $41.8 million over its first two weeks of release.

=== Critical response ===
Maverick has received generally favorable reviews. On Rotten Tomatoes the film has a 67% rating based on reviews from 55 critics, with an average rating of 5.9/10. The site's consensus states: "It isn't terribly deep, but it's witty and undeniably charming, and the cast is obviously having fun." On Metacritic it has a score of 62% based on reviews from 28 critics, indicating "generally favorable reviews". Audiences surveyed by CinemaScore gave the film a grade A− on scale of A to F.

James Berardinelli, from reelviews.net, gave the film three and a half stars out of four. He stated, "The strength of Maverick is the ease with which it switches from comedy to action, and back again....it's refreshing to find something that satisfies expectations." Reviewing it for the Chicago Sun-Times, Roger Ebert gave the film three stars out of four, writing that the film is "the first lighthearted, laugh-oriented family Western in a long time, and one of the nice things about it is, it doesn't feel the need to justify its existence. It acts like it's the most natural thing in the world to be a Western."

== Other media ==
In September 1994, Data East pinball released a pinball machine based on the film. The backglass featured the likeness of Mel Gibson, Jodie Foster, and other stars of the film. The game was the last to be released under the Data East name, with the company being sold to Sega and rebranded as Sega Pinball near the end of the game's production. As a result of this, a small number of Sega-branded Maverick machines are known to exist.
