= Nothin' but the Taillights =

Studio album by Clint Black
- Released: July 29, 1997
- Recorded: 1996–1997
- Genre: Neotraditional country
- Length: 46:22
- Label: RCA Nashville
- Producer: James Stroud, Clint Black

Clint Black chronology
Looking for Christmas (1995)	Nothin' but the Taillights (1997)	D'lectrified (1999)

Singles from Nothin' but the Taillights
- 1. "Still Holding On" Released: June 2, 1997; 2. "Something That We Do" Released: August 25, 1997; 3. "Nothin' but the Taillights" Released: January 27, 1998; 4. "The Shoes You're Wearing" Released: April 13, 1998; 5. "Loosen Up My Strings" Released: August 24, 1998; 6. "You Don't Need Me Now" Released: January 30, 1999

Professional ratings
Review scores
Source	Rating
Allmusic	link
Chicago Tribune	link
Entertainment Weekly	C+ link
Los Angeles Times	link

Nothin' but the Taillights is the seventh studio album by American country music singer Clint Black. Black co-wrote many of the songs with others and played much of the guitar himself for this album.

"Something That We Do", "Nothin' but the Taillights", and "The Shoes You're Wearing" were hit singles. The latter two of those three songs reached #1. The album is currently certified platinum by the RIAA.

"Still Holding On" was co-written with Matraca Berg and Marty Stuart and performed as a duet with Martina McBride. This song was also included on McBride's Evolution album, also released in 1997.

"Ode To Chet" is an ode to guitar player Chet Atkins and features Steve Wariner, Larry Carlton, Dann Huff, Hayden Nicholas, Mark Knopfler, and Atkins and Black themselves on guitar.

== Musical style and composition ==
Nothin' but the Taillights has been described as a neotraditional country album, with elements of bluegrass.

== Track listing ==
No.	Title	Writer(s)	Length
1.	"Nothin' but the Taillights"	Black, Steve Wariner	3:50
2.	"That Something in My Life"	Black, Kostas	2:52
3.	"Our Kind of Love" (Alison Krauss and Union Station)	Black, Shake Russell	4:09
4.	"Loosen Up My Strings"	Black, Hayden Nicholas	3:30
5.	"Still Holding On" (Duet with Martina McBride)	Black, Matraca Berg, Marty Stuart	4:37
6.	"Something That We Do"	Black, Skip Ewing	3:57
7.	"The Shoes You're Wearing"	Black, Nicholas	3:29
8.	"You Don't Need Me Now"	Black, Russell	3:42
9.	"What I Feel Inside"	Black, Nicholas	4:30
10.	"You Know It All"	Black, Wariner	4:17
11.	"Ode to Chet" (With Chet Atkins, Steve Wariner, Larry Carlton, Dann Huff, and Mark Knopfler)	Black, Nicholas	3:13
12.	"Bitter Side of Sweet"	Black, Nicholas	4:28

== Personnel ==
=== Band ===
- Clint Black — acoustic guitar, harmonica, electric guitar, lead vocals, background vocals
- Chet Atkins — electric guitar on "Ode To Chet"
- Barry Bales — acoustic bass on "Our Kind of Love"
- Eddie Bayers — drums
- Ron Block – acoustic guitar on "Our Kind of Love"
- Mike Brignardello — bass guitar
- Robbie Buchanan — piano, keyboards
- Larry Byrom — acoustic guitar
- Larry Carlton — electric guitar on "Ode To Chet"
- Stuart Duncan — fiddle, mandolin
- Skip Ewing — acoustic guitar
- Paul Franklin — steel guitar
- Dann Huff — electric guitar on "Ode To Chet"
- Mark Knopfler — electric guitar on "Ode To Chet"
- Alison Krauss — fiddle, viola, and background vocals on "Our Kind of Love"
- The London Session Orchestra — strings
- Martina McBride — duet vocals on "Still Holding On"
- Hayden Nicholas — electric guitar
- Dean Parks — acoustic guitar
- Steve Real — background vocals
- Michael Rhodes — bass guitar
- John Robinson — drums
- Matt Rollings — piano
- Leland Sklar — bass guitar
- Adam Steffey — mandolin on "Our Kind of Love"
- Fred Tackett — acoustic guitar
- Dan Tyminski — acoustic guitar and background vocals on "Our Kind of Love"
- Julianna Waller — fiddle
- Steve Wariner — electric guitar on "Ode To Chet"

=== Production ===
- Clint Black — producer
- James Stroud — producer
- Kevin Beamish — engineer
- Ricky Cobble — assistant engineer, mixing assistant
- Mark Hagen — assistant engineer
- Richard Hanson — assistant engineer
- Ronn Huff — arranger, conductor
- Julian King — engineer, mixing
- Pete Martinez — assistant engineer
- Glenn Meadows — mastering
- Patrick Murphy — assistant engineer
- John Nelson — assistant engineer
- Gary Paczosa — engineer
- Ray Rogers — assistant engineer
- Craig White — mixing assistant

== Charts ==
=== Weekly charts ===
Chart (1997)	Peak position
Canadian Country Albums (RPM)	5
US Billboard 200	43
US Top Country Albums (Billboard)	4

=== Year-end charts ===
Chart (1997)	Position
US Top Country Albums (Billboard)	40
Chart (1998)	Position
US Top Country Albums (Billboard)	25

=== Singles ===
Year	Single	Peak chart positions			
Year	Single	US Country	US	CAN Country	CAN AC
1997	"Still Holding On" (with Martina McBride)	11	—	1	50
1997	"Something That We Do"	2	67	4	—
1998	"Nothin' but the Taillights"	1	116	1	—
1998	"The Shoes You're Wearing"	1	118	1	—
1998	"Loosen Up My Strings"	12	—	6	—
1999	"You Don't Need Me Now"	29	—	31	—
