= Loosen Up My Strings =

Single by Clint Black

from the album Nothin' But the Taillights
- B-side: "The Shoes You're Wearing"
- Released: August 24, 1998
- Recorded: 1997
- Genre: Country
- Length: 3:30
- Label: RCA Nashville
- Songwriters: Clint Black; Hayden Nicholas
- Producers: James Stroud; Clint Black

Clint Black singles chronology
"The Shoes You're Wearing" (1998)	"Loosen Up My Strings" (1998)	"You Don't Need Me Now" (1999)

"Loosen Up My Strings" is a song co-written and recorded by American country music artist Clint Black. It was released in August 1998 as the fifth single from his album Nothin' but the Taillights. It peaked at #12 in the United States, and #6 in Canada. The song was written by Black and Hayden Nicholas.

== Content ==
The song is a blue-collar lyric about leaving the 9-to-5 work cycle and having fun.

== Charts ==
"Loosen Up My Strings" debuted at number 57 on the U.S. Billboard Hot Country Singles & Tracks for the week of August 15, 1998. It was his second single to miss the Top 10 on the Hot Country Singles & Tracks Chart.

Chart (1998)	Peak position
Canada Country Singles (RPM)	6
US Hot Country Songs (Billboard)	12

=== Year-end charts ===
Chart (1998)	Position
Canada Country Tracks (RPM)	67
