= You Don't Need Me Now =

Single by Clint Black

from the album Nothin' but the Taillights
- Released: January 30, 1999
- Genre: Country
- Length: 3:42
- Label: RCA Nashville
- Songwriter(s): Clint Black, Shake Russell
- Producer(s): Clint Black, James Stroud

Clint Black singles chronology
"Loosen Up My Strings" (1998)	"You Don't Need Me Now" (1999)	"When I Said I Do" (1999)

"You Don't Need Me Now" is a song co-written and recorded by American country music artist Clint Black. It was released in January 1999 as the fifth and final single from the album Nothin' but the Taillights. The song reached #29 on the Billboard Hot Country Singles & Tracks chart. The song was written by Black and Shake Russell. It was first single to fail reaching the Top 20 on the Hot Country Singles & Tracks Chart.

== Chart performance ==
Chart (1999)	Peak position
US Hot Country Songs (Billboard)	29
Canadian RPM Country Tracks	31
