= Love She Can't Live Without =

Single by Clint Black

from the album D'lectrified
- B-side: "Galaxy Song"
- Released: June 24, 2000
- Genre: Country
- Length: 3:41
- Label: RCA Nashville
- Songwriter(s): Clint Black, Skip Ewing
- Producer(s): Clint Black

Clint Black singles chronology
"Been There" (2000)	"Love She Can't Live Without" (2000)	"Easy for Me to Say" (2001)

"Love She Can't Live Without" is song co-written and recorded by American country music artist Clint Black. It was released in June 2000 as the third single from the album D'lectrified. The song reached #30 on the Billboard Hot Country Singles & Tracks chart. The song was written by Black and Skip Ewing.

== Charts ==
Chart (2000)	Peak position
US Hot Country Songs (Billboard)	30
Canadian RPM Country Tracks	45
