= No Time to Kill =

Studio album by Clint Black
- Released: July 13, 1993
- Recorded: Westlake (Los Angeles, California); Masterfonics (Nashville, Tennessee); Mesa Recording (Nashville, Tennessee)
- Genre: Country
- Length: 32:25
- Label: RCA Nashville
- Producer: James Stroud, Clint Black

Clint Black chronology
The Hard Way (1992)	No Time to Kill (1993)	One Emotion (1994)

Singles from No Time to Kill
- 1. "A Bad Goodbye" Released: May 3, 1993; 2. "No Time to Kill" Released: August 2, 1993; 3. "State of Mind" Released: November 15, 1993; 4. "A Good Run of Bad Luck" Released: February 28, 1994; 5. "Half the Man" Released: May 30, 1994

No Time to Kill is the fourth studio album by American country music singer-songwriter Clint Black. The title is a play on the title of his debut album, Killin' Time.

All Five singles from the album were top ten hits for Black on the Billboard Hot Country Singles & Tracks charts: the title track hit #3; "A Bad Goodbye" (a duet with Wynonna Judd recorded after they toured together for 1993's "Black and Wy" concert tour), hit #2; "State of Mind" also hit #2; "A Good Run of Bad Luck" was a #1 single that was featured in the 1994 film Maverick; and "Half the Man" hit #4. "Tuckered Out" also reached #74 based on unsolicited airplay. No Time to Kill was also Black's fourth consecutive album to be certified at least platinum by the RIAA.

Professional ratings
Review scores
Source	Rating
AllMusic	3/5 stars
Entertainment Weekly	C+

== Track listing ==
All tracks are written by Clint Black and Hayden Nicholas, except where noted.

No.	Title	Writer(s)	Length
1.	"No Time to Kill"		3:59
2.	"Thinkin' Again"		3:03
3.	"A Good Run of Bad Luck"		2:42
4.	"State of Mind"	Black	3:53
5.	"A Bad Goodbye" (Duet with Wynonna)	Black	3:39
6.	"Back to Back"		2:44
7.	"Half the Man"		3:00
8.	"I'll Take Texas"		2:40
9.	"Happiness Alone" (Omitted from cassette version.)	Black, Jimmy Buffett	3:11
10.	"Tuckered Out"		3:37

== Personnel ==
- Eddie Bayers - drums
- Clint Black - lead vocals, background vocals, harmonica
- Dane Bryant - piano
- Larry Byrom - acoustic guitar
- Lenny Castro - percussion
- Larry Corbett - cello
- Brian Dembow - viola
- Steve Dorff - string arrangements
- Bonnie Douglas - violin
- Jerry Douglas - Dobro
- Stuart Duncan - fiddle
- Paul Franklin - steel guitar
- Tommy Funderbunk - background vocals
- Berj Garabedian - violin
- James Getzoff - violin
- Ed Greene - drums
- Rob Hajacos - fiddle
- Dann Huff - electric guitar
- Wynonna Judd - duet vocals on "A Bad Goodbye"
- Dennis Karmazyn - cello
- Jan Kelley - cello
- Ezra Kliger - violin
- Brian Leonard - violin
- Kenny Loggins - background vocals
- Loy Lyle - violin
- Buell Neidlinger - upright bass
- Maria Newman - violin
- Hayden Nicholas - acoustic guitar
- Barbara Porter - violin
- Steve Real - background vocals
- Matt Rollings - piano
- Timothy B. Schmit - background vocals
- Harry Shirinian - viola
- Harry Shlutz - cello
- Paul Shure - violin
- Leland Sklar - bass guitar
- Spiro Stamos - violin
- Raymond Tischer - viola
- John Wittenberg - violin
- Glenn Worf - bass guitar
- Tibor Zelig - violin
- Mihail Zinovyev - viola

== Charts ==
=== Weekly charts ===
Chart (1993)	Peak position
Canadian Albums (RPM)	59
Canadian Country Albums (RPM)	3
US Billboard 200	14
US Top Country Albums (Billboard)	2

=== Year-end charts ===
Chart (1993)	Position
US Top Country Albums (Billboard)	31
Chart (1994)	Position
US Top Country Albums (Billboard)	22

=== Singles ===
Year	Single	Peak chart positions		
Year	Single	US Country	US	CAN Country
1993	"A Bad Goodbye" (with Wynonna Judd)	2	43	1
1993	"No Time to Kill"	3	-	2
1993	"State of Mind"	2	102	2
1994	"A Good Run of Bad Luck"	1	-	1
1994	"Half the Man"	4	-	5

=== Other charted songs ===
Year	Single	Peak positions
Year	Single	US Country
1994	"Tuckered Out"	74
