= One Emotion =

Studio album by Clint Black
- Released: October 4, 1994
- Studios: Lighthouse Recorders, Los Angeles, CA, Loud Recording Studio, Nashville, TN
- Genre: Country
- Length: 31:40
- Label: RCA Nashville
- Producers: James Stroud, Clint Black

Clint Black chronology
No Time to Kill (1993)	One Emotion (1994)	Looking for Christmas (1995)

Singles from One Emotion
- 1. "Untanglin' My Mind" Released: September 1994; 2. "Wherever You Go" Released: January 2, 1995; 3. "Summer's Comin'" Released: March 27, 1995; 4. "One Emotion" Released: July 3, 1995; 5. "Life Gets Away" Released: October 9, 1995

Professional ratings
Review scores
Source	Rating
Allmusic	link
Chicago Tribune	link
Entertainment Weekly	C+ link
Q	link

One Emotion is the fifth studio album by American country music singer-songwriter Clint Black, released on October 4, 1994. Its five singles reached the heights of the Billboard Hot Country Songs charts: "Untanglin' My Mind" at #4, "Wherever You Go" at #3, "Summer's Comin'" at #1, the title track at #2 and "Life Gets Away" at #4.

Among the album's collaborations are the songs "Untanglin' My Mind", co-written with Merle Haggard, and "You Made Me Feel", co-written with Michael McDonald.

One Emotion was a commercial success, becoming Black's fifth consecutive album to be certified at least platinum by the RIAA.

== Track listing ==
All tracks are written by Clint Black and Hayden Nicholas, except where noted.

No.	Title	Writer(s)	Length
1.	"One Emotion"		2:42
2.	"Summer's Comin'"		2:47
3.	"Untanglin' My Mind"	Black, Merle Haggard	3:24
4.	"Wherever You Go"		4:12
5.	"A Change in the Air"		2:52
6.	"Life Gets Away"	Black, Nicholas, Thom Schuyler	2:56
7.	"I Can Get By"	Black	4:11
8.	"Hey Hot Rod"	Black, Shake Russell	2:41
9.	"You Walked By"	Black	2:08
10.	"You Made Me Feel"	Black, Michael McDonald	3:41

== Personnel ==
=== Band ===
- Clint Black - acoustic guitar, electric guitar, harmonica, lead vocals, background vocals, 12-string guitar
- Hayden Nicholas - acoustic guitar, electric guitar, electric sitar, baritone guitar
- Eddie Bayers - drums
- Dane Bryant - piano
- Thom Flora - background vocals
- Dick Gay - drums
- Aubrey Haynie - fiddle
- Dann Huff - electric guitar
- Brent Mason - electric guitar
- Jeff Peterson - dobro, acoustic guitar, steel guitar, melobar
- John Wesley Ryles - background vocals
- Biff Watson - acoustic guitar
- Jake Willemain - bass guitar
- Glenn Worf - bass guitar
- Curtis Young - background vocals
- Martin Young - acoustic guitar

=== Production ===
- Clint Black - producer
- James Stroud - producer
- Zack Berry - production assistant
- Ricky Cobble - assistant engineer
- Mark Hagen - assistant engineer, mixing assistant
- Julian King - engineer
- Glenn Meadows - mastering
- Lynn Peterzell - engineer, mixing
- Doug Rich - production assistant

== Charts ==
=== Weekly charts ===
Chart (1994)	Peak position
US Billboard 200	37
US Top Country Albums (Billboard)	8

=== Year-end charts ===
Chart (1995)	Position
US Top Country Albums (Billboard)	26

=== Singles ===
Year	Single	Peak positions	
Year	Single	US Country	CAN Country
1994	"Untanglin' My Mind"	4	3
1995	"Wherever You Go"	3	4
1995	"Summer's Comin'"	1	1
1995	"One Emotion"	2	1
1995	"Life Gets Away"	4	1
