= A Good Run of Bad Luck =

Single by Clint Black

from the album No Time to Kill
- B-side: "Half the Man"
- Released: February 28, 1994
- Genre: Country, country rock
- Length: 2:42
- Label: RCA Nashville
- Songwriters: Clint Black, Hayden Nicholas
- Producers: James Stroud, Clint Black

Clint Black singles chronology
"State of Mind" (1993)	"A Good Run of Bad Luck" (1994)	"Half the Man" (1994)

"A Good Run of Bad Luck" is a song co-written and recorded by American country music artist Clint Black. It was released in February 1994 as the fourth single from his album No Time to Kill. It reached number one on both the United States and Canadian country charts. The song was written by Black and Hayden Nicholas. It also appeared on the 1994 soundtrack to the film Maverick.

== Content ==
The song is an uptempo that discusses falling in love by using gambling metaphors. The narrator compares gambling to love relationships.

== Music video ==
The music video was Black's first that he directed himself, and premiered in early 1994. The music video shows Black and his band playing in a dark room with playing cards on the floor. Also scenes from the movie Maverick, in which Black had a cameo and whose soundtrack the song also appears on, are shown in the video.

== Chart positions ==
"A Good Run of Bad Luck" debuted at number 54 on the U.S. Billboard Hot Country Singles & Tracks for the week of March 5, 1994.

Chart (1994)	Peak position
Canada Country Singles (RPM)	1
US Hot Country Songs (Billboard)	1

=== Year-end charts ===
Chart (1994)	Position
Canada Country Tracks (RPM)	28
US Country Songs (Billboard)	20
