= Still Holding On =

Single by Clint Black and Martina McBride

from the album Nothin' but the Taillights and Evolution
- B-side: "Still Holding On" (long version)
- Released: June 2, 1997
- Genre: Country
- Length: 4:37 (album version); 4:53 (long version); 3:57 (single version)
- Label: RCA Nashville #64850
- Songwriters: Clint Black; Matraca Berg; Marty Stuart
- Producers: Clint Black; James Stroud

Clint Black singles chronology
"Half Way Up" (1996)	"Still Holding On" (1997)	"Something That We Do" (1997)

Martina McBride singles chronology
"Cry on the Shoulder of the Road" (1997)	"Still Holding On" (1997)	"A Broken Wing" (1997)

"Still Holding On" is a song recorded by American country music artists Clint Black and Martina McBride, written by Black along with Matraca Berg and Marty Stuart. It was released in June 1997 as the first single from Black's album Nothin' but the Taillights and McBride's album Evolution.

== History ==
Black told Billboard that Joe Galante, then the chairman of RCA Records, suggested that he record a duet, because he thought that it would be a good time in Black's career for him to release one. Because of her busy schedule, McBride cut the duet vocals with Black in one day.

The song received a nomination for the Grammy Award for Best Country Collaboration with Vocals at the 40th Annual Grammy Awards in 1998.

Still Holding On is also a television film which aired in 1998 based on the rodeo career of Jack Favor, who served seven years in the Louisiana State Penitentiary on false conviction of two murders based on perjured testimony He was acquitted in a second trial in 1974. Black plays Favor in the film, and Lisa Hartman Black is cast as Ponder Favor, Jack's wife.

== Critical reception ==
Deborah Evans Price, of Billboard magazine reviewed the song favorably, saying that Black's and McBride's voices "blend beautifully, and when they soar into the chorus, it's goosebumps time." She goes on to call the song "the clearest possible definition of a hit."

== Chart performance ==
On the Hot Country Singles & Tracks charts in the United States, "Still Holding On" debuted on the chart dated for the week ending June 14, 1997. It spent 20 weeks on that chart, peaking at number 11. With a peak of number 11, it became his first single to miss the Top 10 on the Hot Country Singles & Tracks Chart.

In Canada, the song debuted at number 83 on the RPM Country Tracks charts on the week of June 16 and peaked at number 1 on the week of August 18. In addition, it peaked at number 50 on the same publication's Adult Contemporary chart.

Chart (1997)	Peak position
Canada Adult Contemporary (RPM)	50
Canada Country Singles (RPM)	1
US Hot Country Songs (Billboard)	11

=== Year-end charts ===
Chart (1997)	Position
Canada Country Tracks (RPM)	20
