= Like the Rain =

Single by Clint Black

from the album Greatest Hits
- B-side: "Desperado"
- Released: September 2, 1996
- Genre: Country
- Length: 4:22 (album version); 3:30 (single version)
- Label: RCA Nashville
- Songwriters: Clint Black; Hayden Nicholas
- Producers: Clint Black; James Stroud

Clint Black singles chronology
"Life Gets Away" (1995)	"Like the Rain" (1996)	"Half Way Up" (1996)

"Like the Rain" is a song co-written and recorded by American country music artist Clint Black. It was released in September 1996 as the first single from his Greatest Hits compilation album. The song became his 23rd chart single, and in October of that year, it became his tenth Number One hit on the Billboard Hot Country Singles & Tracks (now Hot Country Songs) charts. It held that position for three weeks. At the 1997 Grammy Awards, "Like the Rain" was nominated for the Best Male Country Vocal performance. The song was written by Black and Hayden Nicholas.

== Content ==
"Like the Rain" is a country ballad, backed mainly by acoustic guitar and piano, with heavy snare drum accents. The narrator tells of how he "never liked the rain" until he walked through it with his lover. In the chorus, he adds that he "can't believe [he] never liked the rain", and then elaborates that he is "falling for [her] now, just like the rain". The album version features the sounds of rain and thunder at the beginning and end. These sound effects were lacked from the single edit.

Black also re-recorded the song, at a slightly slower tempo, for his 2007 compilation The Love Songs.

== Critical reception ==
Deborah Evans Price, of Billboard magazine reviewed the song favorably by saying that the song is a "moody offering with a driving melody and strong lyric." and that Black "turns in his reliably potent vocal performance."

== Chart positions ==
"Like the Rain" debuted at number 42 on the U.S. Billboard Hot Country Singles & Tracks for the week of September 7, 1996.

Chart (1996)	Peak position
Canada Adult Contemporary (RPM)	47
Canada Country Singles (RPM)	1
US Hot Country Songs (Billboard)	1

=== Year-end charts ===
Chart (1996)	Position
Canada Country Tracks (RPM)	24
US Country Songs (Billboard)	51

== Certifications ==
Certifications for Like the Rain
Region	Certification	Certified units/sales
United States (RIAA)	Gold	500,000^{‡}
^{‡} Sales+streaming figures based on certification alone.
