= Wherever You Go (Clint Black song) =

Single by Clint Black

Single by Clint Black

from the album One Emotion
- B-side: "You Walked By"
- Released: January 2, 1995
- Genre: Country
- Length: 4:12
- Label: RCA Nashville
- Songwriters: Clint Black; Hayden Nicholas
- Producers: Clint Black; James Stroud

Clint Black singles chronology
"Untanglin' My Mind" (1994)	"Wherever You Go" (1995)	"Summer's Comin'" (1995)

"Wherever You Go" is a song co-written and recorded by American country music singer Clint Black. It was released in January 1995 as the second single from the album One Emotion. It peaked at number 3 on the U.S. Billboard Hot Country Singles & Tracks chart and reached number 4 on the Canadian RPM Country Tracks chart. The song was written by Black and Hayden Nicholas.

== Critical reception ==
Mike Joyce of The Washington Post gave the song a positive review, saying that Black was "resourceful" for "convert[ing] the existential catchphrase 'wherever you go, you're there' into another fool-on-the-bar-stool blues."

== Chart positions ==
"Wherever You Go" debuted at number 69 on the U.S. Billboard Hot Country Singles & Tracks for the week of December 31, 1994.

Chart (1995)	Peak position
Canada Country Singles (RPM)	4
US Hot Country Songs (Billboard)	3

=== Year-end charts ===
Chart (1995)	Position
Canada Country Tracks (RPM)	71
US Country Songs (Billboard)	52
