= Half Way Up =

Single by Clint Black

from the album Greatest Hits
- B-side: "Cadillac Jack Favor"
- Released: November 18, 1996
- Genre: Country
- Length: 3:58
- Label: RCA Nashville
- Songwriters: Clint Black; Hayden Nicholas
- Producers: James Stroud; Clint Black

Clint Black singles chronology
"Like the Rain" (1996)	"Half Way Up" (1996)	"Still Holding On" (1997)

"Half Way Up" is a song co-written and recorded by American country music singer Clint Black. It was released in November 1996 as the second single from his Greatest Hits compilation album. It peaked at number 6 on the U.S. Billboard Hot Country Singles & Tracks chart and reached number 2 on the Canadian RPM Country Tracks chart. It was written by Black with Hayden Nicholas.

== Critical reception ==
Deborah Evans Price, of Billboard magazine reviewed the song favorably, saying that the song has a "positively insinuating groove." She goes on to say that Black's "textured performance and meaty lyric as calling cards should make it a quick favorite."

== Chart positions ==
"Half Way Up" debuted at number 47 on the U.S. Billboard Hot Country Singles & Tracks for the week of November 30, 1996.

Chart (1996–1997)	Peak position
Canada Country Singles (RPM)	2
US Hot Country Songs (Billboard)	6

=== Year-end charts ===
Chart (1997)	Position
Canada Country Tracks (RPM)	23
US Country Songs (Billboard)	48
