= Untanglin' My Mind =

Single by Clint Black

from the album One Emotion
- B-side: "I Can Get By"
- Released: September 1994
- Genre: Country
- Length: 3:24
- Label: RCA Nashville
- Songwriters: Clint Black; Merle Haggard
- Producers: James Stroud; Clint Black

Clint Black singles chronology
"Half the Man" (1994)	"Untanglin' My Mind" (1994)	"Wherever You Go" (1995)

"Untanglin' My Mind" is a song co-written and recorded by American country music singer Clint Black. Black wrote the song with Merle Haggard. It was released in September 1994 as the lead single from the album One Emotion. The song peaked at number 4 on the U.S. Billboard Hot Country Singles & Tracks chart and reached number 3 on the Canadian RPM Country Tracks chart. Haggard also recorded the song on his 1996 album 1996.

== Content ==
The song is a ballad in which the narrator states that if anyone were to ask his now ex-lover where he's gone, that she should state he's elsewhere.

== Critical reception ==
Mike Joyce of The Washington Post gave the song a positive review, saying that it was "the album's best tune" and saying that it showed the similarities in Black's and Haggard's styles.

== Music video ==
The music video was directed by Clint Black himself and premiered in October 1994.

== Chart positions ==
Chart (1994)	Peak position
Canada Country Singles (RPM)	3
US Hot Country Songs (Billboard)	4
