= Been There =

Single by Clint Black with Steve Wariner

from the album D'lectrified
- B-side: "When I Said I Do"
- Released: January 10, 2000
- Recorded: 1999
- Genre: Country
- Length: 5:35 (album version); 3:47 (radio edit)
- Label: RCA Nashville
- Songwriters: Clint Black, Steve Wariner
- Producer: Clint Black

Clint Black singles chronology
"When I Said I Do" (1999)	"Been There" (2000)	"Love She Can't Live Without" (2000)

Steve Wariner singles chronology
"I'm Already Taken" (1999)	"Been There" (2000)	"Faith in You" (2000)

"Been There" is a song written and recorded by American country music artists Clint Black and Steve Wariner that peaked at number 5 on the Billboard Hot Country Singles & Tracks chart in 2000. It was released in January 2000, as the second single from Black's album D'lectrified. It was the final Top Ten hit for Wariner on the country singles charts, and also Black's final Top Ten hit as a lead artist.

== Content ==
"Been There" is vocal duet by Black and Wariner, both of whom wrote the song. In it, they both describe being in certain undesirable situations, such as waking up "in the middle of a dream that didn't come true". They tell each other that they have "been there" and "don't wanna go back again". The song features steel-string acoustic guitar accompaniment from Wariner, and harmonica accompaniment from Black, as well as piano and Dobro flourishes. Extended harmonica and acoustic guitar trade-offs, which were abridged on the single edit, finish off the song. Like all the other songs on D'lectrified, "Been There" uses only acoustic instruments.

The song is in the key of A major with an approximate tempo of 96 beats per minute and a vocal range of E_{4}-D_{6}. The verses feature a repeating pattern of A and D chords for three lines before ending on the chord progression G-D-A, while the chorus follows the progression C♯m-D-C♯m-F♯m-C♯m-D-G-E.

== Music video ==
The music video for this song begins with a static screen on the TV, then the camera zooms out, revealing it is coming from a TV. The scene then shows Black in bed with his pajamas, singing and playing a harmonica, as a band is shown through his outside window. The second verse shows Wariner watching TV and playing guitar in the living room of his house. The band shown in Black's window is also shown in Wariner's television. As soon as Wariner opens a door, scene changes between the two singers singing in different parts of a basement. Black then opens the door of his house, and the two are singing in a blue room. Towards the end of the music video, the scene changes back to Black's bedroom, with Black in his pajamas, as he is being lifted from his bed. After many changing scenes between Wariner's living room and the blue room, Black suddenly drops back on the bed, then gets up and climbs to the ceiling. During the last scene the video, scene changes between Black and Wariner in the blue room, playing their instruments, followed by a static screen, and Black walks back through it, and the band freezes, and the video ends.

== Chart performance ==
The song debuted at number 60 on the Billboard Hot Country Singles & Tracks chart dated January 15, 2000, and peaked at number 5 the chart dated April 15, 2000, staying for two consecutive weeks. The song also peaked at number 44 on the Billboard Hot 100. In addition, it spent four non-consecutive weeks at Number One on the RPM Country Tracks charts in Canada.

Chart (2000)	Peak position
Canada Country Singles (RPM)	1
US Billboard Hot 100	44
US Hot Country Songs (Billboard)	5

=== Year-end charts ===
Chart (2000)	Position
US Country Songs (Billboard)	35
