= State of Mind (Clint Black song) =

Single by Clint Black

from the album No Time to Kill
- B-side: "Tuckered Out"
- Released: November 15, 1993
- Genre: Country
- Length: 3:53 (album version); 2:43 (radio edit)
- Label: RCA Nashville
- Songwriter: Clint Black
- Producers: James Stroud, Clint Black

Clint Black singles chronology
"No Time to Kill" (1993)	"State of Mind" (1993)	"A Good Run of Bad Luck" (1994)

"State of Mind" is a song written and recorded by American country music artist Clint Black. It was released in November 1993 as the third single from his album No Time to Kill. It peaked at number 2 in both the United States and Canada.

The song's b-side, "Tuckered Out," charted at number 74 for the week of February 5, 1994.

== Critical reception ==
A review in Billboard stated, "Set to a midtempo beat and energizing fiddles, Black reflects on the transporting power of familiar music."

== Music video ==
The music video was directed by Palomar Pictures, and premiered in late 1993. It uses the single version of the song, which omits Black's harmonica solo in the beginning of the album version.

== Chart positions ==
Chart (1993–1994)	Peak position
Canada Country Singles (RPM)	2
US Bubbling Under Hot 100 (Billboard)	2
US Hot Country Songs (Billboard)	2

=== Year-end charts ===
Chart (1994)	Position
Canada Country Tracks (RPM)	49
US Country Songs (Billboard)	19
