= A Bad Goodbye =

Single by Clint Black with Wynonna Judd

from the album No Time to Kill
- B-side: "The Hard Way"
- Released: May 3, 1993
- Genre: Country
- Length: 3:39
- Label: RCA Nashville
- Songwriter: Clint Black
- Producers: Clint Black and James Stroud

Clint Black singles chronology
"When My Ship Comes In" (1993)	"A Bad Goodbye" (1993)	"No Time to Kill" (1993)

Wynonna singles chronology
"Tell Me Why" (1993)	"A Bad Goodbye" (1993)	"Only Love" (1993)

"A Bad Goodbye" is a song written by American country music artist Clint Black, and recorded by him as a duet with fellow country music artist Wynonna Judd. The song was recorded after the two toured together during their "Black and Wy" tour in 1993. It was released in May 1993 as the first single from Black's album No Time to Kill. It peaked at number 2 on the Billboard Hot Country Singles & Tracks (now Hot Country Songs) chart, behind "Chattahoochee" by Alan Jackson. In addition, it was Black's first appearance on the Billboard Hot 100, peaking at number 43 there.

The song was also nominated for Vocal Event of the Year at the 1993 Academy of Country Music awards.

== Critical reception ==
In his review of Black's album, Time magazine reviewer Christopher John Farley noted that Judd's voice "draws out an emotional edge" in Black's voice. Overall, he thought that the collaboration added an edge to No Time to Kill that Black's first three albums lacked. Deborah Evans Price, of Billboard magazine reviewed the song favorably, calling the lyrics "direct, moving and majestic." She goes on to say that the song has "'single of the year' written all over it."

The song followed a "Black & Wy" tour, which featured Black and Judd touring together.

== Music video ==
The music video was directed by Peter Nydrle and produced by Paul Flattery. It was shot in Arizona during their "Black & Wy" tour and premiered in May 1993.

== Charts ==
"A Bad Goodbye" debuted at number 55 on the US Billboard Hot Country Singles & Tracks for the week of May 15, 1993.

=== Weekly charts ===
Chart (1993)	Peak position
Canada Country Singles (RPM)	1
US Billboard Hot 100	43
US Hot Country Songs (Billboard)	2
US Cash Box Top 100	45

=== Year-end charts ===
Chart (1993)	Position
Canada Country Tracks (RPM)	14
US Country Songs (Billboard)	19
