= No Time to Kill (song) =

Single by Clint Black

from the album No Time to Kill
- B-side: "Happiness Alone"
- Released: August 2, 1993
- Genre: Country
- Length: 3:59
- Label: RCA Nashville
- Songwriters: Clint Black; Hayden Nicholas
- Producers: James Stroud; Clint Black

Clint Black singles chronology
"A Bad Goodbye" (1993)	"No Time to Kill" (1993)	"State of Mind" (1993)

"No Time to Kill" is a song co-written and recorded by American country music singer Clint Black. It was released in August 1993 as the second single and the title track from his album No Time to Kill. The song peaked at number 3 on the U.S. Billboard Hot Country Singles & Tracks chart and at number 2 on the Canadian RPM Country Tracks chart. It was written by Black and Hayden Nicholas.

== Personnel ==
Per liner notes.

- Clint Black – lead and background vocals
- Larry Byrom – acoustic guitar
- Lenny Castro – percussion
- Jerry Douglas – Dobro
- Stuart Duncan – fiddle
- Paul Franklin – steel guitar
- Ed Greene – drums
- Dann Huff – electric guitar
- Kenny Loggins – background vocals
- Hayden Nicholas – acoustic guitar
- Matt Rollings – piano
- Timothy B. Schmit – background vocals
- Leland Sklar – bass guitar

== Chart positions ==
"No Time to Kill" debuted at number 57 on the U.S. Billboard Hot Country Singles & Tracks for the week of August 14, 1993.

Chart (1993)	Peak position
Canada Country Singles (RPM)	2
US Hot Country Songs (Billboard)	3

=== Year-end charts ===
Chart (1993)	Position
Canada Country Tracks (RPM)	33
US Country Songs (Billboard)	20
