= The Shoes You're Wearing =

Single by Clint Black

from the album Nothin' but the Taillights
- B-side: "Nothin' but the Taillights"
- Released: April 13, 1998
- Genre: Country
- Length: 3:56 (album version); 3:29 (single version)
- Label: RCA Nashville
- Songwriters: Clint Black, Hayden Nicholas
- Producers: James Stroud, Clint Black

Clint Black singles chronology
"Nothin' but the Taillights" (1998)	"The Shoes You're Wearing" (1998)	"Loosen Up My Strings" (1998)

"The Shoes You're Wearing" is a song co-written and recorded by American country music artist Clint Black. It was released in April 1998 as the fourth single from Black's Nothin' but the Taillights album. The song reached Number One on the U.S. Billboard Hot Country Singles & Tracks (now Hot Country Songs) chart and reached number one in Canada. It was written by Black and Hayden Nicholas.

== Critical reception ==
Chuck Taylor, of Billboard magazine reviewed the song favorably saying that the song is "about equality among people in forthright but not preachy terms" Taylor goes on to say that "the melody and the background have an airy, Eagles-esque feel that sounds radio-friendly."

== Music video ==
The music video was directed by Clint Black and Brent Hedgecock, and premiered in mid-1998.

== Chart performance ==
"The Shoes You're Wearing" debuted at number 52 on the U.S. Billboard Hot Country Singles & Tracks for the week of April 11, 1998.

Chart (1998)	Peak position
Canada Country Singles (RPM)	1
US Bubbling Under Hot 100 (Billboard)	18
US Hot Country Songs (Billboard)	1

=== Year-end charts ===
Chart (1998)	Position
Canada Country Tracks (RPM)	12
US Country Songs (Billboard)	36
