= Looking for Christmas =

Studio album by Clint Black
- Released: October 17, 1995
- Genre: Country, Christmas
- Length: 31:39
- Label: RCA Nashville
- Producer: James Stroud, Clint Black

Clint Black chronology
One Emotion (1994)	Looking for Christmas (1995)	Greatest Hits (1996)

Professional ratings
Review scores
Source	Rating
Allmusic	link
Entertainment Weekly	B+ link

Looking for Christmas is the sixth studio album by American country music singer Clint Black. The album was released on October 17, 1995. His first album of Christmas music, it features the song "'Til Santa's Gone (Milk and Cookies)". This song charted on several occasions on the Hot Country Songs charts, reaching as high as #34 based on Christmas airplay.

== Track listing ==
All tracks are written by Clint Black, except where noted.

No.	Title	Writer(s)	Length
1.	"The Finest Gift"	Black, Hayden Nicholas	3:33
2.	"Under the Mistletoe"		3:45
3.	"The Kid"	Black, Nicholas, Merle Haggard	3:20
4.	"The Coolest Pair"		2:44
5.	"Looking for Christmas"		3:48
6.	"Christmas for Every Boy and Girl"		3:40
7.	"'Til Santa's Gone (Milk and Cookies)"	Black, Nicholas, Shake Russell	2:41
8.	"Slow as Christmas"	Black, Nicholas	2:06
9.	"The Birth of the King"		4:15
10.	"Looking for Christmas (Reprise)"		1:32

== Personnel ==
- Sam Bacco - percussion
- Eddie Bayers - drums
- Clint Black - harmonica, lead vocals
- Robbie Buchanan - keyboards, piano
- Jerry Douglas - dobro
- Stuart Duncan - fiddle
- Pat Enright - acoustic guitar
- Dick Gay - drums
- Warren Hill - saxophone
- Dann Huff - electric guitar
- Ronn Huff - string conductor
- Jeff Huskins - fiddle
- Sam Levine - recorder
- Gene Libbea - bass flute
- The London Session Orchestra - strings
- Hayden Nicholas - acoustic guitar
- Alan O'Bryant - banjo
- Jeff Peterson - steel guitar
- Tom Roady - percussion
- John Robinson - drums
- Leland Sklar - bass guitar
- Fred Tackett - acoustic guitar
- George Tidwell - flugelhorn
- Cindy Richardson Walker - background vocals
- Roland White - mandolin
- Jake Willemain - bass guitar
- Curtis Young - background vocals

== Chart performance ==
=== Album ===
Chart (1995)	Peak position
U.S. Billboard Top Country Albums	25
U.S. Billboard 200	138
U.S. Billboard Top Holiday Albums	20

=== Singles ===
Year	Single	Peak positions
Year	Single	US Country
1999	"The Kid"	67
2000	"'Til Santa's Gone (Milk and Cookies)"^{A}	34

- ^{A}Released as "'Til Santa's Gone (I Just Can't Wait)"
