= Life Gets Away =

Single by Clint Black

from the album One Emotion
- B-side: "The Kid"
- Released: October 9, 1995
- Genre: Country
- Length: 2:56
- Label: RCA Nashville
- Songwriters: Clint Black; Hayden Nicholas; Thom Schuyler
- Producers: James Stroud; Clint Black

Clint Black singles chronology
"One Emotion" (1995)	"Life Gets Away" (1995)	"Like the Rain" (1996)

"Life Gets Away" is a song co-written and recorded by American country music artist Clint Black. It was released in October 1995 as the fifth and final single from Black's album One Emotion. The song reached number 4 on the U.S. Billboard Hot Country Singles & Tracks chart in December 1995 and number 1 on the RPM Country Tracks chart in Canada. It was written by Black, Hayden Nicholas and Thom Schuyler.

== Critical reception ==
Deborah Evans Price, of Billboard magazine reviewed the song favorably, saying that the production is "lively with an anthemic feel, but the meat of the song is in the undeniable truth of the lyrics: 'Life gets away from us all.'"

== Chart performance ==
"Life Gets Away" debuted at number 64 on the U.S. Billboard Hot Country Singles & Tracks for the week of October 14, 1995.

Chart (1995)	Peak position
Canada Country Singles (RPM)	1
US Hot Country Songs (Billboard)	4

=== Year-end charts ===
Chart (1996)	Position
Canada Country Tracks (RPM)	77
