= Half the Man (Clint Black song) =

Single by Clint Black

from the album No Time to Kill
- B-side: "Back to Back"
- Released: May 30, 1994
- Genre: Country
- Length: 3:00
- Label: RCA Nashville
- Songwriters: Clint Black; Hayden Nicholas
- Producers: James Stroud; Clint Black

Clint Black singles chronology
| "A Good Run of Bad Luck" (1994) | "Half the Man" (1994) | "Untanglin' My Mind" (1994) |

"Half the Man" is a song co-written and recorded by American country music singer Clint Black. It was released in May 1994 as the fifth and last single from his album No Time to Kill. Before its release, the song served as the b-side to "A Good Run of Bad Luck." The song peaked at number 4 on the U.S. Billboard Hot Country Singles & Tracks chart and at number 5 on the Canadian RPM Country Tracks chart. It was written by Black and Hayden Nicholas.

== Chart positions ==
"Half the Man" debuted at number 65 on the U.S. Billboard Hot Country Singles & Tracks for the week of June 11, 1994.

| Chart (1994) | Peak position |
|---|---|
| Canada Country Singles (RPM) | 5 |
| US Hot Country Songs (Billboard) | 4 |

=== Year-end charts ===
| Chart (1994) | Position |
|---|---|
| Canada Country Tracks (RPM) | 100 |
| US Country Songs (Billboard) | 56 |
