= Nothin' but the Taillights (song) =

Single by Clint Black

from the album Nothin' but the Taillights
- B-side: "Cadillac Jack Favor"
- Released: January 27, 1998
- Genre: Country
- Length: 3:54
- Label: RCA Nashville
- Songwriters: Clint Black, Steve Wariner
- Producers: James Stroud, Clint Black

Clint Black singles chronology
"Something That We Do" (1997)	"Nothin' but the Taillights" (1998)	"The Shoes You're Wearing" (1998)

"Nothin' but The Taillights" is a song co-written and recorded by American country music artist Clint Black. The song reached the top of the Billboard Hot Country Singles & Tracks chart. It was released in January 1998 as the third single and title track from his album of the same name. The song was written by Black and Steve Wariner. This became the first song in which Clint Black began a songwriting partnership with Steve Wariner. Very soon after, Clint Black and Steve Wariner began writing some new songs together for Clint Black's future studio releases.

== Content ==
The song is an uptempo, in which the narrator is on the side of the road after being left by his lover. She drives his pickup truck away down the Kentucky highway and all he can see is the taillights.

== Chart performance ==
"Nothin' But The Taillights" debuted at number 43 on the Hot Country Singles & Tracks chart in mid-January 1998, and quickly climbed to Number One in March, where it held for two weeks. This single became Black's eleventh number-one single, twenty-sixth Top Ten single, and twenty-seventh Top Twenty single.

Chart (1998)	Peak position
Canada Country Singles (RPM)	1
US Bubbling Under Hot 100 (Billboard)	16
US Hot Country Songs (Billboard)	1

=== Year-end charts ===
Chart (1998)	Position
Canada Country Tracks (RPM)	30
US Country Songs (Billboard)	14
