= One Emotion (song) =

Single by Clint Black

from the album One Emotion
- B-side: "You Made Me Feel"
- Released: July 3, 1995
- Genre: Country
- Length: 2:42
- Label: RCA Nashville
- Songwriters: Clint Black; Hayden Nicholas
- Producers: James Stroud; Clint Black

Clint Black singles chronology
"Summer's Comin'" (1995)	"One Emotion" (1995)	"Life Gets Away" (1995)

"One Emotion" is a song recorded by the American country music artist Clint Black, co-written by Black and Hayden Nicholas. It was released in July 1995 as the fourth single from his album One Emotion.

== Critical reception ==
Larry Flick, of Billboard magazine reviewed the song favorably, calling it a "pretty love song laced with steel guitar". He went on to say, "No bells and whistles here, just Black's usually flawless delivery of a solid song."

== Music video ==
The music video was directed by Clint Black himself and was premiered in July 1995.

== Chart performance ==
In the USA, the song spent 20 weeks on Hot Country Songs in 1995, debuting at number 64 on the chart for the week ending July 8 and spending two weeks at a peak of number 2. In Canada, the song peaked at number one on the RPM Country Tracks charts for the week ending September 18, 1995.

Chart (1995)	Peak position
Canada Country Singles (RPM)	1
US Hot Country Songs (Billboard)	2

=== Year-end charts ===
Chart (1995)	Position
Canada Country Tracks (RPM)	47
US Country Songs (Billboard)	30
