= When I Said I Do =

Single by Clint Black with Lisa Hartman Black

from the album D'lectrified
- B-side: "You Don't Need Me Now"
- Released: August 30, 1999
- Genre: Country
- Length: 4:30 (album version); 4:05 (single edit)
- Label: RCA Nashville
- Songwriter: Clint Black
- Producer: Clint Black

Clint Black singles chronology
"You Don't Need Me Now" (1999)	"When I Said I Do" (1999)	"Been There" (2000)

Lisa Hartman Black singles chronology
"When I Said I Do" (1999)	"Easy for Me to Say" (2001)

"When I Said I Do" is a song written by American country music singer Clint Black, and recorded by Black and his wife Lisa Hartman Black as a duet. It was released in August 1999 as the first single from Black's album D'lectrified. The song reached the top of the U.S. Billboard Hot Country Singles & Tracks chart and the Canadian RPM Country Tracks chart. It also peaked at number 31 on the U.S. Billboard Hot 100. It is one of only two chart singles for Lisa Hartman Black. The song was later covered by then-husband and wife Kenny Lattimore and Chanté Moore on their album Things That Lovers Do.

== Content ==
This song discusses the narrators' vow to stay together until the end of their lives.

== Music video ==
The music video for "When I Said I Do" was directed by Clint Black himself. The video premiered on CMT on September 6, 1999.

== Chart performance ==
"When I Said I Do" debuted at number 45 on the U.S. Billboard Hot Country Singles & Tracks chart for the week of September 4, 1999. For the chart dated December 4, 1999, it became Clint's thirteenth and final number one single on that chart, and the only number one single for Lisa. The following week, it fell to number two, being replaced at the top by Brad Paisley's "He Didn't Have to Be". It then returned to number one on the chart dated December 18 for a second and final week, making for two nonconsecutive weeks at the top.

Chart (1999)	Peak position
Canada Country Singles (RPM)	1
US Billboard Hot 100	31
US Hot Country Songs (Billboard)	1

=== Year-end charts ===
Chart (1999)	Position
Canada Country Tracks (RPM)	75
US Country Songs (Billboard)	65

Chart (2000)	Position
US Country Songs (Billboard)	45

== Certifications ==
Certifications for When I Said I Do
Region	Certification	Certified units/sales
United States (RIAA)	Gold	500,000^{‡}
^{‡} Sales+streaming figures based on certification alone.
