= Summer's Comin' =

Single by Clint Black

from the album One Emotion
- B-side: "Hey Hot Rod"
- Released: March 27, 1995
- Genre: Country
- Length: 2:47
- Label: RCA Nashville
- Songwriters: Clint Black, Hayden Nicholas
- Producers: Clint Black, James Stroud

Clint Black singles chronology
"Wherever You Go" (1995)	"Summer's Comin'" (1995)	"One Emotion" (1995)

"Summer's Comin'" is a song co-written and recorded by American country music singer Clint Black. It was released in March 1995 as the third single from his album One Emotion. The song reached the top of the Billboard Hot Country Singles & Tracks chart and the Canadian RPM Country Tracks chart. It was written by Black and Hayden Nicholas.

== Critical reception ==
Deborah Evans Price, of Billboard magazine reviewed the song unfavorably, questioning why Black would want to "waste his time composing refried Beach Boys music like this?" She concludes the review by saying that it sounds like Black "has been spending a little too much time in the sun."

== Music video ==
The music video (directed entirely by Black himself) begins with a man (actor and TV personality Howie Mandel) skipping out from his job on a beautiful day and driving to a beach. There are many women there, but every woman he approaches turns out to be a man. His exploits on the beach are interwoven with shots of Black playing guitar and singing on that same beach. At the end of the video, a woman (Lisa Hartman Black, Clint Black's real-life wife) waves as she climbs off of a personal water craft and begins running towards Mandel. He opens his arms, assuming that she's running to him. But she shoves him aside and runs to Black instead, who turns to Mandel and says, "Don't even think about it." As Mandel appears heartbroken, actor Joey Lawrence (from the NBC TV series Blossom) pops up in front of the camera and utters his signature catchphrase, "Whoa!".

Other celebrities making a cameo appearance in the video include former Tonight Show host Jay Leno (as a sunbather laying in the sand), Leland Sklar (as Moses), David Hasselhoff (from the NBC TV series Knight Rider, as himself, speaking animatedly to a group of women before removing his sunglasses), George Kennedy (as a model in a photo shoot), country music host Charlie Chase (of the duo Crook & Chase, as a volleyball player), Gerald McRaney (of the CBS series Simon & Simon, as a customer at a snack stand), and Dick Clark (leaning on the rail of the pier).

== Personnel ==
- Eddie Bayers — drums
- Clint Black — lead and backing vocals
- Dane Bryant — piano
- Dann Huff — electric guitar
- Jeff Peterson — pedal steel guitar
- Biff Watson — acoustic guitar
- Glenn Worf — bass guitar
- Curtis Young — backing vocals

== Chart positions ==
"Summer's Comin'" debuted at number 51 on the U.S. Billboard Hot Country Singles & Tracks for the week of April 8, 1995.

Chart (1995)	Peak position
Canada Country Singles (RPM)	1
US Hot Country Songs (Billboard)	1

=== Year-end charts ===
Chart (1995)	Position
Canada Country Tracks (RPM)	9
US Country Songs (Billboard)	4
