= Something That We Do =

Single by Clint Black

from the album Nothin' But the Taillights
- Released: August 25, 1997
- Recorded: 1997
- Genre: Country
- Length: 3:58
- Label: RCA Nashville
- Songwriters: Clint Black, Skip Ewing
- Producers: James Stroud, Clint Black

Clint Black singles chronology
"Still Holding On" (1997)	"Something That We Do" (1997)	"Nothin' but the Taillights" (1998)

"Something That We Do" is a song recorded by American country music artist Clint Black and written by Black and Skip Ewing. It was released in August 1997 as the second single from Black's album Nothin' but the Taillights and peaked at number 2 on the U.S. Billboard Hot Country Singles & Tracks chart and number 4 on the Canadian RPM Country Tracks chart. It was voted song of the year by the Nashville Songwriters Association International.

== Content ==
The song explores the complexities of romantic relationships and offers the simple truth that "Love isn't something that we're in/It's something that we do." It is sung in the key of G major and a slow tempo of 66 beats per minute. The guitar in the song is set to Open D tuning, with a capo on the fifth fret.

== Critical reception ==
Deborah Evans Price, of Billboard magazine reviewed the song favorably, saying that the song "has a powerful and poignant poetic tone that illuminates more about the nature of love and relationships in a few minutes than several books on the subject ever could." She goes on to call the song a "sweet, moving ballad."

== Music video ==
The music video was directed by Black with the help of Timothy White.

== Charts ==
"Something That We Do" debuted at number 62 on the U.S. Billboard Hot Country Singles & Tracks for the week of August 30, 1997.

Chart (1997)	Peak position
Canada Country Singles (RPM)	3
US Billboard Hot 100	76
US Hot Country Songs (Billboard)	2

=== Year-end charts ===
Chart (1997)	Position
Canada Country Tracks (RPM)	89
US Country Songs (Billboard)	75
