= Lisa Hartman Black =

American actress and singer (born 1956)

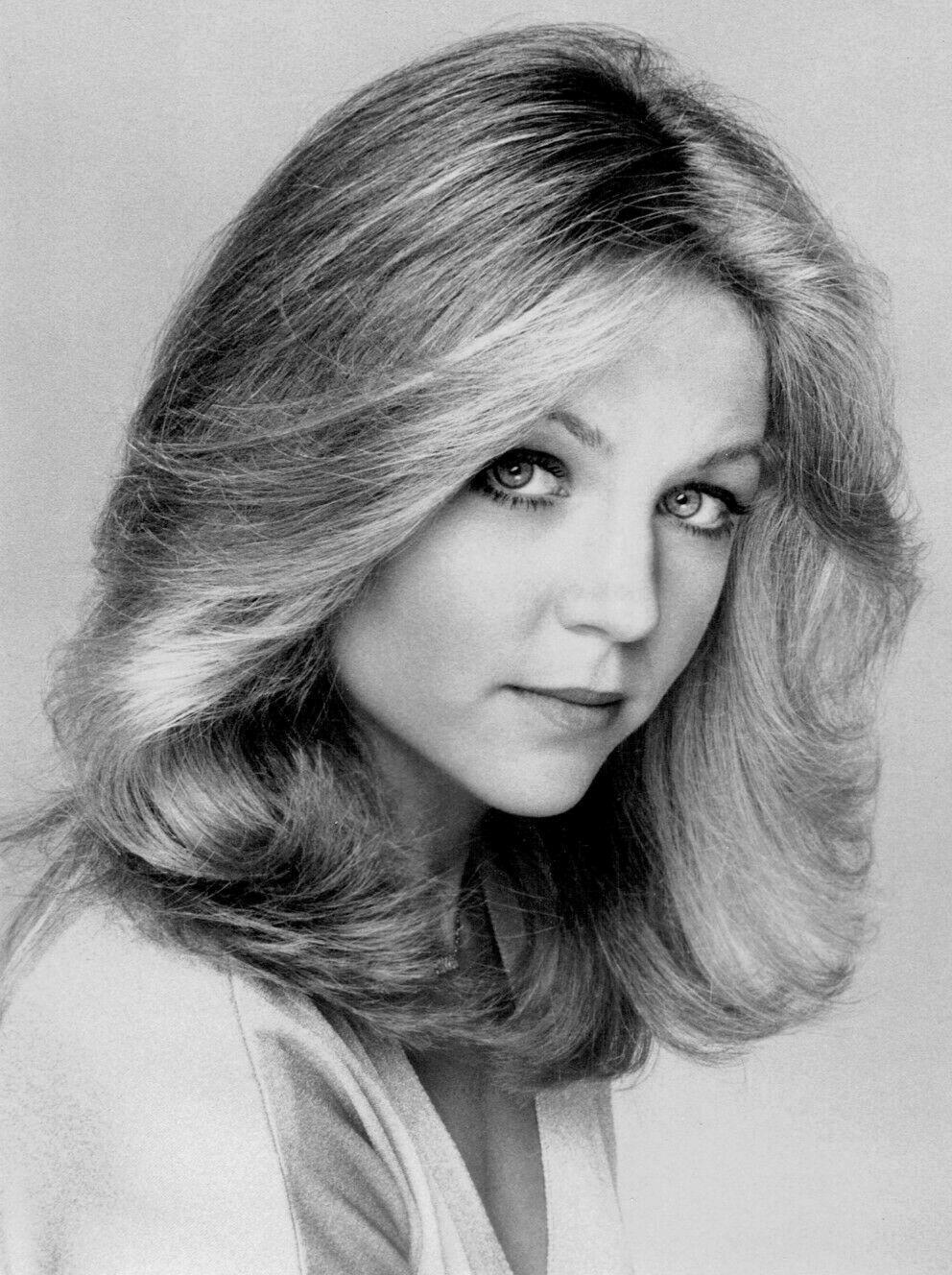
- Hartman in 1977
- Born: Lisa Hartman; June 1, 1956 (age 70); Houston, Texas, U.S.
- Occupations: Actress; singer
- Years active: 1976–present
- Spouse: Clint Black (m. 1991)
- Children: 1

Lisa Hartman Black (born June 1, 1956) is an American actress and singer from Houston, Texas.

Hartman gained prominence after her role in the prime time drama Knots Landing from 1982 to 1986. She recorded four solo albums between 1976 and 1987, with her most notable song being "If Love Must Go". She achieved significant success with a duet with her husband, country singer Clint Black, called "When I Said I Do", which reached number one on the Billboard Hot Country Singles & Tracks charts in 1999. Hartman has appeared in various films and TV shows, including Flicka: Country Pride, Back to You and Me, and The Masked Singer. She married Black in 1991, and the couple has a daughter, Lily Pearl Black. They have lived in Nashville, Tennessee, since 2002.

== Career ==
After some minor television appearances, Hartman starred on the short-lived Bewitched spin-off, Tabitha during 1977–78. She subsequently appeared frequently on television in guest roles, and appeared in the 1981 CBS TV remake of Jacqueline Susann's Valley of the Dolls, as Neely O'Hara. She was on WLS-TV's 1979 special "You're Never Too Old" recorded at Marriott's Great America in Gurnee, Illinois.

Hartman's breakthrough as an actress came in 1982 when she began appearing on the prime time drama Knots Landing, playing rock singer Ciji Dunne. Her character engaged in romances with the characters played by Ted Shackelford and Michael Sabatino. Hartman was popular with audiences, and when Ciji was murdered off-screen in 1983, there was a public uproar. As a solution, Hartman was brought back on the show as Cathy Geary, also a singer, who later marries an unbalanced televangelist played by a young Alec Baldwin. She also had a brief romance with Doug Sheehan's character Ben Gibson. Hartman remained with the show until 1986, when she was released due to budget cuts and because the show's writers felt there were no further storylines for her character. During her time on the series, she appeared in the film Where the Boys Are '84 produced by Allan Carr. She also sang the film's theme song.

Hartman recorded four solo albums between 1976 and 1987 – two for Kirshner Records, one for RCA Records, and one for Atlantic Records. Her most notable song is "If Love Must Go", which she performed on various television shows like Solid Gold and The Merv Griffin Show. Despite additional contributions from successful songwriters and producers including Jeff Barry, Dobie Gray, Bryan Adams, Rick Springfield, Will Jennings, and Holly Knight, the albums were not commercially successful. She achieved her most notable success with a duet with her husband entitled "When I Said I Do". It reached Number 1 on the Billboard Hot Country Singles & Tracks charts on December 18, 1999, and was nominated for a Grammy Award. The duet was ranked No. 11 on CMT's 100 Greatest Duets in Country Music in 2005. They recorded a second duet titled "Easy For Me to Say", which peaked at No. 27 on the country music charts in 2002.

In the summer of 1994, Hartman co-hosted Universal Studios Summer Blast, a TV special celebrating the 30th anniversary of Universal Studios.

In April 2011, her albums Lisa Hartman, Hold On and Letterock were released on CD with bonus tracks by Wounded Bird Records under license from Sony. Her last album, 'Til My Heart Stops was reissued on CD in 2008 on Wounded Bird Records as well.

In May 2012, Hartman starred in Flicka: Country Pride, a movie from Twentieth Century Fox Home Entertainment. She plays the mother of a budding equestrian rider (Kacey Rohl).

In 2005, Hartman starred in a made-for-TV film, Back to You and Me, on the Hallmark Channel.

In 2020, she and husband Clint Black appeared in season four of The Masked Singer as "Snow Owls", notably competing as the series' first duet competitors while riding in an egg-shaped vehicle.

== Personal life ==
Hartman grew up in Houston, Texas. In 1991, she married musician Clint Black. They have a daughter, born in 2001. They have lived in Nashville, Tennessee, since 2002 after living in Laurel Canyon, Los Angeles, California. Hartman briefly dated actor, stuntman, and assistant director Gary Davis during the late 1980s.

== Discography ==
=== Studio albums ===
Title	Album details
Lisa Hartman	Release date: 1976; Label: Kirshner Records
Hold On	Release date: May 11, 1979; Label: Kirshner Records
Letterock	Release date: July 27, 1982; Label: RCA Records
Lisa Hartman (Reissue of Letterock)	Release date: 1983; Label: RCA Records
'Til My Heart Stops	Release date: August 24, 1987; Label: Atlantic Records

=== Singles ===
Year	Single	Album
1976	"Kentucky Rainbows"	Lisa Hartman
1976	"Saying Hello, Saying I Love You"	Lisa Hartman
1976	"Pickin Up the Pieces"	Lisa Hartman
1979	"Walk Away"	Hold On
1982	"If Love Must Go"	Letterock
1982	"Hiding From Love"	Letterock
1982	"Johnny's Always On My Mind"	Letterock
1984	"Where the Boys Are"	Where the Boys Are '84 soundtrack
1987	"Tempt Me (If You Want To)"	'Til My Heart Stops
1988	"The Dress"	'Til My Heart Stops
1988	"I Don't Need Love"	'Til My Heart Stops

=== Featured singles ===
Year	Single	Artist	Peak chart positions			Album
Year	Single	Artist	US Country	US	CAN Country	Album
1999	"When I Said I Do"	Clint Black	1	31	1	D'lectrified
2001	"Easy for Me to Say"	Clint Black	27	—	*	Greatest Hits II
2016	"You Still Get to Me"	Clint Black	—	—	—	On Purpose
"—" denotes releases that did not chart * denotes unknown peak positions

=== Music videos ===
Year	Video	Director
1988	"I Don't Need Love"	
1999	"When I Said I Do" (with Clint Black)	Clint Black
2001	"Easy for Me to Say" (with Clint Black)	Clint Black
2016	"You Still Get to Me" (with Clint Black)	Ben Boutwell

== Filmography ==
=== Films ===
Year	Title	Role	Notes
1977	Murder at the World Series	Stewardess	TV movie
1978	Just Tell Me You Love Me	Julie	
1980	Valentine Magic on Love Island	Crystal Kramer	TV movie
1980	Where the Ladies Go	Crystal	TV movie
1980	Gridlock	Nikki	TV movie
1981	Deadly Blessing	Faith Stohler	
1982	Scared Silly	Darcy Winfield	TV movie
1984	Where the Boys Are '84	Jennie Cooper	
1985	Beverly Hills Cowgirl Blues	Amanda Ryder	TV movie
1985	The 17th Bride	Liza	
1987	Roses Are for the Rich	Autumn McAvin Norton Corbett Osborne	TV movie
1987	Student Exchange	Peggy	TV movie
1989	Full Exposure: The Sex Tapes Scandal	Sarah Dutton	TV movie
1990	The Operation	Laura Parks	TV movie
1990	The Take	Delaney	TV movie
1991	Bare Essentials	Sydney Wayne	TV movie
1991	Not of This World	Linda Fletcher	TV movie
1991	Fire: Trapped on the 37th Floor	Susan Lowell	TV movie
1991	Red Wind	Kristine "Kris" Morrow	TV movie
1991	Perfect Crimes	Dr. Lori Forman	TV movie
1991	The Return of Eliot Ness	Madeline Whitfield	TV movie
1993	Without a Kiss Goodbye	Laurie Samuels	TV movie
1994	Search for Grace	Ivy / Grace	TV movie
1994	Someone Else's Child	Cory Maddox	TV movie
1995	Dazzle	Juanita 'Jazz' Kilkullen	TV movie
1996	Have You Seen My Son	Lael Pritcher	TV movie
1997	Out of Nowhere	Lauren Carlton	TV movie
1998	Still Holding On: The Legend of Cadillac Jack	Ponder Favor	TV movie
2005	Back to You and Me	Dr. Sydney "Syd" Ludwick	TV movie
2012	Flicka: Country Pride	Lindy Jenkins	Direct-to-video

=== Television ===
Year	Title	Role	Notes
1977	Police Woman	Evelyn	Episode: "Night of the Full Moon"
1977–78	Tabitha	Tabitha Stephens	Main cast (11 episodes)
1978	Fantasy Island	Chris Malone	Episode: "The Prince/The Sheriff"
1978	The Redd Foxx Comedy Hour	Herself	Episode 4
1979	The Love Boat	Sherry	Episode: "Disco Baby" (Part 1 & 2)
1979	Fantasy Island	Sister Mary Theresa / Mary Hoyt	Episode: "Pentagram/Casting Director/A Little Ball"
1979	The Lisa Hartman Show	Herself / Host	TV pilot episode
1979	The Love Boat	Carol Bowers	Episode: "Alaska Wedding Cruise: Carol and Doug's Story" (Part 1 & 2)
1979	Fantasy Island	Gladys Boylin	Episode: "Magnolia Blossoms"
1979	Vega$	Diana Payne	Episode: "Shadow on a Star"
1980	Fantasy Island	Sharon Sanders	Episode: "Terrors of the Mind"
1981	The Love Boat	Toni Pataccio	Episode: "First Voyage, Last Voyage"
1981	Fantasy Island	Sheila Richards	Episode: "Chorus Girl"
1981	Aloha Paradise	Katie	Episode: "The Star/The Trouble with Chester/Fran´s Worst Friend"
1981	Jacqueline Susann's Valley of the Dolls	Neely O'Hara	TV miniseries (2 episodes)
1982	T. J. Hooker	Allison Baker	Episode: "The Witness"
1982	Scared Silly	Darcy Winfield / Marie Winfield	TV pilot episode
1982–83	Knots Landing	Ciji Dunne	Supporting cast (17 episodes)
1983	High Performance	Kate Flannery	Main cast (4 episodes)
1983–86	Knots Landing	Cathy Geary Rush	Main cast (79 episodes)
1988	Matlock	Shelby Russell	Episode: "The Ambassador" (Part 1 & 2)
1989	The Hitchhiker	Cheryl	Episode: "Her Finest Hour"
1991	Perfect Crimes	Dr. Lori Forman	TV pilot episode
1992	2000 Malibu Road	Jade O'Keefe	Main cast (6 episodes)
1995	Judith Krantz's Dazzle	Juanita "Jazz" Kilkullen	TV miniseries (2 episodes)
2000	King of the Hill	Herself (voice)	Episode: "Peggy's Fan Fair"
2005	Knots Landing Reunion: Together Again	Herself / Ciji Dunne / Cathy Geary	TV special
2020	The Masked Singer	Snow Owl	7 Episodes; with husband Clint

== Awards and nominations ==
Year	Association	Category	Result
1999	Academy of Country Music Awards	Vocal Event of the Year - "When I Said I Do" (with Clint Black)	Won
2000	42nd Grammy Awards	Best Country Collaboration with Vocals - "When I Said I Do" (with Clint Black)	Nominated
