= The Kentucky Headhunters discography =

- Studio albums: 9
- Compilation albums: 6
- Singles: 27
- Music videos: 14

The Kentucky Headhunters are an American country rock & southern rock band founded in 1968 as Itchy Brother. The band's discography comprises nine studio albums, six compilation albums, two video compilations and 27 singles. Of their albums, their 1989 debut Pickin' on Nashville is certified double platinum in the United States and Canada, while 1991's Electric Barnyard has a gold certification in both countries. Of the band's singles, four have reached Top 40 on the U.S. Billboard Hot Country Songs charts. Their highest chart peak is the number 8 "Oh Lonesome Me", which was originally a Number One single for Don Gibson.

== Studio albums ==
=== 1980s and 1990s ===
| Title | Album details | Peak chart positions | | | Certifications (sales threshold) |
| Title | Album details | US Country | US | CAN | Certifications (sales threshold) |
|---|---|---|---|---|---|
| Pickin' on Nashville | Release date: October 17, 1989; Label: Mercury Records; Formats: CD, cassette, LP | 2 | 41 | — | CAN: 2× Platinum; US: 2× Platinum |
| Electric Barnyard | Release date: April 2, 1991; Label: Mercury Records; Formats: CD, cassette | 3 | 29 | 79 | CAN: Gold; US: Gold |
| Rave On! | Release date: 1993; Label: Mercury Records; Formats: CD, cassette | 22 | 102 | — | |
| Stompin' Grounds | Release date: April 29, 1997; Label: BNA Records; Formats: CD, cassette | — | — | — | |
"—" denotes releases that did not chart

=== 2000s – 2020s ===
| Title | Album details | Peak positions |
| Title | Album details | US Country |
|---|---|---|
| Songs from the Grass String Ranch | Release date: June 13, 2000; Label: Audium Entertainment; Formats: CD, cassette | — |
| Soul | Release date: May 6, 2003; Label: Audium Entertainment; Formats: CD | — |
| Big Boss Man | Release date: June 21, 2005; Label: CBuJ Entertainment; Formats: CD | — |
| Dixie Lullabies | Release date: October 18, 2011; Label: Red Dirt; Formats: CD | 75 |
| On Safari | Release date: November 4, 2016; Label: Plowboy; Formats: CD, music download | — |
| That's a Fact Jack! | Release date: October 2, 2021; Label: Practice House; Formats: CD, music download | — |
"—" denotes releases that did not chart

== Compilation albums ==
| Title | Album details |
|---|---|
| The Best of The Kentucky Headhunters: Still Pickin' | Release date: September 20, 1994; Label: Mercury Records; Formats: CD, cassette |
| Flying Under the Radar | Release date: June 13, 2006; Label: CBuJ Entertainment; Formats: CD |
| Authorized Bootleg: Live – Agara Ballroom – Cleveland, Ohio | Release date: September 22, 2009; Label: Mercury Records Nashville; Formats: CD |
| The Kentucky Headhunters | Release date: December 8, 2011; Label: Hickory Records; Formats: music download |
| Snapshot: Kentucky Headhunters | Release date: June 23, 2014; Label: Hickory Records; Formats: CD, music download |
| Dixie Fried : The Best of The Mercury Years | Release date: October 12, 2018; Label: Wrasse Records; Formats: CD, music download |
| Live at the Ramblin' Man Fair | Release date: January 11, 2019; Label: Alligator Records; Formats: CD, music download |

== Collaborative albums ==
| Title | Album details |
|---|---|
| That'll Work (with Johnnie Johnson) | Release date: August 17, 1993; Label: Elektra/Nonesuch; Formats: CD, cassette |
| Meet Me in Bluesland (with Johnnie Johnson) | Release date: June 2, 2015; Label: Alligator Records; Formats: CD, music download |

== Singles ==
=== 1970s – 1990s ===
| Year | Single | Peak chart positions | | Album |
| Year | Single | US Country | CAN Country | Album |
|---|---|---|---|---|
| 1973 | "Shotgun Effie" (as Itchy Brother) | — | — | —N/a |
| 1989 | "Walk Softly on This Heart of Mine" | 25 | — | Pickin' on Nashville |
| 1990 | "Dumas Walker" | 15 | 54 | Pickin' on Nashville |
| 1990 | "Oh Lonesome Me" | 8 | 19 | Pickin' on Nashville |
| 1990 | "Rock 'n' Roll Angel" | 23 | 30 | Pickin' on Nashville |
| 1991 | "The Ballad of Davy Crockett" | 49 | 82 | Electric Barnyard |
| 1991 | "With Body and Soul" | 56 | 30 | Electric Barnyard |
| 1991 | "It's Chitlin' Time" | 63 | 88 | Electric Barnyard |
| 1991 | "Only Daddy That'll Walk the Line" | 60 | — | Electric Barnyard |
| 1992 | "Let's Work Together" | — | — | Harley Davidson and the Marlboro Man (soundtrack) |
| 1993 | "Honky Tonk Walkin'" | 54 | 77 | Rave On!! |
| 1993 | "Blue Moon of Kentucky" | — | — | Rave On!! |
| 1993 | "Dixie Fried" | 71 | — | Rave On!! |
| 1994 | "Sunday Blues" (with Johnnie Johnson) | — | — | That'll Work |
| 1994 | "Stumblin" (with Johnnie Johnson) | — | — | That'll Work |
| 1994 | "You've Got to Hide Your Love Away" | — | — | Shared Vision: The Songs of the Beatles |
| 1997 | "Singin' the Blues" | 70 | — | Stompin' Grounds |
"—" denotes releases that did not chart

=== 2000s – 2020s ===
| Year | Single | Peak positions | Album |
| Year | Single | US Country | Album |
|---|---|---|---|
| 2000 | "Too Much to Lose" | 66 | Songs from the Grass String Ranch |
| 2001 | "Louisianna CoCo" | — | Songs from the Grass String Ranch |
| 2002 | "Love That Woman" | — | Songs from the Grass String Ranch |
| 2003 | "Lonely Nights" | — | Soul |
| 2005 | "Big Boss Man" | — | Big Boss Man |
| 2006 | "Chug-a-Lug" | — | Big Boss Man |
| 2006 | "Take These Chains from My Heart" | — | Big Boss Man |
| 2011 | "Great Acoustics" | — | Dixie Lullabies |
| 2016 | "Crazy Jim" | — | On Safari |
| 2017 | "God Loves a Rolling Stone" | — | On Safari |
| 2018 | "Beaver Creek Mansion" | — | On Safari |
| 2021 | "How Could I" | — | That's a Fact Jack! |
| 2021 | "That's a Fact Jack" | — | That's a Fact Jack! |
"—" denotes releases that did not chart

== Videography ==
=== Music videos ===
| Year | Video | Director |
|---|---|---|
| 1989 | "Walk Softly on This Heart of Mine" | John Lloyd Miller |
| 1990 | "Dumas Walker" | John Lloyd Miller |
| 1990 | "Oh Lonesome Me" | John Lloyd Miller |
| 1991 | "The Ballad of Davy Crockett" | John Lloyd Miller |
| 1991 | "It's Chitlin' Time" | Sherman Halsey |
| 1991 | "Only Daddy That'll Walk the Line" | Retta Harvey |
| 1992 | "Let's Work Together" | Simon Wincer |
| 1993 | "Honky Tonk Walkin'" | John Lloyd Miller |
| 1993 | "Dixie Fried" | John Lloyd Miller |
| 1997 | "Singin' the Blues" | John Lloyd Miller |
| 2000 | "Too Much to Lose" | Brent Hedgecock |
| 2001 | "Louisianna CoCo" | Jerad Sloan |
| 2005 | "Big Boss Man" | Stephen Shepherd |
| 2012 | "Great Acoustics" | Stacie Huckeba |
| 2015 | "Stumblin'" | Norry Niven |

=== Video compilations ===
| Title | Album details | Certifications (sales threshold) |
|---|---|---|
| Pickin' on Nashville: Videos | Release date: July 1, 1991; Label: Mercury Records; Formats: VHS | US: Gold |
| Best Pickin's | Release date: October 18, 1994; Label: Mercury Records; Formats: VHS | |
