= The Best of The Kentucky Headhunters: Still Pickin' =

Compilation album by The Kentucky Headhunters
- Released: September 20, 1994
- Genre: Country rock, Southern rock
- Length: 45:33
- Label: Mercury
- Producer: The Kentucky Headhunters

The Kentucky Headhunters chronology
That'll Work (1993)	The Best of The Kentucky Headhunters: Still Pickin' (1994)	Stompin' Grounds (1997)

Professional ratings
Review scores
Source	Rating
Allmusic	link

The Best of The Kentucky Headhunters: Still Pickin' is a greatest hits album released by American southern rock/country rock band The Kentucky Headhunters. It was the first album collection of hits from the band's career up to that point. The album includes tracks from their first three studio albums, as well as "Let's Work Together" (from the soundtrack to Harley Davidson and the Marlboro Man) and a cover of "You've Got to Hide Your Love Away."

== Content ==
The album reprises tracks from the band's first three albums. "Dumas Walker", "Walk Softly on This Heart of Mine", "Rock 'n' Roll Angel" and "Oh Lonesome Me" are from The Kentucky Headhunters' 1989 debut Pickin' on Nashville; "The Ballad of Davy Crockett", "Only Daddy That'll Walk the Line", "It's Chitlin' Time" and a cover of Norman Greenbaum's "Spirit in the Sky" from Electric Barnyard; and "Honky Tonk Walkin'", "Dixie Fried" and "Redneck Girl" from Rave On!!. "Let's Work Together" was originally included on the soundtrack to the film Harley Davidson and the Marlboro Man, and a cover of The Beatles' "You've Got to Hide Your Love Away" was also included on the 1994 tribute album Shared Vision: The Songs of the Beatles.

== Track listing ==
No.	Title	Writer(s)	Source album	Length
1.	"Dumas Walker"	Greg Martin, Doug Phelps, Ricky Lee Phelps, Fred Young, Richard Young	Pickin' on Nashville	2:50
2.	"Walk Softly on This Heart of Mine"	Bill Monroe	Pickin' on Nashville	3:44
3.	"Rock 'n' Roll Angel"	R. Young	Pickin' on Nashville	3:51
4.	"Oh Lonesome Me"	Don Gibson	Pickin' on Nashville	3:09
5.	"The Ballad of Davy Crockett"	George Bruns, Tom W. Blackburn	Electric Barnyard	2:34
6.	"Only Daddy That'll Walk the Line"	Ivy J. "Jimmy" Bryant	Electric Barnyard	3:10
7.	"It's Chitlin' Time"	Martin, D. Phelps, R.L. Phelps, F. Young, R. Young	Electric Barnyard	2:20
8.	"Spirit in the Sky"	Norman Greenbaum	Electric Barnyard	4:21
9.	"Let's Work Together"	Wilbert Harrison	Harley Davidson and the Marlboro Man Original Motion Picture Soundtrack	2:18
10.	"Honky Tonk Walkin'"	Anthony Kenney, Martin, Mark S. Orr, F. Young, R. Young	Rave On!!	3:46
11.	"Dixie Fried"	Carl Perkins, Howard Griffin	Rave On!!	2:10
12.	"Redneck Girl"	Kenney, Martin, Orr, F. Young, R. Young	Rave On!!	2:26
13.	"You've Got to Hide Your Love Away"	John Lennon, Paul McCartney	new for this release; later appears on Shared Vision: The Songs of the Beatles	4:21

== Personnel ==
The Kentucky Headhunters

- Greg Martin – electric guitar, slide guitar, background vocals
- Doug Phelps – bass guitar, background vocals^{A}
- Ricky Lee Phelps – lead vocals, harmonica, percussion^{A}
- Fred Young – drums, percussion, background vocals
- Richard Young – rhythm guitar, background vocals
- Anthony Kenney – bass guitar, background vocals^{B}
- Mark S. Orr – lead vocals, background vocals^{B}
- ^{A}Performed only on tracks 1–9.
- ^{B}Performed only on tracks 10–13.

Additional musicians

- David Wayne Jessie – tambourine on "Honky Tonk Walkin'"
- Richard Ripani – piano on "Honky Tonk Walkin'"
