= Authorized Bootleg: Live – Agara Ballroom – Cleveland, Ohio =

Authorized Bootleg: Live – Agora Ballroom – Cleveland, Ohio

Live album by The Kentucky Headhunters
- Released: September 22, 2009
- Recorded: May 13, 1990
- Genre: Country
- Label: Mercury Nashville
- Producer: The Kentucky Headhunters

The Kentucky Headhunters chronology
Flying Under the Radar (2005)	Authorized Bootleg: Live – Agora Ballroom – Cleveland, Ohio (2009)	Dixie Lullabies (2011)

Authorized Bootleg: Live – Agora Ballroom – Cleveland, Ohio is a live album by the Kentucky Headhunters. It was recorded in 1990 but not released until 2009 by Mercury Records Nashville, the label to which the band was signed in the early 1990s.

William Ruhlmnann of AllMusic rated the album 4 out of 5 stars, saying that "Whatever they play, whether it's nominally a country song, a pop song, a blues song, or one of their own cross-genre originals, it comes out sounding like gutbucket rock & roll in a Rolling Stones vein, even if the voices have Southern accents."

== Track listing ==
1. "Honky Tonk Blues" (Hank Williams) — 2:57
2. "Rag Top" (Doug Phelps, Ricky Lee Phelps) — 3:04
3. "Some Folks Like to Steal" (Greg Martin, Fred Young, Richard Young) — 2:55
4. "Oh Lonesome Me" (Don Gibson) — 3:20
5. "She's About a Mover" (Doug Sahm) — 7:48
6. "Walk Softly on This Heart of Mine" (Bill Monroe, Jake Landers) — 4:13
7. "Rock 'N' Roll Angel" (R. Young) — 4:02
8. "Dizzy, Miss Lizzy" (Larry Williams) — 3:29
9. "High Steppin' Daddy" (Ralph Wade Martin) — 2:54
10. "Smooth" (R. L. Phelps, Samuel Edward Crowe) — 3:48
11. "Dumas Walker" (Martin, D. Phelps, R. L. Phelps, F. Young, R. Young) — 3:01
12. "My Daddy Was a Milkman" (Martin, D. Phelps, R. L. Phelps, F. Young, R. Young) — 4:03
13. "Crossroads" (Robert Johnson) — 6:13
14. "Take Me Back/Old Kentucky Home" (Martin, D. Phelps, R. L. Phelps, F. Young, R. Young) — 6:42
15. "Wishin' Well" (F. Young, R. Young, Anthony Kenney) — 3:05
16. "Spirit in the Sky" (Norman Greenbaum) — 5:34
