= 1990 Country Music Association Awards =

Annual US music awards ceremony

- Date: October 8, 1990
- Location: Grand Ole Opry House, Nashville, Tennessee
- Hosted by: Reba McEntire; Randy Travis
- Most wins: Garth Brooks; Kentucky HeadHunters (2 each)
- Most nominations: Garth Brooks (5)

Television/radio coverage
- Network: CBS

The 1990 Country Music Association Awards, 24th Ceremony, was held on Monday October 8, 1990, at the Grand Ole Opry House, Nashville, Tennessee, and was hosted by CMA Award Winners, Reba McEntire and Randy Travis.

== Winners and nominees ==
Winners are in Bold.

| Entertainer of the Year | Album of the Year |
|---|---|
| **George Strait**; Clint Black; Kathy Mattea; Randy Travis; Ricky Van Shelton | **Pickin' on Nashville — Kentucky HeadHunters**; Here in the Real World — Alan Jackson; I Wonder Do You Think of Me — Keith Whitley; Livin' It Up — George Strait; RVS III — Ricky Van Shelton |
| Male Vocalist of the Year | Female Vocalist of the Year |
| **Clint Black**; Garth Brooks; Rodney Crowell; Ricky Van Shelton; George Strait | **Kathy Mattea**; Patty Loveless; Reba McEntire; Lorrie Morgan; Tanya Tucker |
| Vocal Group of the Year | Vocal Duo of the Year |
| **Kentucky HeadHunters**; Desert Rose Band; Highway 101; Restless Heart; Shenandoah | **The Judds**; Baillie & The Boys; Bellamy Brothers; Foster & Lloyd; Sweethearts of the Rodeo |
| Single of the Year | Song of the Year |
| **"When I Call Your Name" — Vince Gill**; "Here In The Real World" — Alan Jackson; "If Tomorrow Never Comes" — Garth Brooks; "Killin' Time" — Clint Black; "Where've You Been" — Kathy Mattea | **"Where've You Been" — Don Henry and Jon Vezner**; "Here In The Real World" — Alan Jackson and Mark Irwin; "If Tomorrow Never Comes" — Garth Brooks and Kent Blazy; "Killin' Time" — Clint Black and Hayden Nicholas; "When I Call Your Name" — Vince Gill and Tim DuBois |
| Horizon Award | Musician of the Year |
| **Garth Brooks**; Alan Jackson; Kentucky HeadHunters; Lorrie Morgan; Travis Tritt | **Johnny Gimble**; Jerry Douglas; Paul Franklin; Mark O'Connor; Matt Rollings |
| Music Video of the Year | Vocal Event of the Year |
| **The Dance — Garth Brooks**; Dumas Walker — Kentucky HeadHunters; He Walked on Water — Randy Travis; Hillbilly Rock — Marty Stuart; Where've You Been — Kathy Mattea | **Til A Tear Becomes A Rose — Keith Whitley and Lorrie Morgan**; Highwaymen — Willie Nelson, Kris Kristofferson, Johnny Cash and Waylon Jennings; Oklahoma Swing — Reba McEntire and Vince Gill; Tanya Tucker and T. Graham Brown; Willie Nelson and Emmylou Harris |

== Hall of Fame ==
Country Music Hall of Fame Inductees
- Tennessee Ernie Ford

== Performers ==
| Artist(s) | Song(s) |
|---|---|
| The Judds | "This Country's Rockin" |
| Tanya Tucker and T. Graham Brown | "Don't Go Out" |
| Alan Jackson | "Chasin' That Neon Rainbow" |
| Clint Black | "Put Yourself in My Shoes" |
| Lorrie Morgan | "Out of Your Shoes" |
| Mary Chapin Carpenter | "Opening Act" |
| Ricky Van Shelton | Tribute to Jerry Lee Lewis "Great Balls of Fire" |
| Garth Brooks | "Friends in Low Places" |
| Vince Gill (with Patty Loveless) | "When I Call Your Name" |
| Kathy Mattea | "Time Passes By" |
| Travis Tritt | "Put Some Drive in Your Country" |
| Randy Travis; George Jones; Tammy Wynette; Roy Rogers; Vern Gosdin | "A Few Good Ol' Country Boys Around" "Heroes and Friends" |
| The Kentucky Headhunters | "Oh, Lonesome Me" |
| George Strait | "I've Come to Expect It from You" |
| Reba McEntire | "You Lie" |
| The Oak Ridge Boys | Tribute to Tennessee Ernie Ford "Just a Closer Walk with Thee" "Sixteen Tons" |
| U.S Air Force Academy Cadet Chorale; Reba McEntire; Randy Travis; Vince Gill; The Judds; Lee Greenwood | "This Is My Country" "America (My Country, 'Tis of Thee)" "Battle Hymn of the Republic" "God Bless America" "America the Beautiful" "God Bless the U.S.A." |

== Presenters ==
| Presenter(s) | Award |
|---|---|
| Tanya Tucker and T. Graham Brown | Single of the Year |
| Marie Osmond | Vocal Event of the Year |
| Ray Stevens | Song of the Year |
| Mary Chapin Carpenter | Vocal Group of the Year |
| Crystal Gayle and Lyle Lovett | Album of the Year |
| Patty Loveless and Vince Gill | Vocal Duo of the Year |
| K. T. Oslin | Male Vocalist of the Year |
| Reba McEntire | Musician of the Year |
| Reba McEntire | Music Video of the Year |
| Clint Black | Horizon Award |
| Roger Miller | Female Vocalist of the Year |
| Barbara Mandrell | Entertainer of the Year |
