= Meet Me in Bluesland =

Studio album by The Kentucky Headhunters and Johnnie Johnson
- Released: June 2, 2015
- Recorded: 2003
- Genre: Country rock; blues
- Label: Alligator
- Producer: The Kentucky Headhunters

The Kentucky Headhunters chronology
Dixie Lullabies (2011)	Meet Me in Bluesland (2015)	On Safari (2016)

Meet Me in Bluesland is a 2015 album by American southern rock band The Kentucky Headhunters and blues musician Johnnie Johnson. Recorded in 2003 during the sessions for the Kentucky Headhunters' 2003 album Soul, it was not released until 2015, ten years after Johnson's death.

== History ==
The Kentucky Headhunters had planned to include Johnson on their 2003 album Soul; in the process of recording, the band created multiple songs with Johnson spontaneously. The recordings were not initially planned to be released, due to their nature. The album is the band's second collaboration with Johnson, the first being 1993's That'll Work. Included on the album are a re-recording of "Stumblin'" from that album, along with a cover of Chuck Berry's "Little Queenie".

== Critical reception ==
Grant Britt of No Depression reviewed the album positively, comparing the sound favorably to that of Chuck Berry while praising Doug Phelps's lead vocals.

== Track listing ==
All tracks written by The Kentucky Headhunters (Anthony Kenney, Greg Martin, Doug Phelps, Fred Young, Richard Young) and Johnnie Johnson, except as noted.

1. "Stumblin'" (Johnson, Kenney, Martin, Mark S. Orr, F. Young, R. Young) - 3:08
2. "Walking with the Wolf" - 3:28
3. "Little Queenie" (Chuck Berry) - 3:31
4. "She's Got to Have It" - 3:18
5. "Party in Heaven" (Kenney, Martin, Phelps, F. Young, R. Young) - 3:28
6. "Meet Me in Bluesland" - 5:44
7. "King Rooster" - 4:31
8. "Shufflin' Back to Memphis" - 4:50
9. "Fast Train" - 3:34
  - instrumental
10. "Sometime" - 3:55
11. "Superman Blues" - 4:02

== Personnel ==
- Doug Phelps - rhythm guitar, lead vocals (1, 5, 7, 8, 10)
- Johnnie Johnson - piano, lead vocals (track 4)
- Anthony Kenney - bass guitar, backing vocals
- Greg Martin - lead guitar, backing vocals
- Fred Young - drums, backing vocals
- Richard Young - rhythm guitar, lead vocals (2, 3, 6, 11)
