= Rave On (disambiguation) =

"Rave On" is a 1958 song by Sonny West, also recorded by Buddy Holly.

Rave On may also refer to:

- Rave On! (album), a 1993 album by The Kentucky Headhunters
- Rave On, book by Nigel Robinson
- "Rave On John Donne/Rave On Part Two", a 1983 song by Van Morrison from Live at the Grand Opera House Belfast
- "Rave On", a 1989 song by Happy Mondays from Madchester Rave On
- "Rave On", a 2005 song from the Killer7 soundtrack
