= Glenn Douglas Tubb =

American songwriter (1935–2021)

- Born: June 29, 1935
- Died: May 22, 2021 (aged 85)
- Spouse: Dottie Snow Tubb
- Relatives: Ernest Tubb (uncle)

Glenn Douglas Tubb (June 29, 1935 – May 22, 2021) was an American songwriter from San Antonio, Texas. He was a nephew of Ernest Tubb and married to Dottie Snow Tubb.

== Biography ==
The song "Skip a Rope" written by him and Jack Moran, performed by Henson Cargill was nominated for a Grammy in 1969.

Glenn Douglas Tubb is a nephew of Ernest Tubb and performed at The Ernest Tubb Record Shop Texas Troubadour Theater Midnite Jamboree. In addition to "Skip A Rope", he co-wrote the hit "Home of the Blues" with Johnny Cash, and he co-wrote the George Jones and Tammy Wynette hit "Two Story House", with Dave Lindsey and Tammy Wynette. He wrote a gospel song for Johnny Cash titled "I Talk To Jesus Every Day" that was later recorded by Bob Dylan and others. He also wrote an unrecorded song that Hank Williams left behind when he died, titled "Heartbroken, Forsaken And Alone." He was also asked to finish writing the last song that Johnny Cash was working on when he died titled, "My Lord Has Gone." Tubb turned 85 in 2020 and continued writing and singing until his death in May 2021.

In his early career, Glenn did not use his last name of Tubb, he recorded under the name of Glenn Douglas for Dot Records and for Decca Records, where he produced an album and several singles. He recorded under the name of Glenn Douglas Tubb, when he recorded for MGM Records and Mercury Records. In the 1950s, he toured with Johnny Cash, Jerry Lee Lewis, Carl Perkins, George Jones, Marty Robbins and many others. He appeared on The Friday Night Frolicks, which later became the Friday Night Opry, and he also appeared on Red Foley's Ozark Jubilee, one of the first national country music television shows. He was still recording his songs, both gospel and country. Tubb also sang duets with his wife, Dottie.

Tubb and his wife were ministers, and they broadcast their church service called 'The Kitchen Tabernacle' on the internet on "Facebook Live" and "Periscope" each Sunday afternoon. The program is viewed all over the world.
