= The Kentucky Headhunters =

American country rock and Southern rock band

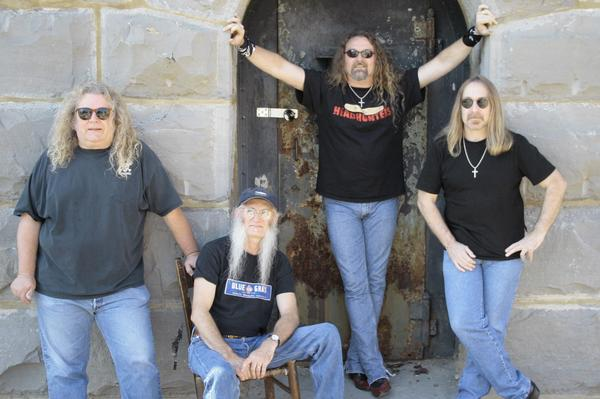
- The Kentucky Headhunters in 2009. From left to right: Richard Young, Fred Young, Doug Phelps, Greg Martin. Photograph by Brad U. Wheeler

Background information
- Origin: Edmonton, Kentucky, U.S.
- Genres: Country rock; Southern rock
- Works: The Kentucky Headhunters discography
- Years active: 1986–present
- Labels: King Fargo; Swan Song; Mercury; BNA; Koch/Audium; CBuJ Entertainment; Red Dirt; Alligator; Plowboy; Pacific Ocean
- Spinoffs: Brother Phelps
- Spinoff of: Itchy Brother
- Members: Greg Martin; Doug Phelps; Fred Young; Richard Young
- Past members: Ricky Lee Phelps; Anthony Kenney; Mark S. Orr
- Website: www.kentuckyheadhunters.com

The Kentucky Headhunters are an American country rock and Southern rock band from Edmonton, Kentucky. The band's members are Doug Phelps (bass guitar, vocals), Greg Martin (lead guitar, vocals), and brothers Richard Young (rhythm guitar, vocals) and Fred Young (drums, vocals). Martin and the Young brothers began performing in 1968 as Itchy Brother, a group which also included Anthony Kenney on bass guitar and vocals. Itchy Brother performed until 1982, with James Harrison replacing Martin from 1973 to 1976. The Youngs and Martin began performing as The Kentucky Headhunters in 1986, adding brothers Ricky Lee Phelps (lead vocals, harmonica) and Doug Phelps (bass guitar, vocals) to the membership.

With the release of their 1989 debut album Pickin' on Nashville via Mercury Records, the band charted four consecutive Top 40 country singles. A second album for Mercury, Electric Barnyard, did not do as well commercially, and the Phelps brothers left after its release to form Brother Phelps. Kenney re-joined and Mark S. Orr took over on lead vocals for 1993's Rave On!! and a compilation album entitled The Best of The Kentucky Headhunters: Still Pickin' before the band exited Mercury. Orr left and Doug Phelps rejoined in 1996 as lead vocalist for the album Stompin' Grounds. He also led on the Audium Entertainment albums Songs from the Grass String Ranch and Soul, as well as Big Boss Man and a second compilation, Flying Under the Radar, on CBuJ Entertainment. After Kenney's departure, Doug once again became the band's bass guitarist by the release of Dixie Lullabies, in 2011.

The Kentucky Headhunters have released ten studio albums, three compilations, and twenty-three singles. Their highest-peaking single is a cover of the Don Gibson song "Oh Lonesome Me," which the band took to number eight on the Billboard Hot Country Songs charts in 1990. In addition, the band has won three Country Music Association awards, an Academy of Country Music award, and a Grammy Award for Best Country Performance by a Duo or Group with Vocal, won in 1990 for Pickin' on Nashville.

== History ==
=== 1968–1982: Itchy Brother ===
Richard Young, his younger brother Fred Young, and their cousins Anthony Kenney and Greg Martin began performing music in the Youngs's and Kenney's hometown of Glasgow, Kentucky, in the 1960s.They founded a band called Itchy Brother, named after Fred's favorite cartoon character, from King Leonardo and His Short Subjects. The original lineup consisted of Richard Young on rhythm guitar, Fred Young on drums, Kenney on bass guitar, and Martin on lead guitar. Itchy Brother achieved regional success in Kentucky in the 1970s, including at least one single, "Shotgun Effie," which they wrote about the Youngs'a grandmother, Effie. It was released in 1973 on the King Fargo label. That same year, Greg Martin left the group to play in another band in his hometown of Louisville, Kentucky. In the meantime, guitarist James Harrison took his place. Martin returned to the group in 1976.

Itchy Brother was almost signed to Swan Song Records, an independent label founded by the band Led Zeppelin, in 1980. The label closed after Led Zeppelin drummer John Bonham died, and Itchy Brother never recorded a full album on Swan Song. Itchy Brother broke up in 1982. After their disbanding, Richard started writing songs for Acuff-Rose Music, and Fred became a backing musician for country singer Sylvia, who at the time was recording on RCA Records. Martin played bass guitar and sang backing vocals for Ronnie McDowell, then a recording artist for Curb Records, and Kenney stopped performing, although he continued to write songs with the Young brothers.

=== 1986–1990: Pickin' on Nashville ===
Martin reuinted with the Young brothers in 1986. As Kenney declined to join the three, Martin invited Missouri Bootheel native Doug Phelps, also a member of McDowell's band, to replace Kenney, and Doug brought his older brother Ricky Lee to sing lead vocals. The band decided to name themselves The Headhunters, taking the name from the term "headchopper," which blues musician Muddy Waters used to indicate that he had supplanted another band in a gig. After discovering that other bands existed with that name, the band added "Kentucky" to its name and thus became The Kentucky Headhunters. The Kentucky Headhunters began performing together the following year, playing twice monthly on the 90-minute Chitlin' Show, a radio program on WLOC in Munfordville, Kentucky.

The Kentucky Headhunters borrowed $4,500 to record a demo album, which included seven original songs, plus covers of Bill Monroe's "Walk Softly on This Heart of Mine," Henson Cargill's "Skip a Rope", and Don Gibson's "Oh Lonesome Me." Originally intended to be sold at the band's live shows, the demo tape came to the attention of the Nashville music community. Although Martin said that the band had not seriously considered signing a record deal, the band pursued one through the suggestion of its manager, Mitchell Fox. Harold Shedd, a record producer who was then the head of Mercury Records, helped sign The Kentucky Headhunters to the label in 1989.

Mercury released the demo in 1989 as The Kentucky Headhunters's debut album, Pickin' on Nashville. The album produced four singles, all of which reached top 40 on the Billboard Hot Country Singles & Tracks (now Hot Country Songs) chart. The first of these, the "Walk Softly on This Heart of Mine" cover, peaked at number 25 in December 1989. After it came "Dumas Walker." According to Doug, Mercury Records was initially reluctant to release the song as a single: "[The label] thought it was too regional, and that no one outside the area would get it, but what they didn't see, was the reaction we got to it every night that we played it in front of a crowd, and it didn't matter where we were playing either." The single peaked at number 15 on the Billboard chart.

Following "Dumas Walker" was the "Oh Lonesome Me" cover, which accounted for the band's highest Hot Country Songs chart peak at number eight. Finishing off the single releases was the number 23 "Rock 'n' Roll Angel", which Richard wrote. Pickin' on Nashville also earned the band a Grammy Award for Best Country Performance by a Duo or Group with Vocal, Best New Vocal Group award from the Academy of Country Music (ACM), and Album of the Year and Vocal Group of the Year awards from the Country Music Association (CMA). In addition, it earned a double-platinum certification from the Recording Industry Association of America (RIAA) for shipping two million copies in the United States. William Ruhlmann of Allmusic gave the album a four-and-a-half star rating out of five, saying that the band was "all the better" for having a sound closer to rock than country. After the success of their debut album, The Kentucky Headhunters began touring with Hank Williams, Jr. and Delbert McClinton.

=== 1991–1992: Second album and departure of the Phelps brothers ===
In 1991, the band released their second album, Electric Barnyard. Although the album earned a gold certification from the RIAA and a second CMA award for Vocal Group of the Year, its singles received little airplay compared to the band's previous releases, with none of the four singles reaching the top 40 on the U.S. country charts. The album's first single was a cover of "The Ballad of Davy Crockett," which was released on the 155th anniversary of Davy Crockett's death; the single shipped to radio with promotional coonskin caps. It spent eleven weeks on the charts and peaked at 49. "With Body and Soul" was the next single released, peaking at number 30 on the Canadian RPM country charts but reaching number 56 in the United States. The third and fourth singles were the original composition "It's Chitlin' Time" and a rendition of Waylon Jennings's "Only Daddy That'll Walk the Line," at numbers 63 and 60 respectively. Norman Greenbaum's 1969 single "Spirit in the Sky" was covered on this album as well.

This album was met with mixed reception from critics. Alanna Nash of Entertainment Weekly gave it an A rating, saying that it "skillfully blends raw wit, the working-class energy of sweat-stained factory workers jamming between shifts, and musical styles as diverse as the corny Tennessee Ernie Ford and the creamy Eric Clapton." Allmusic critic Brian Mansfield, who gave it three-and-a-half stars, called the band a "top-notch Southern rock band with a sense of humor," and said that the covers on Electric Barnyard were highlights, while the originals were "adequate, offbeat filler." Randy Lewis of the Los Angeles Times called the band "ZZ Top lite" and said that most of the songs on the album had a "party-hearty sound."

Later in 1991, The Kentucky Headhunters performed with Roy Rogers on the song "That's How the West Was Swung" from his Tribute album, and covered Canned Heat's "Let's Work Together" for the soundtrack to the film Harley Davidson and the Marlboro Man. In addition, Martin played lead guitar for Canadian synthpop band Men Without Hats on its 1991 album Sideways and filled in for Southern rock band Lynyrd Skynyrd guitarist Ed King on that band's 1992 tour, as King was injured at the time.

Ricky Lee and Doug departed in June 1992 due to creative differences. According to Richard, Ricky Lee's tenure as lead vocalist was "a bad time" for the band given his opposition to Richard's opinions, although Richard was still surprised to hear of the brothers' departure, and said, "I tried everything I could to get them to stay." Ricky Lee, meanwhile, said that he "was a country singer more than anything" and wanted to eliminate most of the band's hard rock sounds. He and Doug then founded Brother Phelps, which had a more mainstream country sound than The Kentucky Headhunters did. Brother Phelps released two albums for Asylum Records and charted in the country top 40 with "Let Go" and "Were You Really Livin' ," which peaked at number 6 and 28 respectively.

=== 1992–1994: New line-up and lack of success ===
Kenney rejoined in 1992 as bass guitarist, and Charlotte, Michigan, native Mark S. Orr took over on lead vocals. The first album to feature Orr and Kenney, the more blues rock-oriented Rave On!!, was released in 1993. Although the band drew attention by touring with then-labelmate Billy Ray Cyrus, Rave On!! sold poorly and failed to produce a successful single among its three releases: "Honky Tonk Walkin' ," "Blue Moon of Kentucky" and "Dixie Fried," the latter two being covers of Bill Monroe and Carl Perkins, respectively. The album also included a cover of The Lovin' Spoonful's "My Gal". "Honky Tonk Walkin'" and "Dixie Fried" respectively reached numbers 54 and 71 on the country charts, while the "Blue Moon of Kentucky" cover did not chart.

Mansfield gave a two-star rating for Allmusic, where he wrote that the band had "devolved into a redneck boogie group." Nash's review for Entertainment Weekly gave it a C− grade, and called it "warmed-over blues" that lacked the "outrageousness, wit, and brilliance that distinguished their earlier albums." Steve Morse of The Boston Globe called it an "irresistible car-stereo album," and Rolling Stone critic John Swenson said that the album was more rock-oriented than its predecessors, also saying that it "sounds like a hell of a blueprint for a summer concert tour."

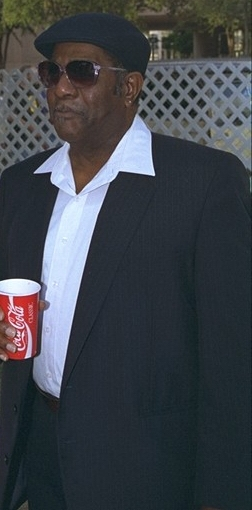
The Kentucky Headhunters' 1993 album That'll Work was a collaboration with Johnnie Johnson, pictured here in 1996.

The Orr-led lineup also recorded That'll Work, a collaborative album with Chuck Berry's pianist, Johnnie Johnson. It was released later in 1993 via Nonesuch Records, and it comprised twelve songs which Johnson and the band wrote over the course of four days. The album featured Johnson on piano, as well as lead vocals on the title track and one other song; Jimmy Hall of Wet Willie also played harmonica and saxophone, and sang backing vocals. Thom Owens of Allmusic wrote of this album that "They certainly can work a heavy, bluesy groove with dexterity, but they lack the gonzo charm they had on their debut, Pickin' on Nashville — there simply isn't the sense of careening fun, nor is there the reckless fusions that resulted in such an invigorating listen." One year later, Mercury released a greatest hits package, The Best of The Kentucky Headhunters: Still Pickin'. It reprised singles and other songs from the band's first three albums, as well as "Let's Work Together" and a cover of The Beatles' "You've Got to Hide Your Love Away," which The Kentucky Headhunters had previously recorded on the 1994 tribute album Shared Vision: The Songs of the Beatles. After Still Pickin', The Kentucky Headhunters left Mercury.

=== 1995–2002: Reunion with Doug Phelps ===
Orr left The Kentucky Headhunters in August 1995 because he "was wantin' to do somethin' else," according to Richard. Richard then called Doug and invited him to rejoin the band. As a result, Brother Phelps disbanded and Ricky Lee pursued a solo career. In 1997, The Kentucky Headhunters signed to BNA Records to release its fourth non-collaborative studio album, Stompin' Grounds, with Doug on lead vocals. This album was also an unsuccessful venture, failing to enter the country albums charts and producing only a number 70-peaking cover of Marty Robbins' "Singing the Blues". In order to promote the album, Richard suggested that the label send free copies to smaller-market radio stations, where the band's fanbase was still strong. He also considered the album's original songs as the strongest that the band had ever written. Brian Wahlert of Country Standard Time magazine wrote that it "may be the band's best album ever;" Thom Owens gave the album two-and-a-half stars in his Allmusic review, where he wrote that the band "show[ed] a lack of imagination" and "sound[ed] considerably less energetic and exciting" than on the first two albums.

Songs from the Grass String Ranch, the band's next album, was completed almost 18 months before its release. The band had consulted with 38 different independent labels before signing to Audium Entertainment, a branch of Koch Records (now MNRK Music Group), which released the album in 2000. Three months before its release, Richard suffered a heart attack, from which he soon recovered. Because the "Singing the Blues" cover had been unsuccessful, the group decided to record entirely original songs for Songs from the Grass String Ranch. All five members co-wrote all of the songs, with assistance from Verlon Dale Grissom on four of them. In addition, this album featured the Youngs on lead vocals for the first time: Fred on "Dry-Land Fish" and Richard on "Louisianna CoCo." The title track was inspired by a nickname given to the Youngs' family farm. "Too Much to Lose" was the album's first single, peaking at number 66 on Billboard country chart. Richard considered this song an unusual single release because it was the band's first ballad. Neither of the next two singles, "Louisianna CoCo" and "Love That Woman," appeared on the music charts. Giving it three stars out of five, Al Campbell of Allmusic said that it was "crowd-pleasing" but "nothing out of the ordinary." An uncredited review in The Ledger, which gave the album two-and-a-half stars out of four, said that the up-tempo songs were "nothing very original[…]but lots of fun" but added that its ballads were "mushy and earnest."

=== 2003–2006: Soul and Big Boss Man ===
Soul followed in 2003, also on Audium. This album also featured Johnnie Johnson, as well as guest appearances by organist Reese Wynans (of Double Trouble), saxophone player Jim Horn, and a local musician named Robbie Bartlett, who sang guest vocals on "Everyday People." It included the non-charting single "Lonely Nights" and a tribute song to Carl Perkins entitled "Last Night I Met Carl Perkins", as well as two covers: "I Still Wanna Be Your Man," originally recorded by Eddie Hinton, and "Have You Ever Loved a Woman?," a blues standard made famous by Eric Clapton. This album received generally favorable reviews. Mark Deming gave a three-star rating for Allmusic, saying that the album's more rhythm and blues and soul-influenced sound worked well due to the blues influences present in Southern rock, although he added that the album retained the "big guitar bombast" of the band's previous works. Matt Bjorke of About.com considered its sound a departure from the earlier albums, but added "it's not hard to see that the band fully enjoys what they are doing" and highlighted the presence of a horn section and Hammond B-3 organ on some tracks. Ray Waddell of Billboard magazine considered Wynans' and Johnson's contributions "perfect fits", and noted that the album was "laid back" until the second half. His review also mentions the extended drum solo and "stone blues coda" of the closing track "What You See Is What You Get."

In 2005, following the closure of Audium, the band signed to the CBuJ Entertainment label. Its first release for the label was Big Boss Man, an album composed entirely of cover songs. This album was led off by its title track, a cover of the Jimmy Reed blues standard. Also released from it were renditions of Roger Miller's "Chug-a-Lug" and Hank Williams' "Take These Chains from My Heart". The project was financed by Sony/ATV Music Publishing as a means of making extra money from older songs in the publishing company's catalog. Richard helped select the songs for this album, which included three other Hank Williams covers, as well as Bob Dylan's "Like a Rolling Stone," The Beatles' "I'm Down," and Patsy Cline's "Walkin' After Midnight," among others. Despite saying that the album was "obviously aimed at longtime fans," Greg Prato of Allmusic gave it three-and-a-half stars, with his review making note of the "beefed-up" Patsy Cline and Hank Williams covers. Ray Waddell of Billboard called the album "loose and rowdy," saying that the band "injected soul" into the Dylan cover and recorded an "intoxicating" version of "Chug-a-Lug," although he said that the "Hey Good Lookin'" cover was "heavy-handed." Robert Woolridge gave a mostly-favorable review for Country Standard Time, citing "Chug-a-Lug" and "So Sad to See Good Love Go Bad" (originally by The Everly Brothers) as the most country-sounding. He also described three of the Hank Williams covers positively, but said that Phelps did not have a suitable vocal range for "I'm Down" and that his voice was monotonous on "Walkin' After Midnight."

=== 2007–2021: Flying Under the Radar, Dixie Lullabies, Meet Me in Bluesland, and On Safari ===
One year later, CBuJ Entertainment released the compilation Flying Under the Radar, which comprised selections from Songs from the Grass String Ranch, Soul and Big Boss Man, as well as two new songs and a remix of "Chug-a-Lug." Kenney left the band around 2008 to take a job as the technical director of a theatre in Glasgow, Kentucky, and Doug has since taken over on bass guitar. To celebrate the 20th anniversary of the release of Pickin' on Nashville, the band released a live album entitled Authorized Bootleg: Live – Agara Ballroom – Cleveland, Ohio. It was followed in October 2011 by Dixie Lullabies on the Red Dirt label, which the band recorded at the Practice House after touring with Jamey Johnson. William Ruhlmann gave this album a positive review, comparing the sound to The Rolling Stones and ZZ Top.

In April 2015, the band released another collaborative album with Johnson entitled Meet Me in Bluesland, via Alligator Records. It was originally recorded in 2003 during the sessions for Soul. On Safari came in 2016. This album features several songs that the band had written years prior, including "Crazy Jim". Shortly before the album's release, Richard and Fred's father, James Howard, died at age 93. Also included are "Governor's Cup", the band's first ever instrumental track, and a cover of Alice Cooper's "Caught in a Dream".

=== 2021-present: That's a Fact Jack! ===
On September 25, 2021, the band announced through their official Facebook page that a new album titled That's a Fact Jack! would be released on October 22 through Practice House Records. The first single from the album was "How Could I", followed by "Susannah" and the title track. Also included on the album is a re-recording of "Shotgun Effie". Following this album's release, the band made their debut on the Grand Ole Opry on December 2, 2021. They also supported the album with a tour which began in Corinth, Mississippi that same month. According to Richard, the band was previously offered a chance to play the Grand Ole Opry in 1990 through the recommendation of bluegrass singer Bill Monroe, but Roy Acuff rejected the band due to their long hair.

In November 2025, the band independently re-released Big Boss Man through their Practice House label, to honor the album's 20th anniversary. The title track was also released to radio as a single.

== Work with other artists ==
The band's members have also participated in several projects involving other artists. Richard Young co-produced some tracks on Flynnville Train's self-titled debut album, which was released on September 11, 2007, by Show Dog Nashville, a label owned by Toby Keith (now part of Show Dog-Universal Music). This album includes the song "Truck Stop in the Sky," which Richard and Fred co-wrote with two of Flynnville Train's members, brothers Brent Flynn and David Flynn. Also in 2007, Greg Martin released a gospel rock album called The Mighty Jeremiahs as a side project. The album features Jimmy Hall and Jeff Beck, plus appearances by members of The Kentucky Headhunters, Phil Keaggy, Darrell Mansfield (for whom Martin has previously played), and others. Martin also played for Hall on his 2007 album Build Your Own Fire, a tribute album to Eddie Hinton. In 2009, Martin began a side project called Rufus Huff with Chris Hardesty, Dean Smith, and Jarrod England. This side project released an album via Zoho Music in April 2009.

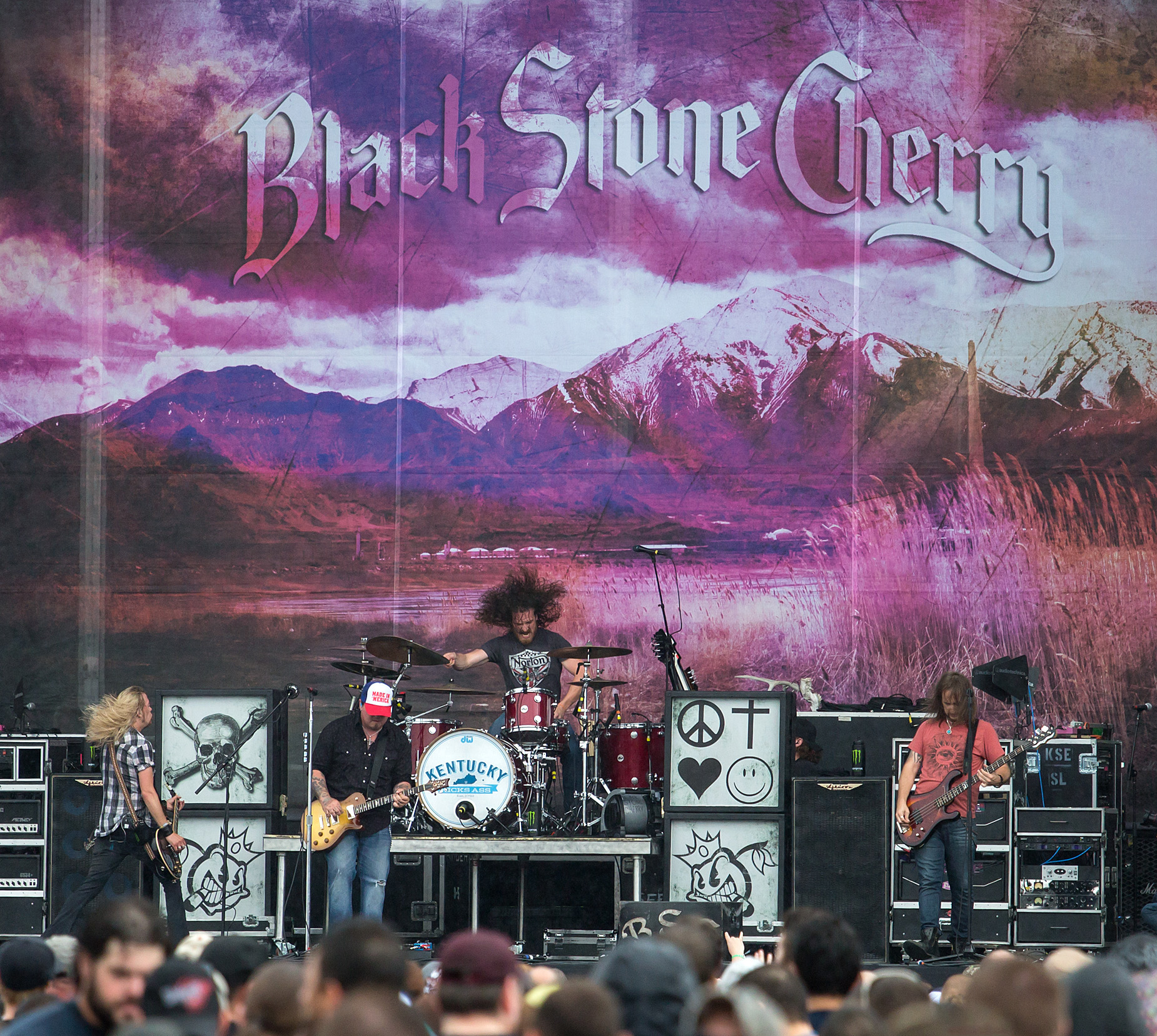
Richard Young's son, John Fred Young, is the drummer for Black Stone Cherry (pictured in 2014).

Richard, along with Stan Webb and former MCA Nashville Records artist Marty Brown, wrote Tracy Byrd's 1998 single "I'm from the Country." Brown and the band also recorded the song's demo version. Richard's son, John Fred Young, plays drums in the rock band Black Stone Cherry. The band practices at the same farm house where The Kentucky Headhunters once rehearsed.

== Musical styles ==
The band's sound is influenced by country music, rockabilly, blues, Southern rock, and heavy metal, and has been described as "guitar-heavy, rambunctious music." Lead singer Doug Phelps' voice has been described as "alternately suggest[ing] Count Basie's storied blues shouter Jimmy Rushing and the laid-back cool of Eagle Glenn Frey." The band's combination of styles is most notable in its cover song choices on early albums. All three Mercury albums contain a Bill Monroe cover, and other covers on these albums include Waylon Jennings, Carl Perkins, Norman Greenbaum and The Lovin' Spoonful. Soul showcased the band's blues and R&B influences through its use of Hammond organ and a horn section. The band's original compositions, such as "Dumas Walker" and the title track to Songs from the Grass String Ranch, often develop a regional theme. Another facet of the band's sound is Greg Martin's lead guitar work. Since 1993, he has used a Gibson Les Paul formerly owned by Hank Williams Jr. In addition to playing it on every Kentucky Headhunters album since then, he has also played it on side projects in which he has been involved.

At their peak in the early 1990s, The Kentucky Headhunters were considered a dark horse in country music, due to the significant mainstream attention that the band received despite their rougher sound and the members's rural Southern image. In 1991, Entertainment Weekly critic Alanna Nash wrote that although the band did not sell as many albums as contemporaries George Strait or Garth Brooks, "they may just end up redefining country for the '90s" given the diverse range of influences and styles. Billboard critic Ray Waddell called the band "arguably the most consistent and durable Southern rock outfit on the planet."

== Band members ==
- Greg Martin (born March 31, 1954) – lead guitar, vocals (1986–present)
- Doug Phelps (born December 15, 1960) – bass guitar, background vocals (1986–1992); lead vocals, rhythm guitar (1995–2008); lead vocals, bass guitar (2008–present)
- Fred Young (born July 8, 1958) – drums, vocals (1986–present)
- Richard Young (born January 27, 1955) – rhythm guitar, vocals (1986–present)

Former members

- Anthony Kenney (born July 14, 1956) – bass guitar, harmonica, background vocals (1992–2008)
- Mark S. Orr (born April 22, 1957) – lead vocals (1992–1995)
- Ricky Lee Phelps (born January 17, 1953) – lead vocals (1986–1992)

== Discography ==
Studio albums

- Pickin' on Nashville (1989)
- Electric Barnyard (1991)
- Rave On!! (1993)
- That'll Work (with Johnnie Johnson) (1993)
- Stompin' Grounds (1997)
- Songs from the Grass String Ranch (2000)
- Soul (2003)
- Big Boss Man (2005)
- Dixie Lullabies (2011)
- Meet Me in Bluesland (with Johnnie Johnson) (2015)
- On Safari (2016)
- That's a Fact Jack! (2021)

== Awards and nominations ==
=== Grammy Awards ===
Year	Nominee / work	Award	Result
1991	Pickin' on Nashville	Best Country Performance by a Duo or Group with Vocal	Won
1992	Electric Barnyard	Best Country Performance by a Duo or Group with Vocal	Nominated
1993	"Only Daddy That'll Walk the Line"	Best Country Performance by a Duo or Group with Vocal	Nominated

=== American Music Awards ===
Year	Nominee / work	Award	Result
1991	The Kentucky Headhunters	Favorite Country New Artist	Won
1992	The Kentucky Headhunters	Favorite Country Band/Duo/Group	Nominated

=== TNN/Music City News Country Awards ===
Year	Nominee / work	Award	Result
1991	The Kentucky Headhunters	Vocal Group of the Year	Nominated

=== Academy of Country Music Awards ===
Year	Nominee / work	Award	Result
1990	The Kentucky Headhunters	Top New Vocal Group or Duet	Won
1991	The Kentucky Headhunters	Top Vocal Group of the Year	Nominated
1992	The Kentucky Headhunters	Top Vocal Group of the Year	Nominated

=== Country Music Association Awards ===
Year	Nominee / work	Award	Result
1990	The Kentucky Headhunters	Horizon Award	Nominated
1990	"Dumas Walker"	Video of the Year	Nominated
1990	Pickin' on Nashville	Album of the Year	Won
1990	The Kentucky Headhunters	Vocal Group of the Year	Won
1991	The Kentucky Headhunters	Vocal Group of the Year	Won
