= Flynnville Train =

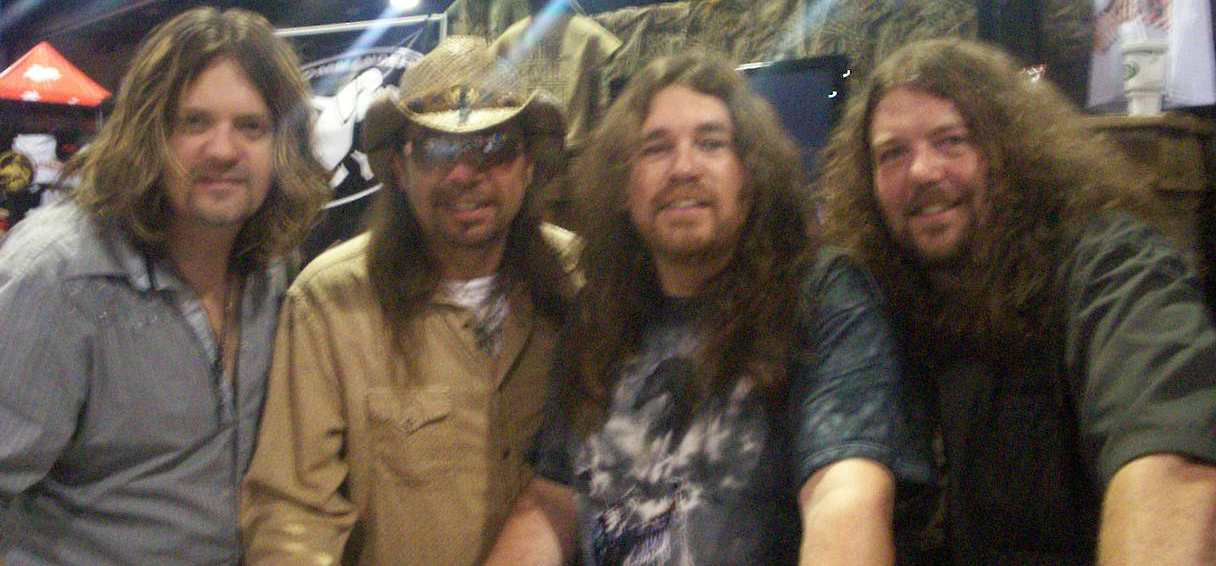
- Flynnville Train at CMA Music Fest. L-R: Damon Michael, Brian Flynn, Brent Flynn, Tommy Bales.

Background information
- Origin: Middletown, Indiana, United States
- Genres: Country
- Years active: 2001–present
- Labels: Show Dog Nashville; Next Evolution; AGR Television Records; AMP Entertainment
- Members: Tommy Bales; Brian Flynn; Brent Flynn; Joseph Shreve
- Past members: Damon Michael; Tim Beeler; Jeremy Patterson; Wes Robinson
- Website: FlynnvilleTrain.com

Flynnville Train is an American country rock band. Their self-titled debut album was released on September 11, 2007, and it produced two singles on the U.S. Billboard Hot Country Songs charts. The band is composed of Brian Flynn (lead vocals), Brent Flynn (lead guitar), Joseph Shreve (bass guitar), and Tommy Bales (drums).

== History ==
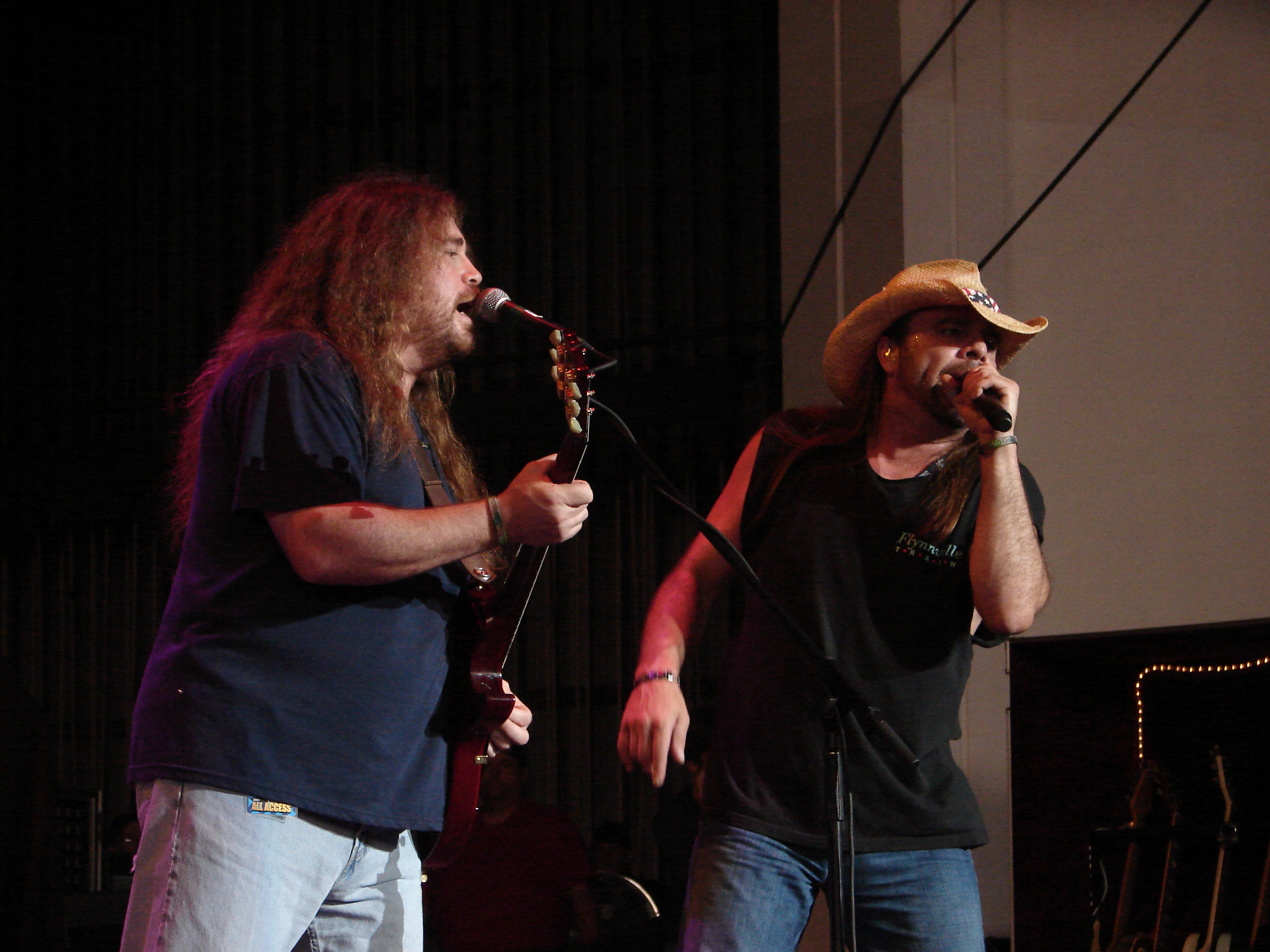
Brent and Brian Flynn at the PNC Bank Arts Center on July 15, 2007

The band was officially signed to Show Dog Nashville on June 21, 2006, after five years of playing local venues independently. Said Toby Keith regarding his signing of the band: "As soon as I got the CD I put it on and was hooked. Right then I knew I had to see if Flynnville Train were as good performing live as they are on the disc. They were more than I could have expected and I signed them on the spot. You will hear great things from this band." Their self-titled debut album was released on September 11, 2007. It produced two charting singles with "Last Good Time" and "Nowhere Than Somewhere", which reached No. 47 and No. 50 on the Billboard Hot Country Songs charts, respectively. A third single, "Tequila Sheila", failed to chart. A fourth single was released in 2009, intended to be the lead-off single to a new album, however, the single never charted and no album was released.

In April 2009, Flynnville Train and Show Dog Nashville parted ways.

Flynnville Train's second album, Redemption, was released in July 2010 with the independent label Next Evolution Records. In July 2011, along with Tanya Tucker, Rhonda Vincent & Aaron Watson the band headlined the biggest country music festival in Continental Europe: The country Rendez-Vous Festival in France. In July 2012, Flynnville Train released the single "The One You Love." The song was penned by Richard and Fred Young and Doug Phelps of The Kentucky Headhunters. Brent Flynn, Flynnville's lead guitarist relates: “Richard pitched it to us, and as soon as we heard it we knew we had to record it. We've performed it live everywhere and the feedback from the fans has been amazing.”

The band signed with its current US label, AMP Entertainment in December 2012.

In August 2013, the band licensed its new album with the German label AGR Television Records, through its current US Label, AMP Entertainment. The single "Tip a Can", written by the three current band members Brian Flynn, Brent Flynn and Thomas Bales along with former band member Damon Michael, was released and a music video for the single was released. The 2012 song "The One You Love" will also be included on the album Back on Track, which was released in September 2013.

== Discography ==
=== Studio albums ===
Title	Album details	Peak chart positions	
Title	Album details	US Country	US Heat
Flynnville Train	Release date: September 11, 2007; Label: Show Dog Nashville	49	22
Redemption	Release date: July 20, 2010; Label: Next Evolution	—	—
Back on Track	Release date: September 16, 2013; Label: AMP Entertainment / AGR Television Records	—	—
FVT IV	Release date: 2017; Label: AMP Entertainment / AGR Television Records	—	—
"—" denotes releases that did not chart

=== Singles ===
Year	Single	Peak positions	Album
Year	Single	US Country	Album
2007	"Last Good Time"	47	Flynnville Train
2007	"Nowhere Than Somewhere"	50	Flynnville Train
2007	"Tequila Sheila"	—	Flynnville Train
2009	"Turn Left"	—	Redemption
2010	"Preachin' to the Choir"	—	Redemption
2012	"The One You Love"	—	Redemption
2013	"Tip a Can"	—	Back on Track
"—" denotes releases that did not chart

=== Music videos ===
Year	Video	Director
2007	"Last Good Time"	Stephen Shephard
2007	"Nowhere Than Somewhere"	Stan Morse
2013	"Tip a Can"	
