= Flying Under the Radar =

Compilation album by The Kentucky Headhunters
- Released: June 13, 2006
- Genre: Country rock, Southern rock
- Label: CBuJ Ent.
- Producer: The Kentucky Headhunters, Tom Long

The Kentucky Headhunters chronology
Big Boss Man (2005)	Flying Under the Radar (2006)	Dixie Lullabies (2011)

Professional ratings
Review scores
Source	Rating
Allmusic	link
Country Weekly	link

Flying Under the Radar is the second compilation album by the American country rock/southern rock band The Kentucky Headhunters. It was released in 2006 via the CBuJ Ent. label. The album includes seven tracks from their 2000 album Songs from the Grass String Ranch, and two each from 2003's Soul and 2005's Big Boss Man. Also included are four new tracks: the newly written "Go to Heaven" and "Ashes of Love", as well as a cover of Stoney Cooper and Wilma Lee Cooper's "Big Midnight Special" and a re-recording of the Roger Miller song "Chug-a-Lug", which the band previously covered on Big Boss Man.

== Track listing ==
All tracks are written by The Kentucky Headhunters except as noted.

No.	Title	Writer(s)	Source album	Length
1.	"Louisianna CoCo"		Songs from the Grass String Ranch	3:59
2.	"Country Life"		Songs from the Grass String Ranch	3:36
3.	"Back to the Sun"		Songs from the Grass String Ranch	5:00
4.	"Big Boss Man"	Luther Dixon, Al Smith	Big Boss Man	3:49
5.	"Take These Chains from My Heart"	Fred Rose, Ed Heath	Big Boss Man	3:05
6.	"Go to Heaven"		new for this release	3:29
7.	"Too Much to Lose"	The Kentucky Headhunters, Verlon Dale Grissom	Songs from the Grass String Ranch	4:40
8.	"Chug-a-Lug (Dance Version)"	Roger Miller	new mix for this release, see Big Boss Man	4:00
9.	"Big Midnight Special"	Stoney Cooper, Wilma Lee Cooper	new for this release	3:09
10.	"Lonely Nights"	The Kentucky Headhunters, Wade Bernard	Soul	4:00
11.	"Everyday People"		Soul	3:57
12.	"Love That Woman"		Songs from the Grass String Ranch	3:48
13.	"Once in a While"		Songs from the Grass String Ranch	4:24
14.	"Ashes of Love"	Jack Anglin, Jim Anglin, Johnnie Wright	new for this release	3:45
15.	"Rock On"	The Kentucky Headhunters, Grissom	Songs from the Grass String Ranch	5:05

== Personnel ==
The Kentucky Headhunters

- Anthony Kenney – bass guitar, harmonica, background vocals
- Greg Martin – electric guitar, acoustic guitar, 12-string guitar, background vocals
- Doug Phelps – acoustic guitar, 12-string guitar, electric guitar, lead vocals
- Fred Young – drums, percussion, background vocals
- Richard Young – acoustic guitar, electric guitar, lead and background vocals

Guest musicians

- Robbie Bartlett – second lead vocals on "Everyday People"
- Chris Dunn – trombone
- Jim Horn – alto saxophone, tenor saxophone, baritone saxophone, horn arrangements
- Steve Patrick – trumpet
- Reese Wynans – piano, Hammond B-3 organ
