= Flynnville Train (album) =

Studio album by Flynnville Train
- Released: September 11, 2007
- Genre: Country
- Length: 35:53
- Label: Show Dog Nashville
- Producer: Flynnville Train; David Barrick; Richard Young

Flynnville Train chronology
Flynnville Train (2007)	Redemption (2010)

Professional ratings
Review scores
Source	Rating
Allmusic	link

Flynnville Train is the debut album of American country music band Flynnville Train. The album was released by Show Dog Nashville on September 11, 2007 and it includes two chart singles: "Last Good Time" and "Nowhere Than Somewhere", which peaked at #47 and #50, respectively, on the Hot Country Songs charts. The album was co-produced by Richard Young, rhythm guitarist of the country rock band The Kentucky Headhunters. Richard Young also co-wrote the track "Truck Stop in the Sky" with his brother Fred Young, who is the drummer for The Kentucky Headhunters.

== Track listing ==
1. "Last Good Time" (Neal Coty, Craig Wiseman) - 3:19
2. "Nowhere Than Somewhere" (Brent Rodgers, Wiseman) - 3:40
3. "Truck Stop in the Sky" (Brent Flynn, David Flynn, Vernon Dale Grissom, Wesley Robinson, Richard Young, Fred Young) - 3:05
4. "Tequila Sheila" (Scotty Emerick, Wiseman) - 4:01
5. "Baby's in Black" (John Lennon, Paul McCartney) - 2:09
6. "Tell Mama" (Paul Raymond, Kim Simonds) - 3:17
7. "Redneck Side of Me" (Jerrod Niemann) - 4:12
8. "High on the Mountain" (Tommy Bales, B. Flynn, D. Flynn, Jeremy Patterson, Wesley Robinson, R. Young) - 3:49
9. "Red Nekkid" (Tom Douglas, Wiseman) - 4:56
10. "Honky Tonk Jail" (James Clark) - 3:25

== Chart performance ==
Chart (2007)	Peak position
U.S. Billboard Top Country Albums	49
U.S. Billboard Top Heatseekers	22
