= Skip a Rope =

Single by Henson Cargill

from the album Skip a Rope
- B-side: "A Very Well Traveled Man"
- Released: November 1967
- Genre: Country
- Length: 2:38
- Label: Monument
- Songwriters: Jack Moran; Glenn Douglas Tubb
- Producer: Don Law

Henson Cargill singles chronology
"Skip a Rope" (1967)	"Row Row Row" (1968)

"Skip a Rope" is a song written by Jack Moran and Glenn Douglas Tubb, and recorded by American country music artist Henson Cargill, released in November 1967 as the first single and title track from the album Skip a Rope. The song was Cargill's debut release on the country chart and his most successful single. "Skip a Rope" was Cargill's sole number one on the country chart, spending five weeks at the top and a total of 16 weeks on the chart. "Skip a Rope" crossed over to the top 40, peaking at number 25.

== Content ==
The song asked listeners to pay attention to what children would say as they played. It touched on, among other things, verbal spousal abuse, tax evasion, and racism, and at the end, laid blame for what the children said directly at the feet of their parents. Cargill's original recording featured background vocals by The Jordanaires.

== Cover versions ==
The song was covered by Joe Tex on his 1968 album Soul Country, by The Kentucky Headhunters on their 1989 debut album Pickin' on Nashville, by George Jones on his penultimate album Hits I Missed... And One I Didn't, and by Charley Crockett on his 2021 album, Music City USA.

== Chart performance ==
Chart (1967–1968)	Peak position
U.S. Billboard Hot Country Singles	1
U.S. Billboard Hot 100	25
Canadian RPM Country Tracks	1
