= On Safari (album) =

Studio album by The Kentucky Headhunters
- Released: November 4, 2016
- Genre: Country rock; Southern rock
- Label: Practice House/Plowboy
- Producer: The Kentucky Headhunters

The Kentucky Headhunters chronology
Meet Me in Bluesland (2015)	On Safari (2016)	That's a Fact Jack! (2021)

On Safari is a 2016 album by American southern rock band The Kentucky Headhunters. It was released on November 4, 2016, via Plowboy Records. The album includes mostly original compositions, along with covers of Alice Cooper's "Caught in a Dream" and Charlie Daniels's "Way Down Yonder".

== Critical reception ==
Blues Blast magazine wrote that it was "a darn good album of blues influenced Southern rock". A positive review also came from Pure Grain Audio, which also praised the musicianship, Southern rock influences, and "winning formula".

== Track listing ==
All tracks composed by The Kentucky Headhunters (Greg Martin, Doug Phelps, Fred Young, Richard Young), except as noted.

1. "Beaver Creek Mansion" (Mark S. Orr) - 4:08
2. "Deep South Blues Again" - 3:13
3. "I Am the Hunter" (D. Phelps, Martin, F. Young, R. Young, Ricky Lee Phelps) - 3:54
4. "Caught in a Dream" (Michael Bruce) - 3:28
5. "Crazy Jim" - 4:14
6. "Big Time" - 3:06
7. "Lowdown Memphis Town Blues" (Anthony Mattingly, Martin, D. Phelps, F. Young, R. Young) - 3:37
8. "Rainbow Shine" (Mattingly, Martin, D. Phelps, F. Young, R. Young) - 3:13
9. "Way Down Yonder" (Charlie Daniels) - 3:18
10. "Jukebox Full of Blues" - 2:09
11. "God Loves a Rolling Stone" - 3:32
12. "Governors Cup" - 1:59
  - instrumental

== Personnel ==
Adapted from On Safari liner notes.

Musicians

- Kevin McKendree - piano, Hammond organ
- Greg Martin - lead guitar, background vocals
- Doug Phelps - lead vocals (all tracks except 2, 5, 6, 8, 12), background vocals, bass guitar
- Fred Young - drums, percussion, background vocals
- Richard Young - lead vocals (tracks 2, 5, 6, 8), background vocals, rhythm guitar

Technical

- David Barrick - engineering
- Jim DeMain - mastering
- James David Glover - cover artist
- The Kentucky Headhunters - producer
