= Stompin' Grounds =

Studio album by The Kentucky Headhunters
- Released: April 29, 1997
- Genre: Country rock, Southern rock
- Length: 36:07
- Label: BNA
- Producer: The Kentucky Headhunters

The Kentucky Headhunters chronology
The Best of The Kentucky Headhunters: Still Pickin' (1994)	Stompin' Grounds (1997)	Songs from the Grass String Ranch (2000)

Professional ratings
Review scores
Source	Rating
AllMusic	2.5/5 stars

Stompin' Grounds is the fourth studio album released by the American country rock/southern rock band The Kentucky Headhunters. It was the first album to feature Doug Phelps on lead vocals. He had rejoined the band after leaving Brother Phelps, a duo founded by him and his brother Ricky Lee, who was originally their lead vocalist. The only single from it was a cover of Guy Mitchell's "Singin' the Blues".

== Track listing ==
All tracks are written by The Kentucky Headhunters (Greg Martin, Doug Phelps, Fred Young, Richard Young, Anthony Kenney), except where noted.

No.	Title	Writer(s)	Length
1.	"Neck of the Woods"	Lonnie Williams, Sanger D. Shafer, Donny Kees, Rick Williamson	2:49
2.	"Singing the Blues"	Melvin Endsley	2:43
3.	"Party Zone"		2:31
4.	"Private Part"		2:51
5.	"Kentucky Wildcat"		3:42
6.	"Runnin' Water"		3:33
7.	"Farmer's Daughter"		3:34
8.	"See Rock City"		3:58
9.	"Southern Belle"	The Kentucky Headhunters, John Shaw III	3:02
10.	"Cowboy Best"	The Kentucky Headhunters, Verlon Dale Grissom	4:10
11.	"Mr. Know-It-All"		3:14
Total length:			36:07

== Personnel ==
The Kentucky Headhunters

- Greg Martin - electric guitar, slide guitar
- Doug Phelps - lead vocals, harmony vocals, rhythm guitar
- Fred Young - drums, percussion
- Richard Young - rhythm guitar
- Anthony Kenney – bass guitar, background vocals

Guest musicians

- Rich Ripani - piano on "Singing the Blues" and Hammond B-3 organ on "Mr. Know-It-All"
- David Barrick - shaker on "Cowboy Best"
