= Electric Barnyard =

Studio album by the Kentucky Headhunters
- Released: April 2, 1991
- Studios: The Soundshop, Nashville, TN
- Genres: Country rock, Southern rock
- Length: 41:10
- Label: Mercury
- Producer: The Kentucky Headhunters

The Kentucky Headhunters chronology
Pickin' on Nashville (1989)	Electric Barnyard (1991)	Rave On!! (1993)

Electric Barnyard is the second studio album by the American country rock band the Kentucky Headhunters, released in 1991. It was their final album to feature the original lineup of Greg Martin, Doug Phelps, Ricky Lee Phelps, Fred Young, and Richard Young. Doug and Ricky Lee would depart a year later to form the duo Brother Phelps.

The album contains four covers: "Only Daddy That'll Walk the Line" (originally by Waylon Jennings), "With Body and Soul" (originally by Bill Monroe), "Spirit in the Sky" (originally by Norman Greenbaum) and "The Ballad of Davy Crockett", a 1950s pop standard. "Only Daddy That'll Walk the Line" earned the band a Grammy Award nomination for Best Country Performance by a Duo or Group with Vocal in 1993; the album was nominated for the same award in 1992.

Professional ratings
Review scores
Source	Rating
AllMusic	3.5/5 stars
Entertainment Weekly	A

== Track listing ==
All tracks are written by the Kentucky Headhunters (Greg Martin, Doug Phelps, Ricky Lee Phelps, Fred Young, Richard Young), except where noted.

No.	Title	Writer(s)	Length
1.	"It's Chitlin' Time"		2:20
2.	"The Ballad of Davy Crockett"	George Bruns, Tom W. Blackburn	2:34
3.	"Only Daddy That'll Walk the Line"	Ivy J. "Jimmy" Bryant	3:10
4.	"With Body and Soul"	Virginia Stauffer	3:29
5.	"Diane"	The Kentucky Headhunters, Jeff Davis	3:11
6.	"16 & Single"		3:15
7.	"Wishin' Well"	Anthony Kenney, F. Young, R. Young	3:06
8.	"Spirit in the Sky"	Norman Greenbaum	4:21
9.	"Always Makin' Love"		2:39
10.	"Love Bug Crawl"	Jack R. Foshee, James Bullington	2:47
11.	"Big Mexican Dinner"		3:37
12.	"Kickin' Them Blues Around"		2:58
13.	"Take Me Back"		3:51
Total length:			41:10

== Personnel ==
- Greg Martin – electric guitar, slide guitar
- Doug Phelps – bass guitar, background vocals
- Ricky Lee Phelps – lead vocals, harmonica, percussion
- Fred Young – drums, percussion
- Richard Young – rhythm guitar

== Charts ==
=== Weekly charts ===
Chart (1991)	Peak position
Canadian Albums (RPM)	79
US Billboard 200	29
US Top Country Albums (Billboard)	3

=== Year-end charts ===
Chart (1991)	Position
US Top Country Albums (Billboard)	28
