= Big Boss Man (The Kentucky Headhunters album) =

Studio album by The Kentucky Headhunters
- Released: June 21, 2005
- Genre: Country rock, Southern rock
- Label: CBuJ Ent.
- Producer: Tom Long

The Kentucky Headhunters chronology
Soul (2003)	Big Boss Man (2005)	Flying Under the Radar (2006)

Professional ratings
Review scores
Source	Rating
Allmusic	3.5/5 stars

Big Boss Man is an album released in 2005 by the Southern American country rock band The Kentucky Headhunters. It is composed of twelve cover songs. The album's singles were "Big Boss Man", "Chug-a-Lug" and "Take These Chains from My Heart", all of which failed to chart. Four Hank Williams covers are included as well: "Honky Tonk Blues", "Take These Chains from My Heart", "Hey Good Lookin'", and "You Win Again".

The album was released in late 2025 through the band's Practice House label, in honor of the album's 20th anniversary.

== Track listing ==
No.	Title	Writer(s)	Original artist	Length
1.	"Big Boss Man"	Luther Dixon, Al Smith	Jimmy Reed (1961)	3:49
2.	"Honky Tonk Blues"	Williams	Hank Williams (1952)	3:39
3.	"Take These Chains from My Heart"	Fred Rose, Hy Heath	Hank Williams (1953)	3:08
4.	"Walkin' After Midnight"	Alan Block, Don Hecht	Patsy Cline (1957)	3:09
5.	"Hey Good Lookin'"	Williams	Hank Williams (1951)	3:06
6.	"Like a Rolling Stone"	Dylan	Bob Dylan (1965)	5:57
7.	"Chug-a-Lug"	Miller	Roger Miller (1964)	2:08
8.	"So Sad (To Watch Good Love Go Bad)"	Don Everly	The Everly Brothers (1960)	3:35
9.	"Made in Japan"	Bob Morris, Faye Morris	Buck Owens (1972)	3:47
10.	"You Win Again"	Williams	Hank Williams (1952)	4:18
11.	"Don't It Make You Wanna Go Home"	South	Joe South (1969)	3:37
12.	"I'm Down"	John Lennon, Paul McCartney	The Beatles (1965)	3:07

== Personnel ==
- Anthony Kenney – bass guitar, background vocals
- Greg Martin – lead guitar, rhythm guitar, background vocals
- Doug Phelps – lead vocals (all tracks except "Honky Tonk Blues" and "Hey Good Lookin'"), rhythm guitar, tambourine
- Reese Wynans – Hammond B-3 organ, piano
- Fred Young – drums, percussion, background vocals
- Richard Young – rhythm guitar, lead vocals on "Honky Tonk Blues" and "Hey Good Lookin'", background vocals
