= That's a Fact Jack! =

Studio album by The Kentucky Headhunters
- Released: October 2, 2021
- Genre: Country rock; Southern rock
- Length: 44:02
- Label: Practice House
- Producer: The Kentucky Headhunters

The Kentucky Headhunters chronology
| On Safari (2016) | That's a Fact Jack! (2021) |

That's a Fact Jack! is an album by the American country rock band The Kentucky Headhunters. It was released on October 2, 2021 via Practice House Records.

== Content ==
The album consists of twelve tracks. As is usual for the band, bassist Doug Phelps and rhythm guitarist Richard Young alternate most of the lead vocals. Drummer Fred Young sings "Cup of Tea" and a cover of Rick Derringer's "Cheap Tequila", while lead guitarist Greg Martin sings "Shotgun Effie". The band had previously recorded "Shotgun Effie" in 1974 when they were still known as Itchy Brother. The band recorded That's a Fact Jack! at the Practice House, the home studio at which they do most of their recording.

== Track listing ==
1. "Gonna Be Alright" (Greg Martin, Doug Phelps, Fred Young, Richard Young, T.J. Lyle) - 4:00
2. "How Could I" (R. Young, John Fred Young, Ben Wells, Chris Robertson, Jon Lawhon) - 3:07
3. "Watercolors in the Rain" (Martin, Phelps, F. Young, R. Young, W.L. Stogner) - 3:07
4. "Susannah" (Martin, Phelps, F. Young, R. Young) - 4:14
5. "Cup of Tea" (Lyle, Martin, Phelps, F. Young, R. Young) - 4:04
6. "We Belong Together" (Lyle, Martin, Phelps, Logan Tolbert, F. Young, R. Young) - 3:24
7. "That's a Fact Jack" (Martin, Phelps, F. Young, R. Young) - 3:56
8. "Lonely Too Long" (Martin, Phelps, F. Young, R. Young) - 3:11
9. "Heart and Soul" (Anthony Kenney, Martin, Phelps, F. Young, R. Young) - 2:59
10. "Cheap Tequila" (Rick Derringer) - 3:54
11. "Shotgun Effie" (Kenney, Martin, F. Young, R. Young) - 3:35
12. "Let's All Get Together and Fight" (Martin, Phelps, F. Young, R. Young) - 4:29

== Personnel ==
From That's a Fact Jack! liner notes.

The Kentucky Headhunters

- Greg Martin - lead guitar, slide guitar, acoustic guitar, background vocals; lead vocals on "Shotgun Effie"
- Doug Phelps - bass guitar, six-string bass guitar, lead vocals on "Gonna Be Alright", "How Could I", "Susannah", "We Belong Together", "Lonely Too Long", and "Heart and Soul"
- Fred Young - drums, background vocals; lead vocals on "Cup of Tea" and "Cheap Tequila"
- Richard Young - rhythm guitar, background vocals; lead vocals on "Watercolors in the Rain", "That's a Fact Jack", and "Let's All Get Together and Fight"

Additional musicians

- David Barrick - tubular bells
- T.J. Lyle - Wurlitzer electric piano
- Kevin McKendree - piano, Hammond B-3 organ
- John Fred Young - background vocals

Technical

- David Barrick - recording, mixing
- The Kentucky Headhunters - producer, mixing
- Jon Lawhon - art design
- Joe McNally - photography
- Rodney Mills - mastering
