= Johnnie Johnson (musician) =

American jazz, blues, and rock and roll pianist (1924–2005)

- Johnson at the 1996 Riverwalk Blues Festival

Background information
- Born: Johnnie Clyde Johnson; July 8, 1924; Fairmont, West Virginia, U.S.
- Died: April 13, 2005 (aged 80) St. Louis, Missouri, U.S.
- Genres: Blues; rock and roll; jazz
- Occupations: Musician; songwriter
- Instrument: Piano
- Years active: 1952–2005
- Label: Chess

Johnnie Clyde Johnson (July 8, 1924 – April 13, 2005) was an American pianist who played jazz, blues, and rock and roll. His work with Chuck Berry led to his induction into the Rock and Roll Hall of Fame. He was posthumously awarded the Congressional Gold Medal for breaking racial barriers in the military as a Montford Point Marine, where he endured racism and inspired social change while integrating the previously all-white Marine Corps during World War II.

== Career ==
Johnson was born in Fairmont, West Virginia, United States. He began playing the piano in 1928. During World War II, he joined the United States Marine Corps and became a member of Bobby Troup's all-serviceman jazz orchestra: the Barracudas. After his service, Johnson moved to Detroit and then Chicago, where he sat in with many notable artists, including Muddy Waters and Little Walter.

Johnson moved to St. Louis, Missouri in 1952; he immediately assembled a jazz and blues group called the Sir John Trio with the drummer Ebby Hardy and the saxophonist Alvin Bennett. The three had a regular engagement at the Cosmopolitan Club in East St. Louis. On New Year's Eve 1952, Bennett suffered a stroke and could not perform. While searching for a last-minute replacement, Johnson called a young man named Chuck Berry. Berry was the only musician he knew who, because of his inexperience, would likely not be playing on New Year's Eve. Although Berry was hired as a limited guitarist, he added vocals and showmanship to the group and soon became a permanent member of the trio.

Berry took one of their tunes, a reworking of Bob Wills's version of "Ida Red", to Chess Records in 1955. The Chess brothers liked the song. Soon, the trio were in Chicago recording "Maybellene" and "Wee Wee Hours" – a song Johnson played as an instrumental for years before Berry wrote some accompanying lyrics. The same year, "Maybellene" got Berry and Johnson onto the Billboard charts. Berry was soon signed as a solo act while Johnson and Hardy became part of Berry's band. "I figured we could get better jobs with Chuck running the band," said Johnson. "He had a car and rubber wheels beat rubber heels any day."

Over the next twenty years, the two collaborated on many of Berry's songs, including "School Days", "Roll Over Beethoven", "Carol", and "Nadine". The song "Johnny B. Goode" was reportedly a tribute to Johnson's behavior when he was drinking.

Berry and Johnson played and toured together on and off, until 1973. Although never on his payroll after 1973, Johnson played occasionally with Berry, until he sued Berry over songwriting credits and royalties.

Johnson was known to have a serious drinking problem. In Berry's autobiography, he wrote that he had declared there would be no drinking in the car while the band was on the road. Johnson and his bandmates complied with the request by putting their heads out the window. Johnson denied the story but said he did drink on the road. Johnson quit drinking in 1991, after nearly suffering a stroke on stage with Eric Clapton.

Aside from songwriting and performing with Berry, Johnson made many significant contributions to blues and rock and roll. Johnson was the leader of Albert King's rhythm section during King's most prolific and musically significant period. Johnson also served as one of the cornerstones of the St. Louis blues scene. In the early and mid 1980s he was a member of The Sounds of The City, with vocalist Larry Thurston, bassist Gus Thornton, and guitarist Tom Maloney. Johnson performed all over St. Louis with Tommy Bankhead, Oliver Sain, and many significant blues artists throughout their lives.

Johnson received little recognition until the Chuck Berry concert documentary, Hail! Hail! Rock 'n' Roll, was released in 1987. The experience forged a permanent bond between him, Keith Richards, Eric Clapton, and Steve Jordan. Although Johnson had been supporting himself as a bus driver in St. Louis, the exposure and experience of the film helped him return to headlining.

He recorded his first solo album, Blue Hand Johnnie, that year. Having worked steadily in St. Louis, Johnson returned to performing all over the world. He performed with the Kentucky Headhunters on occasion and was featured in both the "Dumas Walker" and "Walk Softly on This Heart of Mine" videos. Eric Clapton hired him as a featured artist for his annual Royal Albert Hall blues shows. Keith Richards employed Johnson in the Xpensive Winos, and Johnson played piano on Richards' debut solo album, Talk Is Cheap (1988). Johnson toured worldwide as a solo artist, and released records produced by Keith Richards, Jimmy Vivino, and Al Kooper. He later performed with Richards, Clapton, Buddy Guy, John Lee Hooker, Bo Diddley, and George Thorogood on Thorogood's 1995 live album, Live: Let's Work Together. In 1996 and 1997, Johnson toured with Bob Weir's band, Ratdog, playing 67 shows. In 1997, Johnson, Raymond Cantrell, and Stevie Lee Dodge composed the St. Charles Blues Trio.

In 1998, Johnson told Doug Donnelly of Monroenews.com that "Johnny B. Goode" was a tribute to Johnson himself. "I played no part in nothing of 'Johnny B. Goode,'" Johnson said. "On other songs, Chuck and I worked together, but not that one. We were playing one night, I think it was Chicago, and he played it. Afterward, he told me it was a tribute to me. He did it on his own. I didn't know nothing about it. It was never discussed."

A biography of Johnson, Father of Rock and Roll: The Story of Johnnie B. Goode Johnson, by Travis Fitzpatrick, was published in 1999. The book was entered into the annual Pulitzer Prize competition by Congressman John Conyers and garnered Johnson more recognition.

Johnson received a Pioneer Award from the Rhythm and Blues Foundation in 2000.

Johnson's final album, Johnnie Be Eighty. And Still Bad!, was recorded in St. Louis in late 2004, consisting of all original songs written with the producer, Jeff Alexander, which was a first for Johnson. The album was released the same week he died in April 2005, and contains the biographical "Beach Weather" and "Lucky Four".

In 2005, he played piano on Styx's re-recording of "Blue Collar Man", entitled "Blue Collar Man @ 2120", for their album Big Bang Theory. It was recorded at Chess Studios, on the 46th anniversary of the recording of "Johnnie B. Goode" at the same studio.

Johnson died at the age of 80 from a kidney ailment and pneumonia in St. Louis on April 13, 2005. He was interred in the Jefferson Barracks National Cemetery.

In August 2025, a posthumous collection of Johnnie's work was released, including guest appearances by musicians who worked with Johnnie. Included, is a bonus CD with two interviews with Johnnie, with legendary radio personality, Pat St. John.

== Legacy ==
In November 2000, Johnson sued Chuck Berry, alleging he deserved co-composer credits (and royalties) for dozens of songs, including "No Particular Place to Go," "Sweet Little Sixteen", and "Roll Over Beethoven," which credit Berry alone. The case was eventually dismissed, because too many years had passed since the songs in dispute were written.

In 2001, he was inducted into the Rock and Roll Hall of Fame, in the category "Sidemen," after a campaign by the businessman George Turek, Johnson's biographer Travis Fitzpatrick, and the guitarist Keith Richards of the Rolling Stones.

Johnson has a star on the St. Louis Walk of Fame.

Johnson was the subject of a Homespun Tapes piano instructional video, The Blues/Rock Piano of Johnnie Johnson: Sessions with a Keyboard Legend. Originally released in 1999 (a DVD was issued in 2005), the video is hosted by David Bennett Cohen, along with Johnson's band, featuring guitarist Jimmy Vivino.

The Johnnie Johnson Blues & Jazz Festival is held annually in Fairmont West Virginia, only a few blocks from where Johnson was born.

== Discography ==
- 1959: Organ in Hi-Fi [instrumental] (Riviera Records R0044/STR044)
- 1987: Blue Hand Johnnie (Evidence Music), with Oliver Sain
- 1991: Johnnie B. Bad (Elektra), with Eric Clapton, Keith Richards and Bernard Fowler
- 1991: Rockin' Eighty-Eights (Modern Blues Recordings), with Clayton Love and Jimmy Vaughan (not to be confused with Jimmie Vaughan of the Fabulous Thunderbirds)
- 1993: That'll Work (Elektra), with the Kentucky Headhunters and Jimmy Hall
- 1995: Johnnie Be Back (MusicMasters), with Buddy Guy, Al Kooper, John Sebastian and Max Weinberg
- 1997: Johnnie B. Live (Father of Rock and Roll Music), with Jimmy Vivino and Al Kooper
- 1999: Father of Rock and Roll (Father of Rock and Roll Music), CD accompanying the book Father of Rock and Roll: The Story of Johnnie B. Goode Johnson, featuring new recordings of Johnson and Berry songs
- 2005: Johnnie Be Eighty...And Still Bad! (Cousin Moe Music), produced by Jeff Alexander, with Rich McDonough (guitar), Gus Thornton (bass), Joe Pastor (drums), Larry Thurston (vocals) and Victor "Big Daddy" Johnson (vocals)
- 2015: Meet Me in Bluesland (Alligator), with the Kentucky Headhunters
- 2025: I'm Just Johnnie, published posthumously by Gene Ackmann on Missouri Morning Records, including guest artist contributions, and numerous top St. Louis Missouri musicians. The project includes a second CD with interviews, including Johnnie and Pat St. John in the studio. Most recording done circa 2003.

== Singles ==
- 1994: "Sunday Blues" (with The Kentucky Headhunters)

== See also ==
- Music of West Virginia
- St. Louis blues (music)
