= That'll Work =

Studio album by Johnnie Johnson and The Kentucky Headhunters
- Released: August 17, 1993
- Genre: Blues rock
- Length: 48:44
- Label: Elektra/Nonesuch
- Producer: The Kentucky Headhunters

The Kentucky Headhunters chronology
Rave On!! (1993)	That'll Work (1993)	The Best of The Kentucky Headhunters: Still Pickin' (1994)

That'll Work is the fourth studio album by American blues pianist Johnnie Johnson and American country rock band The Kentucky Headhunters. It was released in August 1993 via Nonesuch Records.

The members of The Kentucky Headhunters wrote all 12 songs on the album with Johnson over the course of twelve days.

== Critical reception ==
Thom Owens of Allmusic rated the album 2 stars out of 5, saying that "They certainly can work a heavy, bluesy groove with dexterity, but they lack the gonzo charm they had on their debut, Pickin' on Nashville — there simply isn't the sense of careening fun, nor is there the reckless fusions that resulted in such an invigorating listen."

== Track listing ==
All songs written by The Kentucky Headhunters and Johnnie Johnson.

1. "That'll Work" — 4:02
2. "Sunday Blues" — 4:45
3. "Johnnie's Breakdown" — 2:04
4. "I'm Not Runnin'" — 5:58
5. "Bummed About Love" — 2:17
6. "Stumblin'" — 3:24
7. "Back to Memphis" — 5:14
8. "The Feel" — 3:16
9. "I Know You Can" — 5:12
10. "She's Got to Have It" — 4:09
11. "Derby Day Special" — 3:06
12. "Tell Me Baby" — 5:17

== Personnel ==
Compiled from liner notes.

The Kentucky Headhunters

- Anthony Kenney — bass guitar
- Greg Martin — lead guitar, slide guitar
- Mark S. Orr — lead vocals
- Fred Young — drums, percussion
- Richard Young — rhythm guitar

Additional musicians

- Jimmy Hall — saxophone, harmonica; background vocals on "Stumblin'" and "Back to Memphis"
- Johnnie Johnson — piano; lead vocal on "That'll Work" and "I Know You Can"

Technical

- Mike Bradley — mixing, recording
- John Dickson — assistant engineer
- Mitchell Fox — executive producer
- The Kentucky Headhunters — production, arrangement
- Glen Knight — executive producer
- Howie Weinberg — mastering
