= Singing the Blues =

1956 song performed by Guy Mitchell

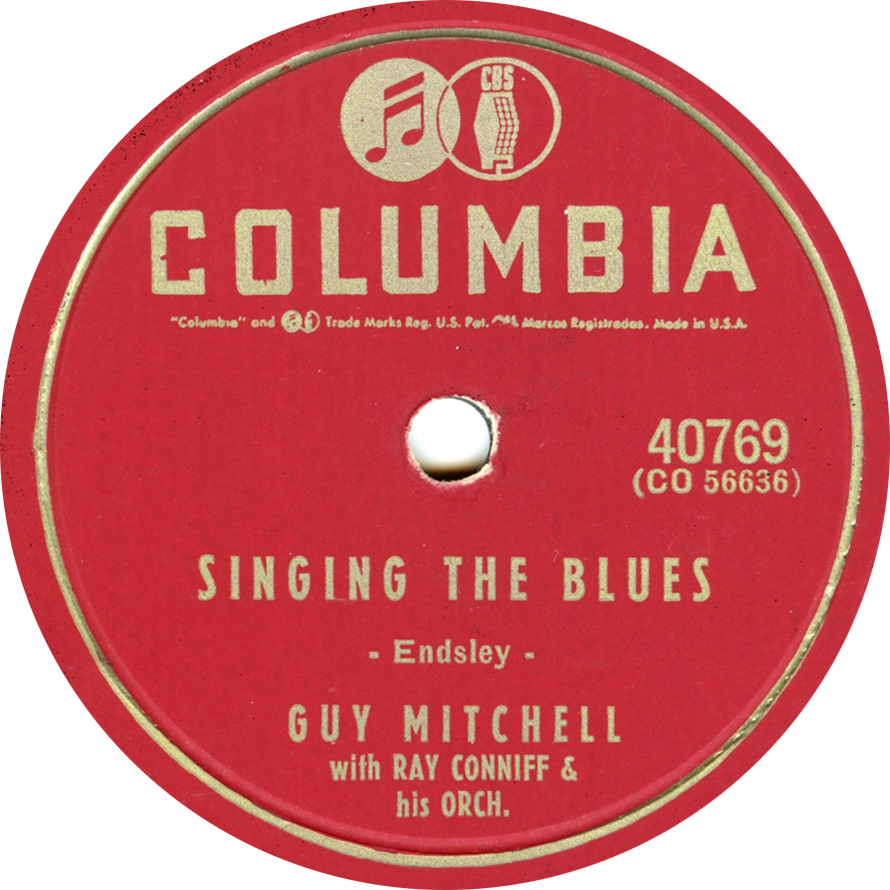

Single by Guy Mitchell
- B-side: "Crazy With Love"
- Released: October 1956
- Studio: Columbia 30th Street Studio, New York City
- Genre: Rock and roll
- Length: 2:31
- Label: Columbia
- Songwriter: Melvin Endsley
- Producer: Mitch Miller

Guy Mitchell singles chronology
"Ninety Nine Years" (1956)	"Singing the Blues" (1956)	"Crazy with Love" (1956)

"Singing the Blues" is a popular song composed by Melvin Endsley and published in 1956. The highest-charting version was by Guy Mitchell and the first recording of the song was by Marty Robbins. It is not related to the 1920 jazz song "Singin' the Blues" recorded by Frank Trumbauer and Bix Beiderbecke in 1927.

== Guy Mitchell ==
The best-known recording was released in October 1956 by Guy Mitchell and spent ten weeks at No. 1 on the U.S. Billboard chart from 8 December 1956, to 2 February 1957. It was Mitchell's second and last hit in Italy, on national Musica e Dischi Hit Parade, after "My Heart Cries For You" in 1951. An example of the U.S. recording is on Columbia #40769, dated 1956, with the Ray Conniff Orchestra. Mitchell's version was also No. 1 in the UK Singles Chart for three (non-consecutive) weeks in early 1957, one of only four singles to rise to No. 1 on the chart on three occasions, with the other three being "I Believe" by Frankie Laine, "Happy" by Pharrell Williams and "What Do You Mean?" by Justin Bieber. Mitchell's version prominently features whistling in the intro and solo sections.

== Marty Robbins and Tommy Steele versions ==
Two other charting versions of the song were released almost simultaneously with Mitchell's, one by the English singer Tommy Steele (with the Steelmen) and the other (recorded before Mitchell covered it) by US country singer Marty Robbins.

Tommy Steele's version of "Singing the Blues" made number 1 in the UK Singles Chart for one week on 11 January 1957, sandwiched by two of the weeks that Guy Mitchell's version of the same song topped the charts. Steele's recording of the song was not a chart success in the US.

The Marty Robbins version, recorded at the Bradley Studios in Nashville, Tennessee, made it to number one on the Billboard C&W Best Sellers chart for 13 weeks in late 1956 and early 1957 and peaked at number seventeen on the US pop chart. In 1983, Gail Davies recorded a cover version, taking her version into the top 20 of the Hot Country Singles chart in the spring of 1983.

== Other cover versions ==
The song is often revived, and on four occasions new recordings of "Singing the Blues" have become UK Top 40 hits. These latter-day hit versions were by Dave Edmunds (1980), Gail Davies (1983), Daniel O'Donnell (1994), and Cliff Richard & the Shadows (2009).

== Charting versions ==
Release date	Performer	Chart Positions				Notes
Release date	Performer	UK	U.S.	U.S. C&W	CAN Country	Notes
1956	Marty Robbins	—	17	1	—	—
1956	Guy Mitchell	1	1	—	—	Reached number 1 in the UK in early 1957
1956	Tommy Steele & the Steelmen	1	—	—	—	Reached number 1 in the UK in early 1957
1964	Connie Francis & Hank Williams Jr.					
1980	Dave Edmunds	28	—	—	—	—
1983	Gail Davies	—	—	17	19	—
1994	Daniel O'Donnell	23	—	—	—	—
1997	The Kentucky Headhunters	—	—	70	—	—
2009	Cliff Richard & the Shadows	40	—	—	—	—

== More cover versions ==
Trumpeter Bob Scobey and banjoist/vocalist Clancy Hayes recorded a trad jazz version in 1958 for the LP "Scobey and Clancy raid the Jukebox" on the Good Time Jazz label. Other notable cover versions include a 1960 recording by Bill Haley & His Comets, a 1963 version by Dean Martin, and a 1971 version by Black Oak Arkansas. It was recorded by Marie Osmond for her 1975 album In My Little Corner of the World, by Gene Summers on his 1981 French album Gene Summers in Nashville, by Randy Travis on his 1989 album No Holdin' Back, and by The Kentucky Headhunters for their album Stompin' Grounds (1997). A version by Bert Jansch appears on his 2000 release Crimson Moon. Frank Ifield, Max Bygraves and Slim Whitman also recorded the song.

"Singing the Blues" was performed live by Paul McCartney on the MTV show Unplugged in 1991 and included on the subsequent soundtrack, Unplugged (The Official Bootleg).

Hank Snow did it on his 1969 album on RCA "I Went To Your Wedding".

The song was also performed by Albert Lee.

The tune was also sung by Vivian Vance and William Frawley (Ethel and Fred of I Love Lucy fame) for a Ford Motor Company television commercial promoting the Edsel.

The Californian pop punk band Groovie Ghoulies covered the song on their third album World Contact Day in 1996.

The first line of this song is famously the last line of "London Calling" by the Clash, cut short and echoed in the final mix of the song ("I never felt so much a-like, a-like, a-like...").

Hugues Aufray and his Skiffle Group recorded a French version of the song, "Tout le long du chemin", in 1964.

== Use in English football ==
Birmingham City-supporting radio presenters Tom Ross and Ian Danter released a version to celebrate the club's promotion to the Premier League. It has been sung since at least the 1969 season by fans of the Midlands club. Blackburn Rovers fans have been known to sing a version of the song: "Never felt more like singing the blues, the Rovers win and Burnley lose, oh Rovers, you've got me singing the blues." Everton fans sing a version of this song; "I've never felt more like singing the blues, when Everton win and Liverpool lose, oh Everton you've got me singing the blues." Also this song is commonly used at Manchester City football matches, where the fans sing: "Never felt more like singing the blues, City win, United lose." This song has been used by Sheffield Wednesday fans since the 1960s. Their lyrics are: "Never felt more like singing the blues, When Wednesday win, United lose." Former Wednesday player Terry Curran recorded a version of the song in 1980 that sold tens of thousands, that is still used at Hillsborough to this day. Ipswich Town fans also use the song and the club recorded their own version of it, with the chorus being "I've never felt more like singing the Blues, When Ipswich win and Norwich lose, Oh Ipswich you've got me singing the blues".
