= Dixie Lullabies =

Studio album by The Kentucky Headhunters
- Released: October 18, 2011
- Genres: Country rock, Southern rock
- Length: 49:05
- Label: Red Dirt
- Producers: The Kentucky Headhunters; Wayd Battle; Richie Owens

The Kentucky Headhunters chronology
Flying Under the Radar (2006)	Dixie Lullabies (2011)	Meet Me in Bluesland (2015)

Dixie Lullabies is an album by the American southern rock/country rock band The Kentucky Headhunters. It was released on October 18, 2011, through Red Dirt Records.

== Critical reception ==
AllMusic gave the album three-and-a-half stars out of five and in its review by William Ruhlmann, he thought that the songs were "steeped in familiar structures" and "will fit right in with the band's earlier material". An identical rating came from Jonathan Keefe of Slant Magazine, who said that "What the album lacks in surprises it makes up for in pure, unadulterated swagger" and that the Headhunters "are still one of the finest Southern-rock outfits around."

== Track listing ==
All tracks written by The Kentucky Headhunters; co-writers in parentheses.

1. "Dixie Lullaby" — 2:41
2. "Boones Farm Boogie" — 3:14
3. "Great Acoustics" — 3:46
4. "Tumblin' Roses" (John Fred Young) — 3:38
5. "Les Paul Standard" — 3:18
6. "In a Perfect World" — 3:33
7. "Roll On Little Pretty" (Wayd Battle, Daryll Meadows) — 3:26
8. "Sugar Daddy" — 3:15
9. "Just Another Night" — 4:13
10. "Little Miss Blues Breaker" — 2:54
11. "Little Angel" (Anthony Kenney) — 3:41
12. "Just Believe" — 4:30
13. "Ain't That a Shame" — 2:32
14. "Recollection Blues" — 4:24

== Personnel ==
Compiled from liner notes and backing card.

The Kentucky Headhunters

- Greg Martin — lead guitar, background vocals
- Doug Phelps — bass guitar, lead vocals (tracks 1, 3, 5, 7–9, 12, 13), background vocals
- Fred Young — drums, background vocals
- Richard Young — rhythm guitar, lead vocals (tracks 1, 2, 4, 6, 10, 11, 14), background vocals

Note: Doug Phelps and Richard Young sing a unison lead vocal on "Dixie Lullaby".

Additional musicians

- The Farm Young Quartet (Fred, Marla, Rachel and Audrey Young) — background vocals
- "Cowboy" Eddie Long — steel guitar
- Kevin McKendree — piano, organ
- Richie Owens — mandolin

== Chart performance ==
Chart (2011)	Peak position
U.S. Billboard Top Country Albums	75
