= Dixie Fried =

Sun 249, 78 single, 1956

"Dixie Fried" is a 1956 song written by Carl Perkins and Howard "Curley" Griffin and released as a single on Sun Records. The song was released as a 45 and 78 single, Sun 249, in August, 1956 backed with "I'm Sorry, I'm Not Sorry". The single reached no. 10 on the Billboard country and western chart in 1956. The single was also released in Canada on the Quality label as #1557. The record was reissued as a 45 single in 1979 on the Shelby Singleton-owned Sun Golden Treasure Series as Sun 10.

Howard "Curley" Griffin was a singer and disc jockey from Jackson, Tennessee who quoted from the song in his own release, "Got Rockin' On My Mind", released in 1957 on the Atomic Records label as 305. Griffin uses the refrain "rave on" and "dixie fried". Griffin also co-wrote the song "Boppin' the Blues" with Carl Perkins in 1956.

The 1958 Sonny West song "Rave On" (popularized by Buddy Holly) was based on "Dixie Fried" and uses the refrain "rave on" from "Dixie Fried".

== Notable recordings ==
The song has also been recorded by Chris Isaak on his 2011 album Beyond the Sun, George Thorogood & The Destroyers in 1985 on the album Maverick, Jimmy Gilmer and the Fireballs in 1965, Eugene Chadbourne in 1987, Jim Dickinson in 1972 on the Atlantic album Dixie Fried, and Alan Mills featuring Darrel Higham in 1999. Keith De Groot also recorded the song in 1968 in a session that featured Jimmy Page on lead guitar, John Paul Jones on bass, Nicky Hopkins on piano, Clem Cattini on drums, and Chris Hughes on tenor saxophone. The Kentucky Headhunters covered the song on their 1993 album Rave On!! Their version peaked at number 71 on the Billboard Hot Country Singles & Tracks chart.

Carl Perkins recorded an updated version of the song in 1973 entitled "(Let's Get) Dixiefried" from the My Kind of Country album which reached no. 61 on the Billboard country chart.

"Dixie Fried"
Carl Perkins' 1956 recording of the song

== Sources ==
- Perkins, Carl, and McGee, David, (1996) Go, Cat, Go!: The Life and Times of Carl Perkins, The King of Rockabilly, Hyperion Press. ISBN 0-7868-6073-1
- Morrison, Craig (1998) Go Cat Go!: Rockabilly Music and Its Makers, University of Illinois Press.
- The Carl Perkins Sun Collection.
- Guterman, Jimmy. (1998) "Carl Perkins." In The Encyclopedia of Country Music. Paul Kingsbury, Ed. New York: Oxford University Press. pp. 412–413.
- Naylor, Jerry; Halliday, Steve. The Rockabilly Legends: They Called It Rockabilly Long Before They Called It Rock and Roll, Milwaukee, Wisc.: Hal Leonard. ISBN 978-1-4234-2042-2. OCLC 71812792.
