= Only Daddy That'll Walk the Line =

Song written by Jimmy Bryant

Single by Waylon Jennings

from the album Only the Greatest
- B-side: "Right Before My Eyes"
- Released: July 13, 1968
- Recorded: April 16, 1968
- Studio: RCA Studio B (Nashville, Tennessee)
- Genre: Country
- Length: 2:23
- Label: RCA Victor #9561
- Songwriter: Jimmy Bryant
- Producer: Chet Atkins

Waylon Jennings singles chronology
"I Got You" (1968)	"Only Daddy That'll Walk the Line" (1968)	"Yours Love" (1968)

"Only Daddy That'll Walk the Line" is a song written by Jimmy Bryant. Originally recorded by American country music singer Jim Alley, it was made famous by American country music singer and musician Waylon Jennings.

== Waylon Jennings version ==
Jennings recorded the song on April 16, 1968, at RCA Victor Studios in Nashville, with Chet Atkins producing, with Wayne Moss playing the guitar solo. It was released in July 1968 as the second single from Jennings' album Only the Greatest.

Billboard, in a review of the album, said that it and "Walk On Out of My Mind" were "typical of the robust, compelling vocal style." Nathan Brackett and Christian Hoard, in The New Rolling Stone Album Guide, wrote that Jennings began to "really assert his rough-hewn sensibility" on the song.

The song was featured in season seven episode five of Mad Men, and was played briefly in the film Talladega Nights: The Ballad of Ricky Bobby.

=== Chart positions ===
The song spent eighteen weeks on the Hot Country Singles charts, peaking at #2 and holding that peak for five weeks. In Canada, it reached Number One on the RPM Country Tracks charts for the week ending September 30, 1968.

Chart (1968)	Peak position
US Hot Country Songs (Billboard)	2
Canadian RPM Country Tracks	1

== Linda Ronstadt version ==
Linda Ronstadt included a gender-reversed version of the song (sung as "The Only Mama That'll Walk the Line") on her 1969 album Hand Sown ... Home Grown; The song became a staple of Ronstadt's set lists at her concerts during the late 1960s and early '70s. She performed it on The Johnny Cash Show in June 1969, nearly a year before Jennings performed it on the same show.

== Hank Williams Jr. version ==
Hank Williams Jr. included a version of the song on his album Family Tradition, which was released in 1979.

== The Kentucky Headhunters version ==
"Only Daddy That'll Walk the Line"

Single by The Kentucky Headhunters

from the album Electric Barnyard
- B-side: "Walk Softly on This Heart of Mine"
- Released: 1991
- Genre: Country
- Length: 3:10
- Label: Mercury #866134
- Songwriter: Jimmy Bryant
- Producer: The Kentucky Headhunters

The Kentucky Headhunters singles chronology
"It's Chitlin' Time" (1991)	"Only Daddy That'll Walk the Line" (1991)	"Let's Work Together" (1992)

In 1991, The Kentucky Headhunters recorded a cover version for the album Electric Barnyard. Also released as a single that year, this version spent seven weeks on the same chart and peaked at #60.

=== Chart positions ===
Chart (1991)	Peak position
US Hot Country Songs (Billboard)	60
