= The Ballad of Davy Crockett =

Single by Bill Hayes
- B-side: "Farewell"
- Released: February 1955
- Recorded: December 16, 1954
- Genre: Folk
- Label: Cadence
- Composer: George Bruns
- Lyricist: Thomas W. Blackburn

"The Ballad of Davy Crockett" is a song with music by George Bruns and lyrics by Thomas W. Blackburn. It was introduced on ABC's television series Disneyland, in the premiere episode of October 27, 1954.

== Background ==
Fess Parker is shown performing the song on a log cabin set in frontiersman clothes, accompanied by similarly attired musicians. The familiar refrain of "Davy, Davy Crockett" is heard throughout the song, which sings of the man's praises. The song would later be heard throughout the Disneyland television miniseries Davy Crockett, first telecast on December 15, 1954. This version was sung by the Mellomen. Parker played the role of Davy Crockett in the miniseries and continued in four other episodes made by Walt Disney Studios. Buddy Ebsen co-starred as George "Georgie" Russel, and Jeff York played legendary boatman Mike Fink.

Archie Bleyer, the president of Cadence Records, heard the song on the ABC telecast (December 15, 1954) and called Bill Hayes that night to gauge his interest in recording it. The next day, Hayes (vocals), Al Caiola (guitar), and Art Ryerson (guitar) recorded it in one take at an RCA studio in Manhattan. Other versions by Fess Parker and Tennessee Ernie Ford (recorded on February 7, 1955) quickly followed. All three versions made the Billboard magazine charts in 1955: Hayes' version made number 1 on the weekly chart (from March 26 through April 23) and number 7 for the year, Parker's reached number 6 on the weekly charts and number 31 for the year, while Ford's peaked at number 4 on the weekly country chart and number 5 on the weekly pop chart and charted at number 37 for the year. A fourth version, by bluegrass singer Mac Wiseman, reached number 10 on the radio charts in May 1955. The song also reached number 1 on the Cash Box chart, from March 26 through May 14, 1955. A contemporary version also exists by Western singing group the Sons of the Pioneers. Over ten million copies of the song were sold. Louis Armstrong also recorded the song in 1968.

In the United Kingdom, Hayes' version reached number 2 in the New Musical Express chart; Ford's version achieved number 3, and a version by UK singer Max Bygraves reached number 20. Several other British artistes recorded versions in 1955 and 1956, including Billy Cotton, Gary Miller, Ronnie Ronalde, and Dick James. Members of the Western Writers of America chose it as one of the Top 100 Western songs of all time.

== The Crockett craze ==
Walt Disney Productions launched a massive marketing campaign in the UK in 1955 to publicize the film Davy Crockett, King of the Wild Frontier (released in Britain in 1956) and to make the country's youth "Crockett conscious". There was already a "Crockett craze" in the U.S., where the episodes had become wildly popular. Crockett merchandise was produced en masse, the most iconic item being the imitation coonskin cap. The craze became immensely popular amongst schoolchildren, and the ballad made its way across the Atlantic Ocean. A French version by Annie Cordy was number 1 for five weeks in France in August 1956.

United States Senator Estes Kefauver of Tennessee wore a Davy Crockett cap during the 1956 campaign, as the Democratic vice-presidential nominee. Adlai Stevenson and Kefauver lost in the general election to incumbents Dwight D. Eisenhower and Richard Nixon.

The Crockett phenomenon is referenced in books of the time such as Back in the Jug Agane, one of the Molesworth series by Geoffrey Willans and Ronald Searle.

The craze was referenced in the 1985 film Back to the Future, which is set predominantly in 1955. In the film, the Fess Parker version of the song is heard on a jukebox inside Lou's Diner and, in a later scene, one of Lorraine Baines' brothers appears wearing a coonskin cap. The song is sung by the characters Henry and Sammy in the Country Bear Jamboree. The 2009 film Fantastic Mr. Fox opens with the eponymous fox playing the version of the song from Frontierland on his belt radio.

== Parodies ==
Several parodies were issued in 1955, including "Duvid Crockett" by Mickey Katz; "Pancho Lopez" by Eduardo Lalo Guerrero; "Ole Svenson" by Yogi Yorgesson; and "The Ballad of Davy Crew-Cut" by Homer and Jethro.

== Covers ==
- A 1955 single release on Dot Records by International Bluegrass Music Hall of Fame inductee Mac Wiseman reached the number 10 position on the Country charts.
- Also in 1955, Burl Ives released the song as a single on Decca.
- Annie Cordy's version, "La Ballade de Davy Crockett", was number 1 in the charts for five weeks in France in August 1956.
- Mary Wilson of The Supremes sung lead on a cover the group recorded for their album Diana Ross & the Supremes Sing Disney Classics in 1968. The album was shelved and never released, but the song still appeared on the 1986 compilation The Never-Before-Released Masters.
- A rendition was recorded and released on The Kentucky Headhunters' 1991 album Electric Barnyard, and was released as a single. It peaked at number 49 on the Billboard Hot Country Singles chart.
- They Might Be Giants covered the song, with modified lyrics, as "The Ballad of Davy Crockett (in Outer Space)" on their 2009 album Here Comes Science.
