= Songs from the Grass String Ranch =

Studio album by The Kentucky Headhunters
- Released: August 8, 2000
- Genre: Country rock, Southern rock
- Length: 45:56
- Label: Audium Entertainment/Koch Records
- Producer: The Kentucky Headhunters

The Kentucky Headhunters chronology
Stompin' Grounds (1997)	Songs from the Grass String Ranch (2000)	Soul (2003)

Professional ratings
Review scores
Source	Rating
AllMusic	3/5 stars
The Encyclopedia of Popular Music	2/5 stars
Entertainment Weekly	B−
USA Today	2.5/4 stars

Songs from the Grass String Ranch is the fifth studio album by the American country rock band the Kentucky Headhunters. It was released by Audium Entertainment in 2000. The album includes singles "Too Much to Lose", "Louisianna CoCo" and "Love That Woman." Although "Too Much to Lose" reached number 66 on the country charts, the other two singles failed to chart.

== Critical reception ==
Country Standard Time wrote that "otherwise crisp tunes 'Country Life' and 'Jessico' suffer from a stilted rock sound that doesn't quite fit Kentucky's motley crew."

== Track listing ==
All tracks are written by The Kentucky Headhunters; "Too Much to Lose", "Dry-Land Fish", "The Dreamin' Kind", and "Rock On" co-written by Verlon Dale Grissom.

No.	Title	Length
1.	"Grass String Ranch"	4:16
2.	"Back to the Sun"	5:02
3.	"Jessico"	3:22
4.	"Once in a While"	4:23
5.	"Love That Woman"	3:48
6.	"Too Much to Lose"	4:40
7.	"Louisianna CoCo"	3:58
8.	"Country Life"	3:37
9.	"Dry-Land Fish"	5:29
10.	"The Dreamin' Kind"	4:30
11.	"I Wish I Knew"	4:57
12.	"Rock On"	5:07

== Personnel ==
From Songs from the Grass String Ranch liner notes.

The Kentucky Headhunters

- Anthony Kenney - bass guitar, background vocals
- Greg Martin - lead guitar, rhythm guitar, 12-string guitar, acoustic guitar, mandolin, background vocals
- Doug Phelps - rhythm guitar, 12-string guitar, acoustic guitar, lead vocals (except "Dry-Land Fish" and "Louisianna CoCo"), background vocals
- Fred Young - drums, percussion; lead vocals on "Dry-Land Fish"
- Richard Young - rhythm guitar, background vocals; lead vocals on "Louisianna CoCo"

Additional musicians

- Joey Huffman - horns on "Grass String Ranch", strings on "I Wish I Knew"
- David Jessie - percussion on "Jessico"
- Kenny Weber - banjo on "Jessico"
- Reese Wynans - piano, Hammond B-3 organ

Technical

- David Barrick - recording
- Chris Fleming - engineering
- Mitchell Fox - executive production
- Robert Hammon - engineering
- The Kentucky Headhunters - production
- Rodney Mills - mixing, mastering
- John Nielsen - mixing
