= Henson Cargill =

American musician (1941–2007)

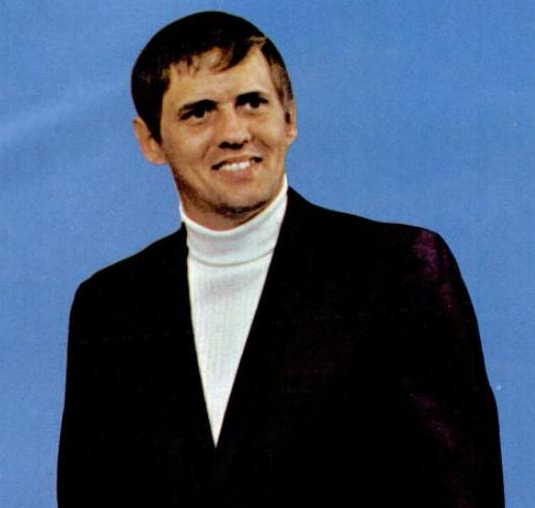
- Cargill in 1968

Background information
- Born: February 5, 1941; Oklahoma City, Oklahoma, U.S.
- Died: March 24, 2007 (aged 66) Oklahoma City, Oklahoma, U.S.
- Genres: Country
- Occupation: Singer
- Instrument: Guitar
- Years active: 1967–2007
- Labels: Monument, Mega, Atlantic, Copper Mountain

Henson Cargill (February 5, 1941 – March 24, 2007) was an American country music singer best known for the socially controversial 1968 country number-one hit "Skip a Rope". His music career began in Oklahoma in clubs around Oklahoma City and Tulsa. He earned national recognition after getting a Nashville producer to agree to produce "Skip a Rope".

Cargill had a number of Top-20 hits, including "Row Row Row" (1968), "None of My Business", and "The Most Uncomplicated Goodbye I Ever Heard" (1970). His later hits included "Some Old California Memory" and "Silence on the Line". He also had a television show and performed for many years in Reno and Las Vegas.

== Early life ==
Cargill was born in Oklahoma City; his family was active in politics and raised bison on a ranch outside Oklahoma City, where his grandfather, O. A. Cargill, served as mayor in the 1920s. Cargill graduated from Northwest Classen High School. Marrying his high school sweetheart, Marta, he moved to Fort Collins, Colorado, in the early 1960s to study veterinary medicine at Colorado State University. Returning to Oklahoma City, he worked as a court clerk, private investigator, and deputy sheriff.

== Music career ==
Cargill began his music career playing in clubs in and around Oklahoma City and Tulsa. While working the late shift as a deputy sheriff, Cargill received a visit from his friend and fellow musician Johnny Johnson, who told him of a seasoned and professional vocal group with whom he had been recording. Henson began recording locally at the Sully Studios with the Kimberleys as backup. They began to tour together all over the west.

In the mid-1960s, Cargill went to Nashville and recorded "Skip a Rope". He released his album on the Monument Label in 1967 and immediately scored in a big way with this first release. The song became a hit, spending five weeks at number one on the country chart in 1968, and also making his only top-25 appearance on the pop charts (making him a one-hit wonder in the pop music field). This success generated much media attention, and he was in demand on such TV programs as The Mike Douglas Show to The Tonight Show Starring Johnny Carson.

After "Skip a Rope", Cargill continued to have top-20 hits with such songs as "Row Row Row" (1968), "None of My Business" (his only other top 10) (1969), and "The Most Uncomplicated Goodbye I Ever Heard" (1970). He hosted a television show, Country Hayride, beginning in 1962, and performed for many years in Reno and Las Vegas. Johnny Cash was godfather to his oldest son, Cash. After leaving Monument Records, Henson moved to Mega Records in 1971, where he scored several minor hits. In 1973, he made a strong comeback to the charts when he signed with Atlantic Records and scored two top-30 hits in 1974 with "Some Old California Memory" and a version of Mac Davis' hit song "Stop and Smell the Roses". In 1980, he formed his own record label Copper Mountain Records, and scored his last top-30 hit that year with "Silence on the Line".

Cargill was one of the earliest guests on Bill Aken's radio show The Country Call Line in the mid-1980s, appearing uncompensated to help launch the show. He performed a half-hour segment with his story of Buford the Buffalo. In 1981, Henson gave up touring to open an Oklahoma City nightclub, Henson's.

== Later life and death ==
In the late 1980s, he retired to Oklahoma City, where he wed Sharon Simms on September 8, 1988. He died in Oklahoma City on March 24, 2007, aged 66, during surgery.

== Discography ==
=== Albums ===
Year	Album	Chart Positions		Label
Year	Album	US Country	US	Label
1968	Skip a Rope	4	179	Monument
1969	Coming On Strong	31	—	Monument
1969	None of My Business	—	—	Monument
1970	Uncomplicated	—	—	Monument
1972	On the Road	—	—	Mega
1973	This Is Henson Cargill Country	27	—	Atlantic
1982	In the Shadows	—	—	51 West
1988	All American Cowboy	—	—	Amethsyt

=== Singles ===
Year	Single	Chart Positions				Album
Year	Single	US Country	US	CAN Country	AU	Album
1967	"Skip a Rope"	1	25	1	38	Skip a Rope
1968	"Row Row Row"	11	—	3	90	Coming on Strong
1968	"She Thinks I'm on That Train"	39	—	34	—	Coming on Strong
1968	"It Just Don't Take Me Long to Say Goodbye"	—	—	—	86	Coming on Strong
1969	"None of My Business"	8	—	11	—	None of My Business
1969	"This Generation Shall Not Pass"	40	—	—	—	None of My Business
1969	"Then the Baby Came"	32	—	24	—	single only
1970	"What's My Name"	—	—	—	—	Uncomplicated
1970	"The Most Uncomplicated Goodbye I've Ever Heard"	18	—	—	—	Uncomplicated
1970	"Bless 'Em All"	—	—	—	—	singles only
1971	"Pencil Marks on the Wall"	44	—	—	—	singles only
1971	"Naked and Crying"	65	—	—	—	singles only
1972	"I Can't Face the Bed Alone"	64	—	—	—	"On The Road"
1972	"Oklahoma Hell"	—	—	—	—	"On The Road"
1972	"Red Skies Over Georgia"	62	—	—	—	"On The Road"
1973	"My '47 Chevy, My Honky Tonk Guitar and Me"	—	—	—	—	singles only
1973	"Some Old California Memory"	28	—	64	—	This Is Henson Cargill Country
1974	"She Still Comes to Me (To Pour the Wine)"	78	—	—	—	This Is Henson Cargill Country
1974	"Stop and Smell the Roses"	29	—	—	—	singles only
1975	"Deep in the Heart of Dixie"	—	—	—	—	singles only
1975	"Something to Hold On To"	—	—	—	—	singles only
1979	"Silence on the Line"	29	—	—	—	singles only
1980	"Have a Good Day"	67	—	—	—	singles only
