= Soul (The Kentucky Headhunters album) =

Studio album by The Kentucky Headhunters
- Released: May 6, 2003
- Genre: Rhythm and blues
- Label: Audium Entertainment/Koch Records
- Producer: The Kentucky Headhunters

The Kentucky Headhunters chronology
Songs from the Grass String Ranch (2000)	Soul (2003)	Big Boss Man (2005)

Professional ratings
Review scores
Source	Rating
Allmusic	3/5 stars

Soul is the sixth studio album released by American country rock and southern rock band The Kentucky Headhunters. It was released in 2003 on Audium Entertainment. No singles were released from the album; however, one of the tracks, "Have You Ever Loved a Woman?", was first a single for Freddie King in 1960.

== Track listing ==
All tracks are written by The Kentucky Headhunters, except where noted.

No.	Title	Writer(s)	Length
1.	"Everyday People"		3:59
2.	"That's Alright"		3:29
3.	"You Got It"		4:00
4.	"Lonely Nights"	The Kentucky Headhunters, Wade Bernard	3:59
5.	"We All Need It"		3:37
6.	"My Sunny Days"		4:22
7.	"Last Night I Met Carl Perkins"	The Kentucky Headhunters, Wade Bernard	3:55
8.	"I Still Wanna Be Your Man"	Eddie Hinton	3:43
9.	"Lookin' for Mr. Perfect"		3:49
10.	"Have You Ever Loved a Woman?"	Billy Myles	6:59
11.	"What You See, Is What You Get (Give Me Some Skin/Kentucky Jam)"		6:36

== Personnel ==
The Kentucky Headhunters

- Anthony Kenney – bass guitar, tambourine, harmonica, background vocals
- Greg Martin – lead guitar, acoustic guitar, rhythm guitar
- Doug Phelps – lead vocals on all tracks except "I Still Wanna Be Your Man" and "Have You Ever Loved a Woman", background vocals, rhythm guitar, cabasa, güiro
- Fred Young – drums, congas, tambourine
- Richard Young – acoustic guitar, rhythm guitar, background vocals, lead vocals on "I Still Wanna Be Your Man" and "Have You Ever Loved a Woman"

Guest musicians

- Robbie Bartlett – second lead vocals on "Everyday People"
- Chris Dunn – trombone
- Jim Horn – alto saxophone, tenor saxophone, baritone saxophone, horn arrangements
- Steve Patrick – trumpet
- Reese Wynans — Hammond organ

Technical

- David Barrick – engineer, mastering, mixing
- Mark Capps – engineer
- Mitchell Fox – executive producer
- Emmylou Harris – stylist, grooming
- Paul McGarry – guitar technician
- Steve Wilson – engineer
