= Rave On!! =

Studio album by The Kentucky Headhunters
- Released: 1993
- Studio: The Soundshop (Nashville, Tennessee)
- Genre: Country rock, Southern rock
- Length: 39:25
- Label: Mercury
- Producer: The Kentucky Headhunters

The Kentucky Headhunters chronology
Electric Barnyard (1991)	Rave On!! (1993)	That'll Work (1993)

Rave On!! is the third studio album released by the Southern American country rock band The Kentucky Headhunters. It was the first album recorded after the departure of brothers Ricky Lee Phelps and Doug Phelps, whose positions were replaced with lead vocalist Mark S. Orr and bass guitarist Anthony Kenney (who is the cousin of brothers Fred and Richard Young). The album produced three singles: "Honky Tonk Walkin'", "Blue Moon of Kentucky" and "Dixie Fried".

Three covers are included: "Dixie Fried" (originally by Carl Perkins), "My Gal" (originally by The Lovin' Spoonful) and "Blue Moon of Kentucky" (originally by Bill Monroe).

The album was reissued in December 2006 by CBUJ.

== Critical reception ==
Professional ratings
Review scores
Source	Rating
AllMusic	2/5 stars
Entertainment Weekly	C−

AllMusic's Brian Mansfield felt that the band's novelty wore off on this record. Mansfield noted that Mark Orr uses a "Southern rock wail" over the less than idiosyncratic original tracks, while concluding that "they've devolved into a redneck boogie group." Alanna Nash of Entertainment Weekly critiqued that the band replaced "their garage funk in the backwoods brine of classic country" and are "content to sprinkle down-home seasoning on warmed-over blues" on this album, concluding with: "Does this once-stunning band have a future? In "Underground", they evoke James Dean to be cool, a sure sign they're only a bargain bin away from oblivion."

== Track listing ==
All tracks are written by The Kentucky Headhunters (Anthony Kenney, Greg Martin, Mark S. Orr, Fred Young, and Richard Young), except where noted.

No.	Title	Writer(s)	Length
1.	"Dixie Fried"	Carl Perkins, Howard Griffin	2:10
2.	"Just Ask fo' Lucy"	The Kentucky Headhunters, Lonnie Mack	3:02
3.	"Honky Tonk Walkin'"		3:46
4.	"Redneck Girl"		2:25
5.	"Dizzie Miss Daisy"		3:36
6.	"Celina Tennessee"	The Kentucky Headhunters, Bobby N. Richey	2:48
7.	"The Ghost of Hank Williams"	The Kentucky Headhunters, Jimmy Gardner	4:08
8.	"Freedom Stomp"		2:54
9.	"Muddy Water"		4:33
10.	"My Gal"	John Sebastian, Erik Jacobsen	2:40
11.	"Blue Moon of Kentucky"	Bill Monroe	2:23
12.	"Underground"		5:08

== Personnel ==
Credits adapted from the album's liner notes.

The Kentucky Headhunters

- Greg Martin – electric guitar, slide guitar, background vocals
- Anthony Kenney – bass guitar, background vocals
- Mark S. Orr – lead vocals, background vocals
- Fred Young – drums, percussion, background vocals
- Richard Young – rhythm guitar, background vocals; piano on "Just Ask fo' Lucy"

Additional musicians

- John Barlow Jarvis – piano on "Blue Moon of Kentucky"
- David Wayne Jessie – tambourine on "Honky Tonk Walkin'"
- John Lloyd Miller – tambourine on "Blue Moon of Kentucky"
- Richard Ripani – piano on "Honky Tonk Walkin'", "Celina Tennessee" and "The Ghost of Hank Williams"

Production

- Mike Bradley – mixing
- Mark Capps – assistant engineering
- John Dickson – assistant engineering
- Steve Wilson – assistant engineering
- Howie Weinberg – mastering (Masterdisk)

Imagery

- Barnes & Company – album graphics
- Bill Barnes – art direction, photography
- Wesley Ligon – design
- Jerry Keeter – hand lettering
- Alan Messer – group photography
- Kim Markovchick – executive art direction

== Chart performance ==
Chart (1993)	Peak position
U.S. Billboard Top Country Albums	22
U.S. Billboard 200	102
