= Pickin' on Nashville =

Studio album by the Kentucky Headhunters
- Released: October 17, 1989
- Studios: Sound Shop (Nashville, Tennessee)
- Genres: Country rock, Southern rock
- Length: 34:21
- Label: Mercury
- Producer: The Kentucky Headhunters

The Kentucky Headhunters chronology
| Pickin' on Nashville (1989) | Electric Barnyard (1991) |

Singles from Pickin' on Nashville
- 1. "Walk Softly on This Heart of Mine" Released: September 1989; 2. "Dumas Walker" Released: January 12, 1990; 3. "Oh Lonesome Me" Released: May 1990; 4. "Rock 'n' Roll Angel" Released: October 13, 1990

Pickin' on Nashville is the debut studio album by American country rock/southern rock band the Kentucky Headhunters. It features the singles "Walk Softly on This Heart of Mine", "Oh Lonesome Me", "Dumas Walker", and "Rock 'n' Roll Angel", all of which charted in the Top 40 on the Hot Country Songs charts. "Oh Lonesome Me" was also the highest charting, at No. 8. The album won a Grammy Award for Best Country Performance by a Duo or Group with Vocal for the band in 1991.

"Walk Softly on This Heart of Mine" is a cover of a Bill Monroe song, "Skip a Rope" a cover of a Henson Cargill song, and "Oh Lonesome Me" a cover of a Don Gibson song. After brothers Ricky Lee and Doug Phelps left the band in 1992 to form the duo Brother Phelps; they recorded "Ragtop" on their second album (1994's Any Way the Wind Blows). Doug rejoined the band in 1997.

== Critical reception ==
Professional ratings
Review scores
| Source | Rating |
|---|---|
| AllMusic | 4.5/5 stars |

The Tulsa World noted that the band "have more in common with the Georgia Satellites than just a similar name—their bar-band, three- and four-chord boogie has the same loose, endearingly sappy quality."

== Track listing ==
| No. | Title | Writer(s) | Length |
|---|---|---|---|
| 1. | "Walk Softly on This Heart of Mine" | Bill Monroe, Jake Landers | 3:44 |
| 2. | "Dumas Walker" | The Kentucky Headhunters | 2:50 |
| 3. | "Rag Top" | Doug Phelps, Ricky Lee Phelps | 3:11 |
| 4. | "Rock 'n' Roll Angel" | Richard Young | 3:51 |
| 5. | "Smooth" | R. L. Phelps, Samuel Edward Crowe | 4:27 |
| 6. | "High Steppin' Daddy" | Ralph Wade Martin | 2:57 |
| 7. | "Skip a Rope" | Glenn Tubb, Jack Moran | 2:31 |
| 8. | "Some Folks Like to Steal" | R. Young, Fred Young, Martin | 2:51 |
| 9. | "Oh Lonesome Me" | Don Gibson | 3:09 |
| 10. | "My Daddy Was a Milkman" | The Kentucky Headhunters | 4:28 |

== Personnel ==
The Kentucky Headhunters

- Greg Martin - lead guitar
- Doug Phelps - background vocals, bass guitar
- Ricky Lee Phelps - lead vocals
- Fred Young - drums
- Richard Young - rhythm guitar

Additional musician

- Richard Ripani - Hammond B-3 organ on "Oh Lonesome Me", "cheesy organ" on "Rock 'n' Roll Angel"

Technical

- Mike Bradley - recording, mixing
- The Kentucky Headhunters - producer, arrangement
- Glenn Meadows - mastering
- Jim Zumwalt - executive producer

== Chart performance ==
=== Weekly charts ===
| Chart (1989–1990) | Peak position |
|---|---|
| US Billboard 200 | 41 |
| US Top Country Albums (Billboard) | 2 |

=== Year-end charts ===
| Chart (1990) | Position |
|---|---|
| US Billboard 200 | 58 |
| US Top Country Albums (Billboard) | 3 |
| Chart (1992) | Position |
| US Top Country Albums (Billboard) | 72 |

== Certifications ==
| Region | Certification | Certified units/sales |
|---|---|---|
| Canada (Music Canada) | 2× Platinum | 200,000^{^} |
| United States (RIAA) | 2× Platinum | 2,000,000^{^} |
^{^} Shipments figures based on certification alone.
