= Dumas Walker =

Single by The Kentucky Headhunters

from the album Pickin' on Nashville
- B-side: "High Steppin' Daddy"
- Released: January 12, 1990
- Recorded: 1989
- Genre: Country rock, southern rock, rock and roll, rockabilly
- Length: 2:50
- Label: PolyGram/Mercury
- Songwriter: The Kentucky Headhunters
- Producer: The Kentucky Headhunters

The Kentucky Headhunters singles chronology
"Walk Softly on This Heart of Mine" (1989)	"Dumas Walker" (1990)	"Oh Lonesome Me" (1990)

"Dumas Walker" is a song that was written and recorded by Southern country rock band The Kentucky Headhunters. It was released in January 1990 as the second single from their 1989 album Pickin' on Nashville. It reached number 15 on Country charts, and was written by the band's five members at the time.

== Content ==
The song begins with the command for the narrator's entourage to "all go down to Dumas Walker" in order to purchase a "slaw burger, fries and a bottle of Ski", and then for the items to be brought to his "baby" and himself. Following the command, the narrator describes a situation when he and his girlfriend were on the way to the "drive-in on a Saturday night with a six-pack of Lite." He explains that he would proceed to go to Dumas Walker's "after the show" where Dumas and others would be shooting marbles behind the store. The call of "let's all go, down to Dumas Walker" then continues as the chorus is sung. Next, the singer describes Dumas Walker (played by Johnnie Johnson in the music video) as closely adhering to the law. He is alluded to as the "marble king". Following this, the chorus is sung for the final time, and the song concludes.

== Background ==
According to The Kentucky Headhunters' band member Doug Phelps, the song refers to a retailer and world class marbles champion named "Dumas" from Moss, Tennessee, who owned a "package" shop near the Kentucky-Tennessee state line, close to Annie Hanrahan's place. The shop sold "beer, snacks [and] fireworks" and was "part of the Kentucky boys' lives growing up." The lyrics that reflect a desire to purchase a "slaw burger, fries, and a bottle of Ski" are completely unrelated to the real-life "Dumas Walker", referring to a restaurant in Greensburg, Kentucky, called Adolphus Ennis, where the band would go following a show.

At first, the record label did not want to include the song on the Kentucky Headhunters' album because they believed it was too regional. However, the Headhunters pushed for the song to be on the album because of the reaction it received during live shows.

== Critical reception ==
A review from Cash Box magazine was positive, stating that "'Dumas Walker', produced and arranged by the Heads themselves, opens our ears to electrifying country nestled in sweet southern comfort. This explosion of a tune, delivered with an almost daring harmony, should also find sweet comfort at the top of the chart."

== Chart performance ==
Chart (1990)	Peak position
Canada Country Singles (RPM)	50
US Hot Country Songs (Billboard)	15
