= Oh Lonesome Me =

1957 song by Don Gibson

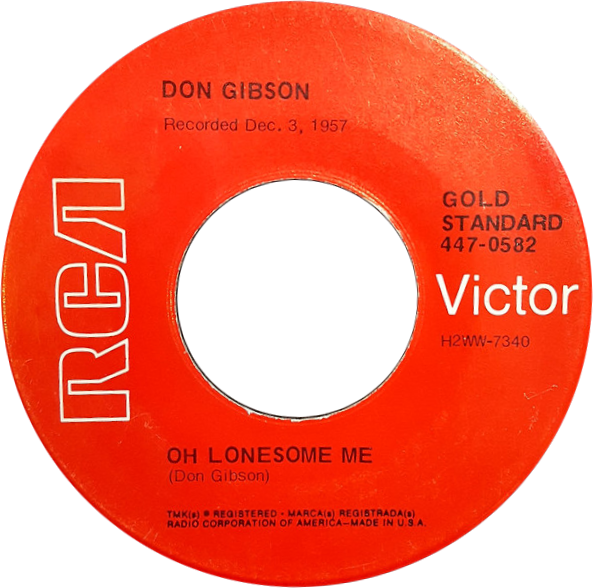
- One of US reissues

Single by Don Gibson

from the album Oh Lonesome Me
- B-side: "I Can't Stop Loving You"
- Written: June 7, 1957
- Published: February 17, 1958 Acuff-Rose Publications, Inc.
- Released: December 1957
- Recorded: December 3, 1957
- Studio: RCA Victor (Nashville, Tennessee)
- Genre: Country
- Length: 2:26
- Label: RCA Victor
- Songwriter: Don Gibson
- Producer: Chet Atkins

Don Gibson singles chronology
"Sweet Dreams" (1956)	"Oh Lonesome Me" (1957)	"Blue Blue Day" (1958)

"Oh Lonesome Me"

Single by The Kentucky Headhunters

from the album Pickin' on Nashville
- B-side: "My Daddy Was a Milkman"
- Released: May 1990
- Genre: Country rock, rockabilly, rock and roll, southern rock
- Length: 3:12
- Label: Mercury
- Songwriter: Don Gibson
- Producer: The Kentucky Headhunters

The Kentucky Headhunters singles chronology
"Dumas Walker" (1990)	"Oh Lonesome Me" (1990)	"Rock 'n' Roll Angel" (1990)

"Oh Lonesome Me" is a popular song written and recorded in December 1957 by Don Gibson with Chet Atkins producing it for RCA Victor in Nashville. Released in 1958, the song topped the country chart for eight non-consecutive weeks. On what became the Billboard Hot 100, it peaked at No. 7. It was Gibson's only Top 10 hit on the pop chart. Its B-side was "I Can't Stop Loving You", which peaked at No. 7 on the C&W Jockey charts and became a standard song about unrequited love. The vocal backings on both songs were provided by the Jordanaires.

== The Kentucky Headhunters version ==
The song was covered by The Kentucky Headhunters in 1990. Their version went to number 8, which was the band's highest-peaking single.

=== Chart performance ===
Chart (1990)	Peak position
Canada Country Singles (RPM)	19
US Hot Country Songs (Billboard)	8

=== Year-end charts ===
Chart (1990)	Position
US Country Songs (Billboard)	73

== In popular culture ==
The Stand Oh Lonesome Me from the seventh part of the Japanese Anime/Manga series JoJo's Bizarre Adventure is named after the song.

== Cover versions ==
- 1959: Sacha Distel recorded a French version "Oh ! Quelle Nuit (Lonesome Me)".
- 1960: Bob Luman's rendition reached No. 105 on the U.S. Billboard Pop chart
- 1961: Johnny Cash (went to No. 13)
- 1962: Ann-Margret on her album On the Way Up
- 1962: Craig Douglas released a cover in the UK on Decca Records under the production of Bunny Lewis. It entered the UK singles chart on October 20, 1962, and stayed there for twelve weeks; its best position was at No. 11
- 1962: Ray Charles for his album Modern Sounds in Country and Western Music Volume Two
- 1963: The Everly Brothers on their album "The Everly Brothers Sing Great Country Hits
- 1966: Bobbi Martin's version reached No. 134 on the U.S. Billboard Pop chart and No. 64 Country
- 1970: Neil Young (slower version, on After the Gold Rush)
- 1970: Stonewall Jackson (went to No. 63)
- 1978: Loretta Lynn and the Muppets on episode 308 of The Muppet Show
- 1987: Austrian schlager singer Freddy Quinn
