= 25th Academy of Country Music Awards =

US music awards ceremony in 1990

- Date: April 25, 1990
- Location: Pantages Theatre, Los Angeles, California
- Hosted by: The Judds; Alabama; George Strait; Tammy Wynette

Highlights
- Most wins: Clint Black (4)
- Most nominations: Clint Black; Hank Williams Jr. (5 each)

Television/radio coverage
- Network: NBC

The 25th Academy of Country Music Awards was held on April 25, 1990, at the Pantages Theatre, in Los Angeles, California. The ceremony was hosted by The Judds, Alabama, George Strait, and Tammy Wynette.

== Winners and nominees ==
Winners are shown in bold.

Entertainer of the Year	Album of the Year
**George Strait**; Alabama; Dolly Parton; Randy Travis; Hank Williams Jr.	**Killin' Time — Clint Black**; Diamonds & Dirt — Rodney Crowell; Old 8x10 — Randy Travis; Will the Circle Be Unbroken: Volume Two — Nitty Gritty Dirt Band; Willow in the Wind — Kathy Mattea
Top Female Vocalist of the Year	Top Male Vocalist of the Year
**Kathy Mattea**; k.d. lang; Reba McEntire; Dolly Parton; Tanya Tucker	**Clint Black**; Rodney Crowell; Ricky Van Shelton; George Strait; Randy Travis
Top Vocal Group of the Year	Top Vocal Duo of the Year
**Restless Heart**; Alabama; Highway 101; Shenandoah; Statler Brothers	**The Judds**; Baillie & the Boys; Buck Owens and Ringo Starr; Sweethearts of the Rodeo; Hank Williams and Hank Williams Jr.
Single Record of the Year	Song of the Year
"**A Better Man**" — **Clint Black**; "If Tomorrow Never Comes" — Garth Brooks; "I'm No Stranger to the Rain" — Keith Whitley; "There's a Tear in My Beer" — Hank Williams and Hank Williams Jr.; "Timber, I'm Falling in Love" — Patty Loveless	**"Where've You Been"** — **Jon Vezner, Don Henry**; "After All This Time" — Rodney Crowell; "If Tomorrow Never Comes" — Garth Brooks, Kent Blazy; "Killin' Time" — Clint Black, Hayden Nicholas; "There's a Tear in My Beer" — Hank Williams
Top New Male Vocalist	Top New Female Vocalist
**Clint Black**; Garth Brooks; Lionel Cartwright	**Mary Chapin Carpenter**; Daniele Alexander; Jann Browne
Top New Vocal Duo or Group	Video of the Year
**The Kentucky Headhunters**; Shenandoah; Wild Rose	**"There's a Tear in My Beer"** — **Hank Williams and Hank Williams Jr.**; "Cathy's Clown" — Reba McEntire; "High Cotton" — Alabama; "Planet Texas" — Kenny Rogers; "Why'd You Come in Here Lookin' Like That" — Dolly Parton

== Performers ==
Performer(s)	Song(s)
Alabama; The Judds; George Strait; Tammy Wynette	"Pass It On Down"
Lionel Cartwright; Daniele Alexander	New Artist Medley #1 "I Watched It All (On My Radio)" "She's There"
The Judds	"Guardian Angels"
The Kentucky Headhunters; Jann Browne	New Artist Medley #2 "Dumas Walker" "Tell Me Why"
Randy Travis	"Hard Rock Bottom of Your Heart"
Clint Black; Mary Chapin Carpenter	New Artist Medley #3 "A Better Man" "Never Had It So Good"
Kathy Mattea	"Where've You Been"
Larry Gatlin & the Gatlin Brothers; Dwight Yoakam; Lacy J. Dalton; T. Graham Brown; Restless Heart; Janie Fricke; Mickey Gilley	25th Anniversary Country Medley "Mammas Don't Let Your Babies Grow Up to Be Cowboys" "The Most Beautiful Girl" "All the Gold in California" "He Stopped Loving Her Today" "Lucille" "Okie from Muskogee" "Help Me Make It Through the Night" "Satin Sheets" "Coal Miner's Daughter" "It's Four in the Morning" "King of the Road" "A Boy Named Sue" "Forever and Ever, Amen" "Elvira" "Mountain Music" "Easy Loving" "Stand by Your Man" "9 to 5" "For the Good Times" "Gentle on My Mind" "Don't the Girls All Get Prettier at Closing Time" "Take Me Home, Country Roads"
Hank Williams Jr.	"Good Friends, Good Whiskey, Good Lovin'"
Wild Rose; Garth Brooks; Shenandoah	New Artist Medley #4 "Breaking New Ground" "If Tomorrow Never Comes" "Two Dozen Roses"
George Strait	"Love Without End, Amen"
Tammy Wynette	"Let's Call It a Day Today"

== Presenters ==
Presenter(s)	Notes
Eddie Rabbitt; Michele Greene; Gary Morris	Single Record of the Year
Ned Beatty; Sweethearts of the Rodeo	Video of the Year
Patty Loveless; Josh Taylor	Top Vocal Duo of the Year
William Shatner; Baillie & the Boys	Album of the Year
Rodney Crowell; Ricky Van Shelton	Top Female Vocalist of the Year
Vince Gill; Nina Blackwood	Top Vocal Group of the Year
Eddie Raven; Earl Thomas Conley; Park Overall	Top New Female Vocalist; Top New Vocal Duo or Group; Top New Male Vocalist
Highway 101; Holly Dunn	Song of the Year
Rita Coolidge; Leeza Gibbons	Top Male Vocalist of the Year
Wayne Newton; Kitty Wells	Entertainer of the Year
