= List of RPM number-one country singles of 1990 =

These are the Canadian number-one country songs of 1990, per the RPM Country Tracks chart.

Issue date	Title	Artist	Source
January 13	A Woman in Love	Ronnie Milsap	
January 20	Who's Lonely Now	Highway 101	
January 27	Many a Long and Lonesome Highway	Rodney Crowell	
February 3	It Ain't Nothin'	Keith Whitley	
February 10	Nobody's Home	Clint Black	
February 17	Statue of a Fool	Ricky Van Shelton	
February 24	Southern Star	Alabama	
March 3	On Second Thought	Eddie Rabbitt	
March 10	On Second Thought	Eddie Rabbitt	
March 17	No Matter How High	The Oak Ridge Boys	
March 24	Chains	Patty Loveless	
March 31	Hard Rock Bottom of Your Heart	Randy Travis	
April 7	Hard Rock Bottom of Your Heart	Randy Travis	
April 14	Hard Rock Bottom of Your Heart	Randy Travis	
April 21	Not Counting You	Garth Brooks	
April 28	Love on Arrival	Dan Seals	
May 5	Stranger Things Have Happened	Ronnie Milsap	
May 12	Here in the Real World	Alan Jackson	
May 19	Help Me Hold On	Travis Tritt	
May 26	Help Me Hold On	Travis Tritt	
June 2	Walkin' Away	Clint Black	
June 9	Walkin' Away	Clint Black	
June 16	I've Cried My Last Tear for You	Ricky Van Shelton	
June 23	Love Without End, Amen	George Strait	
June 30	Love Without End, Amen	George Strait	
July 7	Walk On	Reba McEntire	
July 14	Love Without End, Amen	George Strait	
July 21	The Dance	Garth Brooks	
July 28	The Dance	Garth Brooks	
August 4	The Dance	Garth Brooks	
August 11	He Walked on Water	Randy Travis	
August 18	Good Times	Dan Seals	
August 25	I'm Gonna Be Somebody	Travis Tritt	
September 1	Next to You, Next to Me	Shenandoah	
September 8	Next to You, Next to Me	Shenandoah	
September 15	Nothing's News	Clint Black	
September 22	Jukebox in My Mind	Alabama	
September 29	Jukebox in My Mind	Alabama	
October 6	I Meant Every Word He Said	Ricky Van Shelton	
October 13	Friends in Low Places	Garth Brooks	
October 20	Friends in Low Places	Garth Brooks	
October 27	Friends in Low Places	Garth Brooks	
November 3	You Lie	Reba McEntire	
November 10	You Lie	Reba McEntire	
November 17	Too Cold at Home	Mark Chesnutt	
November 24	Home	Joe Diffie	
December 1	You Really Had Me Going	Holly Dunn	
December 8	Back in My Younger Days	Don Williams	
December 15	Come Next Monday	K. T. Oslin	
December 22	Come Next Monday	K. T. Oslin	

== See also ==
- 1990 in music
- List of number-one country singles of 1990 (U.S.)
