= Spend My Time (song) =

Single by Clint Black

from the album Spend My Time
- B-side: "We All Fall Down"
- Released: October 20, 2003
- Genre: Country
- Length: 4:06 (album version); 3:49 (single version)
- Label: Equity Music Group
- Songwriters: Clint Black; Hayden Nicholas
- Producer: Clint Black

Clint Black singles chronology
"I Raq and Roll" (2003)	"Spend My Time" (2003)	"The Boogie Man" (2004)

"Spend My Time" is a song co-written and recorded by American country music artist Clint Black. It was released in October 2003 as the second single and title track from his album Spend My Time. It peaked at number 16 in the United States. The song was written by Black and Hayden Nicholas.

== Background and writing ==
Black said that this song was the result of many hours spent assessing his direction personally and professionally. He stated that it is about deciding to make the best use of his time.

== Content ==
The song is a ballad that discusses how one's time is spent and to appreciate the value in every moment.

== Critical reception ==
Chuck Taylor, of Billboard magazine reviewed the song favorably saying that the song "signals an exciting new chapter in Black's already impressive career." A review in People said, "While Black once sang about "Killin' Time" on his 1989 debut of the same name, here he sings, "I'm gonna spend my time like it's going out of style" on the easygoing title track." Craig Havighurst of Entertainment Weekly was less favorable, saying that the song "drags", and Brian Mansfield of USA Today said that "Even in a lovely number such as Spend My Time, Black chooses financial metaphors that ultimately cloud his point rather than enhancing it."

== Music video ==
The music video was directed by Clint Black himself and premiered in late 2003. It features Black on the road on his tour bus and performing in concert.

== Charts ==
"Spend My Time" debuted at number 43 on the U.S. Billboard Hot Country Singles & Tracks for the week of November 1, 2003.

Chart (2003–2004)	Peak position
US Hot Country Songs (Billboard)	16
US Bubbling Under Hot 100 (Billboard)	2

=== Year-end charts ===
Chart (2004)	Position
US Country Songs (Billboard)	60
