= List of Top Country Albums number ones of 1990 =

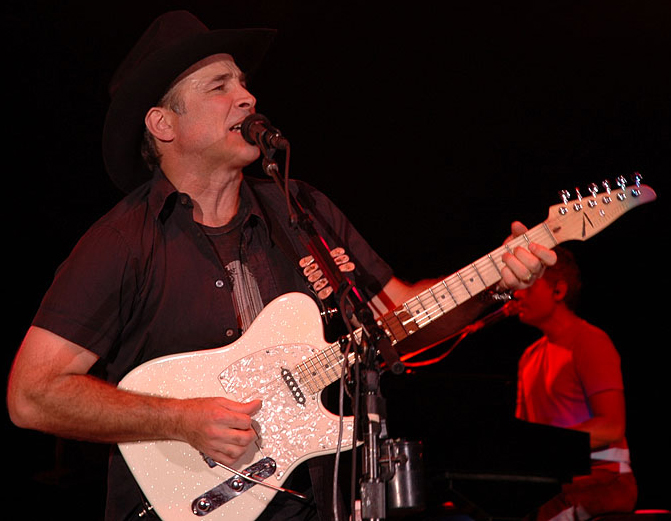
Clint Black's album Killin' Time, which had first reached number one in 1989, continued to spend time in the top spot for much of 1990.

Top Country Albums is a chart that ranks the top-performing country music albums in the United States, published by Billboard. In 1990, seven different albums topped the chart, based on sales reports submitted by a representative sample of stores nationwide.

In the issue of Billboard dated January 6, Randy Travis was at number one with the album No Holdin' Back, its 10th week in the top spot. It remained at number one through the issue dated January 20 before being displaced by Killin' Time by Clint Black. Black's album had spent six weeks at number one the previous fall before No Holdin' Back replaced it atop the chart; it would have three separate spells in the top spot between January and October 1990 and add a further 25 weeks to its total, making it the second-longest-running Top Country Albums number one to date. Black returned to number one in December with Put Yourself in My Shoes, which was the final number one of the year. Travis also achieved two number ones in 1990, as he spent a single week in the top spot in November with Heroes & Friends; it was his fifth number one in a little over four years but would be his final appearance in the top spot.

In October, Garth Brooks reached number one for the first time with No Fences. Over the next two and a half years Brooks would dominate the top of the Top Country Albums chart, spending a total of 90 weeks at number one with No Fences and his subsequent two albums. In addition to his success on both the country music albums and singles charts, Brooks would experience a level of mainstream popularity and success unprecedented for a country artist; by the following year No Fences was recognized as the highest-selling country album of all time, and by 2019 it had sold 17 million copies. Brooks is ranked by the Recording Industry Association of America as the best-selling solo albums artist in the United States of any genre with more than 130 million domestic units sold by 2015, second only to the Beatles in overall album sales.

== Chart history ==
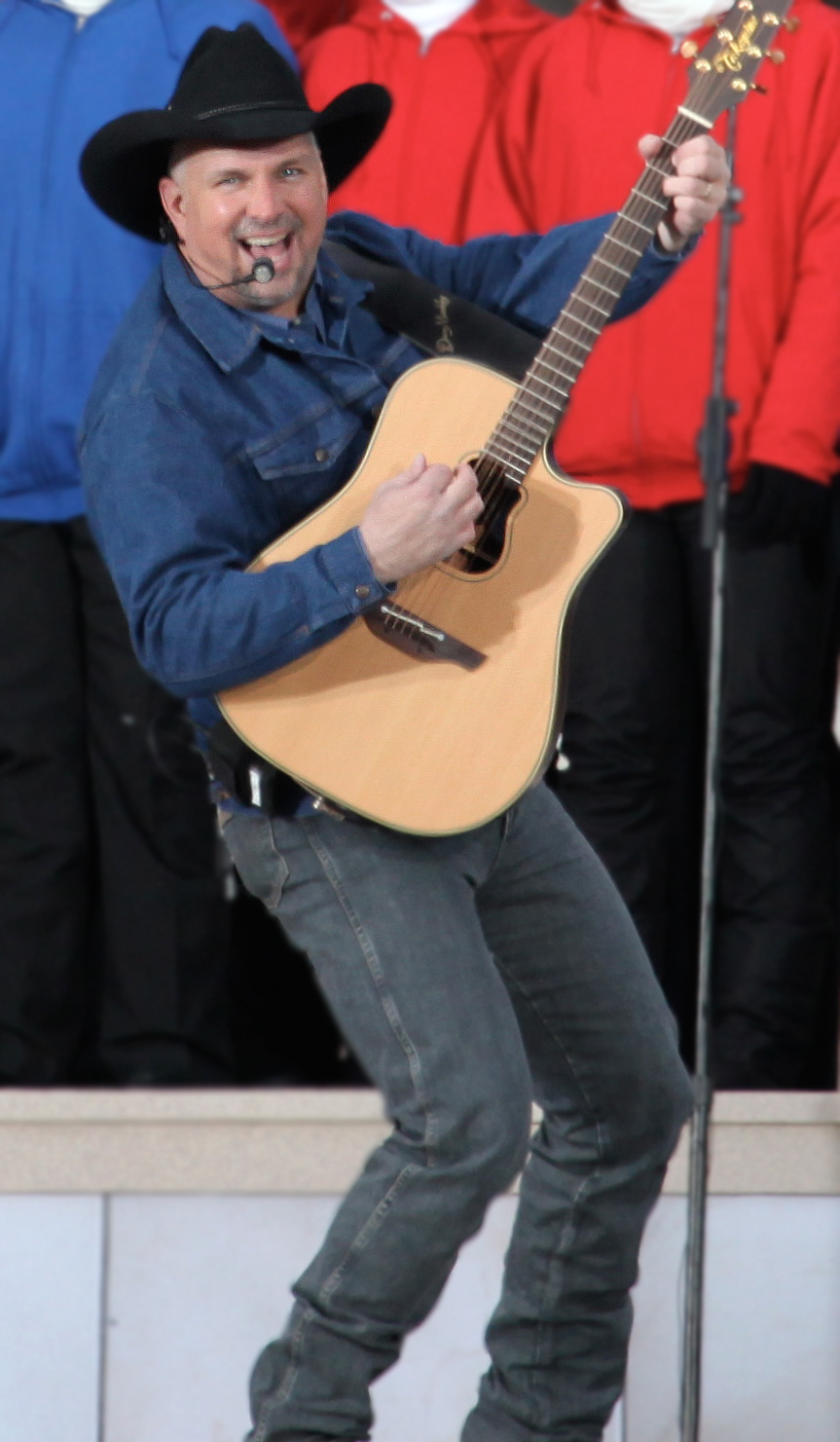
Garth Brooks reached number one for the first time in 1990. He would go on to become one of the most successful artists of all time, not only in country music but across all genres.

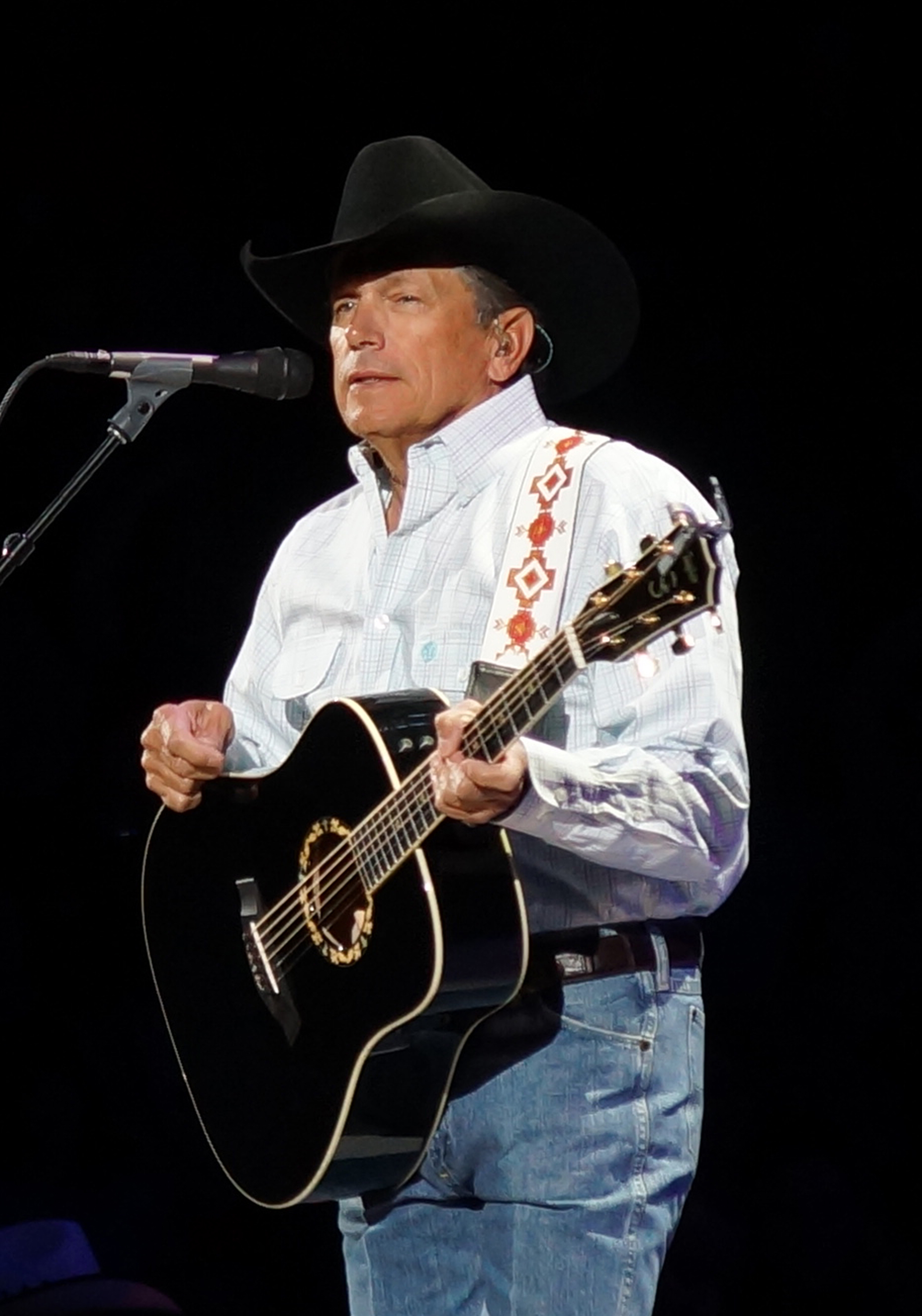
Livin' It Up was the fifth consecutive number one for George Strait.

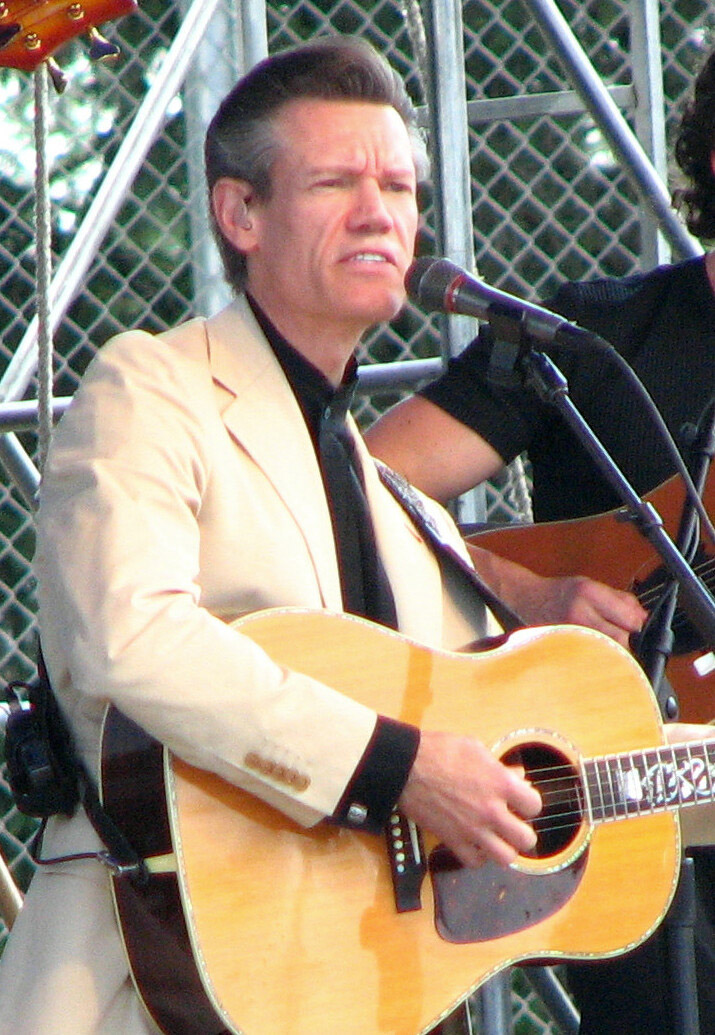
Randy Travis had two number ones in 1990, but they would prove to be his final chart-toppers.

Issue date	Title	Artist(s)	Ref.
January 6	No Holdin' Back	Randy Travis	
January 13	No Holdin' Back	Randy Travis	
January 20	No Holdin' Back	Randy Travis	
January 27	Killin' Time	Clint Black	
February 3	Killin' Time	Clint Black	
February 10	Killin' Time	Clint Black	
February 17	Killin' Time	Clint Black	
February 24	Killin' Time	Clint Black	
March 3	RVS III	Ricky Van Shelton	
March 10	RVS III	Ricky Van Shelton	
March 17	RVS III	Ricky Van Shelton	
March 24	RVS III	Ricky Van Shelton	
March 31	RVS III	Ricky Van Shelton	
April 7	RVS III	Ricky Van Shelton	
April 14	RVS III	Ricky Van Shelton	
April 21	RVS III	Ricky Van Shelton	
April 28	RVS III	Ricky Van Shelton	
May 5	Killin' Time	Clint Black	
May 12	Killin' Time	Clint Black	
May 19	Killin' Time	Clint Black	
May 26	Killin' Time	Clint Black	
June 2	Killin' Time	Clint Black	
June 9	Killin' Time	Clint Black	
June 16	Killin' Time	Clint Black	
June 23	Killin' Time	Clint Black	
June 30	Killin' Time	Clint Black	
July 7	Killin' Time	Clint Black	
July 14	Livin' It Up	George Strait	
July 21	Livin' It Up	George Strait	
July 28	Livin' It Up	George Strait	
August 4	Killin' Time	Clint Black	
August 11	Killin' Time	Clint Black	
August 18	Killin' Time	Clint Black	
August 25	Killin' Time	Clint Black	
September 1	Killin' Time	Clint Black	
September 8	Killin' Time	Clint Black	
September 15	Killin' Time	Clint Black	
September 22	Killin' Time	Clint Black	
September 29	Killin' Time	Clint Black	
October 6	Killin' Time	Clint Black	
October 13	No Fences	Garth Brooks	
October 20	No Fences	Garth Brooks	
October 27	No Fences	Garth Brooks	
November 3	No Fences	Garth Brooks	
November 10	No Fences	Garth Brooks	
November 17	No Fences	Garth Brooks	
November 24	Heroes & Friends	Randy Travis	
December 1	No Fences	Garth Brooks	
December 8	No Fences	Garth Brooks	
December 15	No Fences	Garth Brooks	
December 22	Put Yourself in My Shoes	Clint Black	
December 29	Put Yourself in My Shoes	Clint Black	
