= List of Hot Country Singles & Tracks number ones of 1990 =

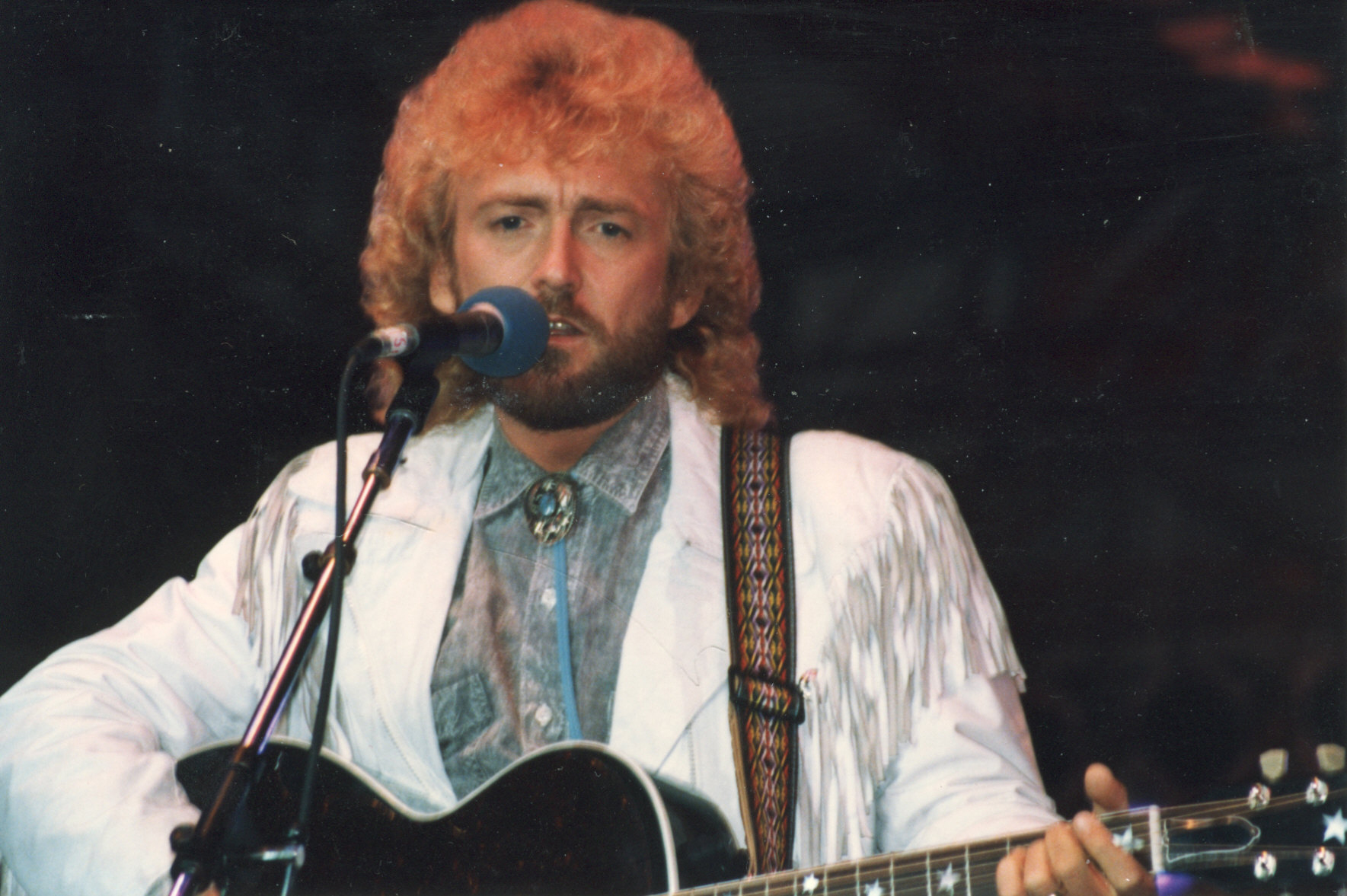
Keith Whitley, who died the previous year, had a posthumous number one in January 1990 with "It Ain't Nothin'".

Hot Country Songs is a chart that ranks the top-performing country music songs in the United States, published by Billboard magazine. In 1990, 24 different songs topped the chart in 52 issues of the magazine. The chart was published under the title Hot Country Singles through the February 10 issue and Hot Country Singles & Tracks thereafter. With effect from the January 20 issue, Billboard discontinued its longstanding methodology of compiling the chart based on playlists submitted by country music radio stations and sales reports submitted by stores and instead began basing the chart on weekly airplay data from radio stations compiled by Nielsen Broadcast Data Systems.

At the start of the year, the number one song on the chart was Highway 101's "Who's Lonely Now", which had been at the top of the chart since the issue of Billboard dated December 30, 1989. It remained in the top spot for one further week in 1990 before being replaced by "It Ain't Nothin'" by Keith Whitley. This was the second of two posthumous number ones for Whitley, who had died in May of the previous year. Three months later, Whitley's widow Lorrie Morgan topped the chart for the first time with "Five Minutes". Other artists who topped the chart for the first time in 1990 were Travis Tritt, who spent one week at number one with "Help Me Hold On", and Joe Diffie, who reached number one with his debut single "Home".

The change in the chart's methodology led to an increase in the length of time songs spent in the top spot; in 1990, thirteen songs spent more than one week at number compared with just two in the previous year. When Randy Travis spent four weeks at the top of the chart in March and April with "Hard Rock Bottom of Your Heart", it was the first time that a song had spent as long in the top spot since "Mammas Don't Let Your Babies Grow Up to Be Cowboys" by Waylon Jennings and Willie Nelson in 1978. George Strait's "Love Without End, Amen", which topped the chart for five weeks in June and July, was the nineteenth number-one country song of his career but the first to spend more than one week at the top. The five weeks spent at the top by the song was the longest run at number one by a song. Strait also spent four weeks at number one with "I've Come to Expect It from You" to give him a total of nine weeks at the top of the chart in 1990, the most by any artist. Clint Black, Dan Seals, Garth Brooks and Alabama were the only other acts to place two songs at number one during the year. Strait's "I've Come to Expect It from You" was the final number one of the year.

== Chart history ==
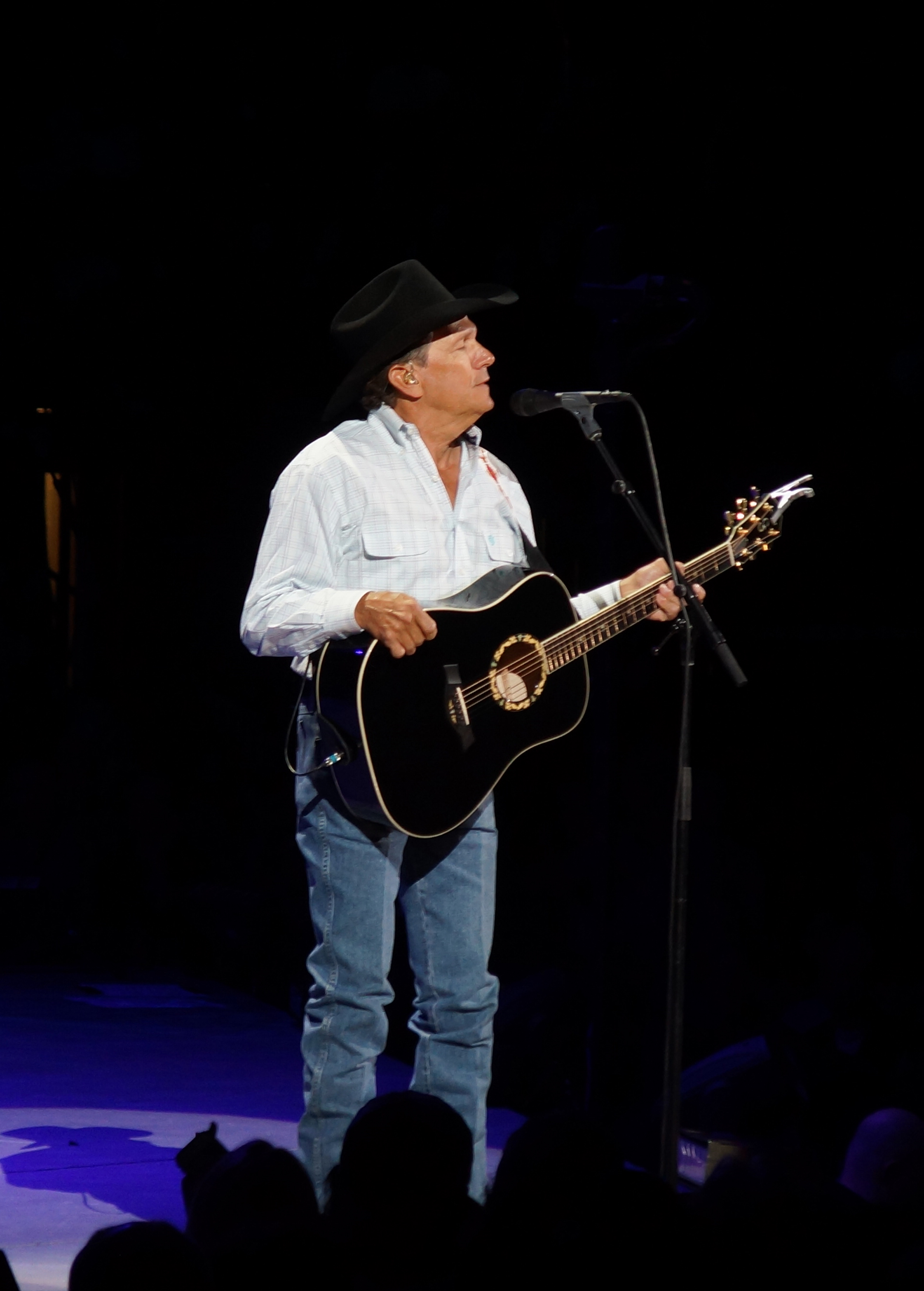
George Strait spent nine weeks at number one in 1990, the most by any artist.

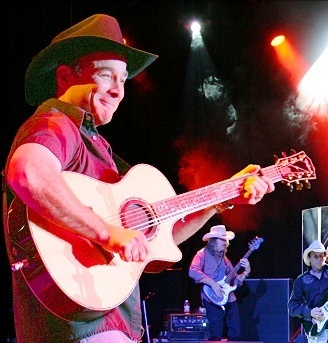
Clint Black had two chart-toppers in 1990.

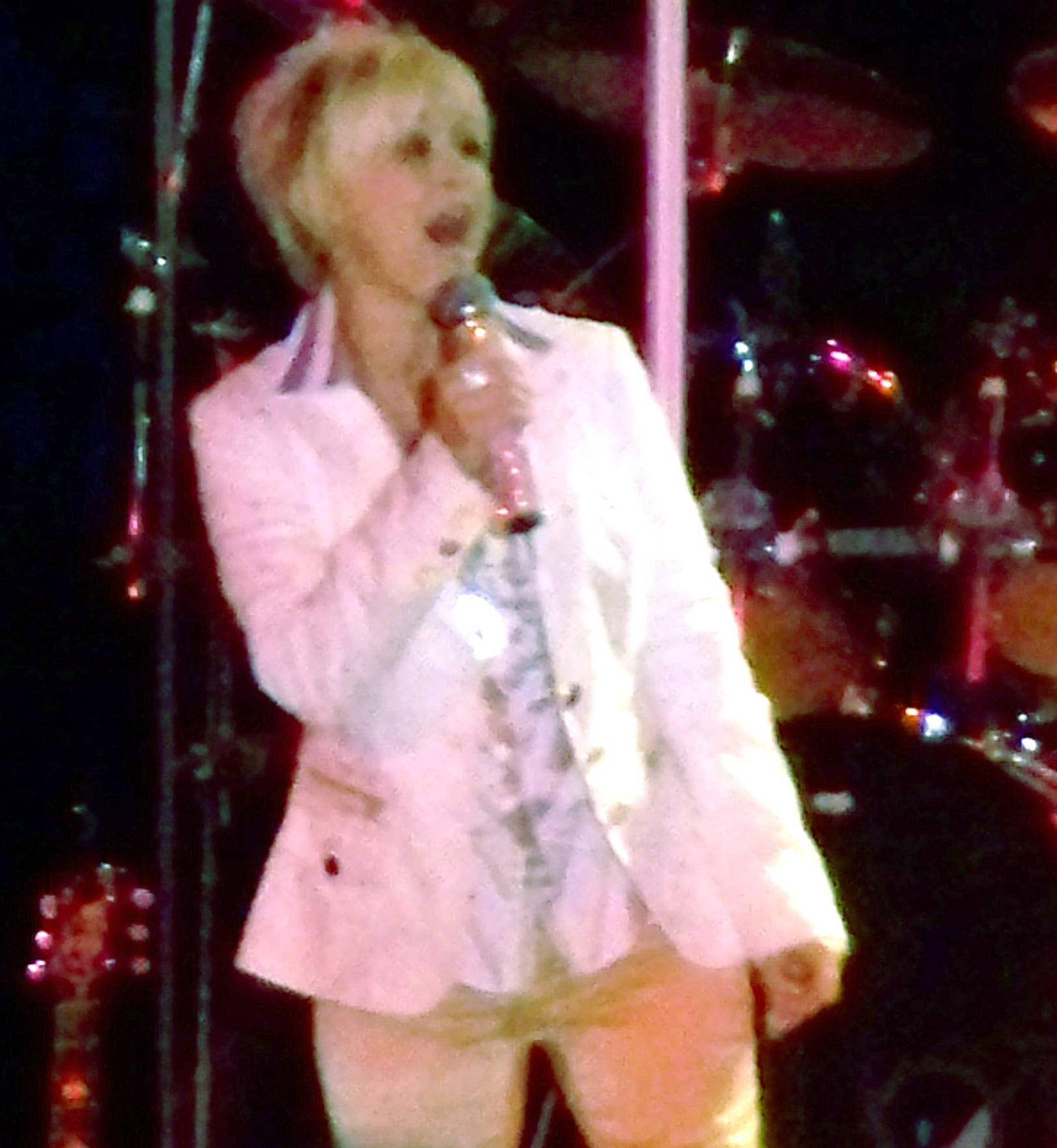
Lorrie Morgan reached number one for the first time in 1990. Her debut chart-topper came three months after her late husband, Keith Whitley, achieved his final number one.

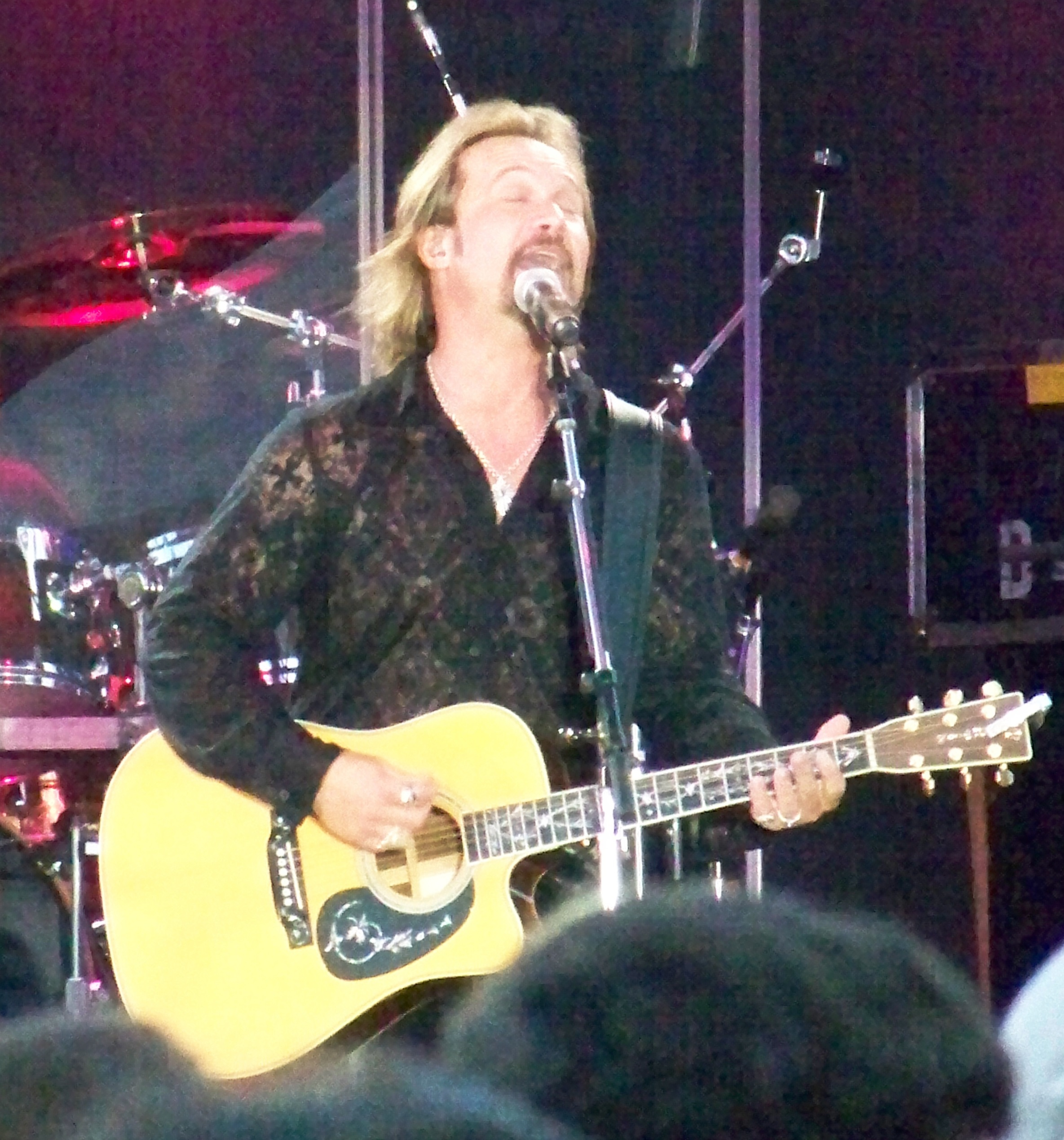
Travis Tritt also topped the chart for the first time in 1990.

Issue date	Title	Artist(s)	Ref.
January 6	"Who's Lonely Now"	Highway 101	
January 13	"It Ain't Nothin'"	Keith Whitley	
January 20	"Nobody's Home"	Clint Black	
January 27	"Nobody's Home"	Clint Black	
February 3	"Nobody's Home"	Clint Black	
February 10	"Southern Star"	Alabama	
February 17	"On Second Thought"	Eddie Rabbitt	
February 24	"On Second Thought"	Eddie Rabbitt	
March 3	"No Matter How High"	The Oak Ridge Boys	
March 10	"Chains"	Patty Loveless	
March 17	"Hard Rock Bottom of Your Heart"	Randy Travis	
March 24	"Hard Rock Bottom of Your Heart"	Randy Travis	
March 31	"Hard Rock Bottom of Your Heart"	Randy Travis	
April 7	"Hard Rock Bottom of Your Heart"	Randy Travis	
April 14	"Five Minutes"	Lorrie Morgan	
April 21	"Love on Arrival"	Dan Seals	
April 28	"Love on Arrival"	Dan Seals	
May 5	"Love on Arrival"	Dan Seals	
May 12	"Help Me Hold On"	Travis Tritt	
May 19	"Walkin' Away"	Clint Black	
May 26	"Walkin' Away"	Clint Black	
June 2	"I've Cried My Last Tear for You"	Ricky Van Shelton	
June 9	"Love Without End, Amen"	George Strait	
June 16	"Love Without End, Amen"	George Strait	
June 23	"Love Without End, Amen"	George Strait	
June 30	"Love Without End, Amen"	George Strait	
July 7	"Love Without End, Amen"	George Strait	
July 14	"The Dance"	Garth Brooks	
July 21	"The Dance"	Garth Brooks	
July 28	"The Dance"	Garth Brooks	
August 4	"Good Times"	Dan Seals	
August 11	"Good Times"	Dan Seals	
August 18	"Next to You, Next to Me"	Shenandoah	
August 25	"Next to You, Next to Me"	Shenandoah	
September 1	"Next to You, Next to Me"	Shenandoah	
September 8	"Jukebox in My Mind"	Alabama	
September 15	"Jukebox in My Mind"	Alabama	
September 22	"Jukebox in My Mind"	Alabama	
September 29	"Jukebox in My Mind"	Alabama	
October 6	"Friends in Low Places"	Garth Brooks	
October 13	"Friends in Low Places"	Garth Brooks	
October 20	"Friends in Low Places"	Garth Brooks	
October 27	"Friends in Low Places"	Garth Brooks	
November 3	"You Lie"	Reba McEntire	
November 10	"Home"	Joe Diffie	
November 17	"You Really Had Me Going"	Holly Dunn	
November 24	"Come Next Monday"	K. T. Oslin	
December 1	"Come Next Monday"	K. T. Oslin	
December 8	"I've Come to Expect It from You"	George Strait	
December 15	"I've Come to Expect It from You"	George Strait	
December 22	"I've Come to Expect It from You"	George Strait	
December 29	"I've Come to Expect It from You"	George Strait	

== See also ==
- 1990 in music
- List of artists who reached number one on the U.S. country chart
