= We Tell Ourselves =

Single by Clint Black

from the album The Hard Way
- B-side: "There Never Was a Train"
- Released: June 22, 1992
- Genre: Country
- Length: 4:39
- Label: RCA Nashville
- Songwriters: Clint Black; Hayden Nicholas
- Producers: James Stroud; Clint Black

Clint Black singles chronology
"Where Are You Now" (1991)	"We Tell Ourselves" (1992)	"Burn One Down" (1992)

"We Tell Ourselves" is a song co-written and recorded by American country music artist Clint Black. It was released in June 1992 as the first single from Black's album The Hard Way. The song reached number 2 on the Billboard Hot Country Singles & Tracks chart in August 1992, behind "Boot Scootin' Boogie" by Brooks and Dunn and also number-one on the RPM Country Tracks chart in Canada. It was written by Black and Hayden Nicholas.

== Critical reception ==
Deborah Evans Price, of Billboard magazine reviewed the song favorably, saying that Black gives "an impassioned reading of these savvy, introspective lyrics about fooling yourself." She goes on to say that the tone of the production is "both imaginative and energetic."

== Music video ==
The music video was directed by Michael Patterson and Candace Reckinger and premiered in mid-1992.

== Chart performance ==
Chart (1992)	Peak position
Canada Country Singles (RPM)	1
US Hot Country Songs (Billboard)	2

=== Year-end charts ===
Chart (1992)	Position
Canada Country Tracks (RPM)	14
US Country Songs (Billboard)	5
