= One More Payment =

Single by Clint Black

from the album Put Yourself in My Shoes
- B-side: "You're Gonna Leave Me Again"
- Released: April 1991
- Genre: Country
- Length: 2:16
- Label: RCA Nashville
- Songwriters: Clint Black; Hayden Nicholas; Shake Russell
- Producer: James Stroud

Clint Black singles chronology
"Loving Blind" (1991)	"One More Payment" (1991)	"Where Are You Now" (1991)

"One More Payment" is a song co-written and recorded by American country music artist Clint Black. It was released in April 1991 as the third single from his (Clint Black) album Put Yourself in My Shoes. The song peaked at both number 7 on the U.S. Billboard Hot Country Singles & Tracks chart and the Canadian RPM Country Tracks chart. It was written by Black with Hayden Nicholas and Shake Russell.

== Critical reception ==
An uncredited review in Time called it "a classic hard-times complaint about the rent, the banker at the door, and a roof that is crumbling". The Orlando Sentinel called it "a humorous workingman's lament about such everyday woes as high rent and car trouble. The arrangement is high-siprited Texas swing, but the song has a dark undertone with double-edged lines such as 'Well, I haven't bought the farm yet, but I'm not that far behind.'" The song has a western swing accompaniment.

== Chart positions ==
Chart (1991)	Peak position
Canada Country Singles (RPM)	7
US Hot Country Songs (Billboard)	7

=== Year-end charts ===
Chart (1991)	Position
Canada Country Tracks (RPM)	74
US Country Songs (Billboard)	60
