= Put Yourself in My Shoes (song) =

Single by Clint Black

from the album Put Yourself in My Shoes
- B-side: "Live and Learn"
- Released: October 1990
- Genre: Country
- Length: 3:16
- Label: RCA Nashville
- Songwriters: Clint Black; Hayden Nicholas; Shake Russell
- Producer: James Stroud

Clint Black singles chronology
"Nothing's News" (1990)	"Put Yourself in My Shoes" (1990)	"Loving Blind" (1991)

"Put Yourself in My Shoes" is a song co-written and recorded by American country music singer Clint Black. It was released in October 1990 as the lead single and title track to his second album Put Yourself in My Shoes. The song made its chart debut in October 1990 and peaked at number 4 on Hot Country Singles & Tracks by year's end. In Canada, it peaked at number 3 on the RPM country music charts dated for December 15, 1990. It was written by Black with Hayden Nicholas and Shake Russell.

== Music video ==
The music video was directed by Dean Lent, and premiered in October 1990. It features Black and his band performing the song at a barber shop.

== Chart positions ==
Chart (1990)	Peak position
Canada Country Singles (RPM)	3
US Hot Country Songs (Billboard)	4

=== Year-end charts ===
Chart (1990)	Position
Canada Country Tracks (RPM)	93

Chart (1991)	Position
US Country Songs (Billboard)	69
