= Burn One Down =

Single by Clint Black

from the album The Hard Way
- B-side: "Wake Up Yesterday"
- Released: September 1992
- Genre: Neotraditional country
- Length: 3:49
- Label: RCA Nashville
- Songwriters: Clint Black; Hayden Nicholas; Frankie Miller
- Producers: James Stroud; Clint Black

Clint Black singles chronology
"We Tell Ourselves" (1992)	"Burn One Down" (1992)	"When My Ship Comes In" (1993)

"Burn One Down" is a song co-written and recorded by American country music singer Clint Black. It was released in October 1992 as the second single from the album The Hard Way. The song made its chart debut in September 1992 and peaked at number 4 on the U.S. Billboard Hot Country Singles & Tracks chart. It reached number 2 on the Canadian RPM Country Tracks chart. The song was written by Black with Hayden Nicholas and Frankie Miller.

== Chart positions ==
Chart (1992)	Peak position
Canada Country Singles (RPM)	2
US Hot Country Songs (Billboard)	4

=== Year-end charts ===
Chart (1992)	Position
Canada Country Tracks (RPM)	68
