= The Hard Way (Clint Black album) =

Studio album by Clint Black
- Released: July 14, 1992
- Recorded: 1991–1992
- Studio: Studio Sound (Burbank, California); Moonee Ponds (Los Angeles); Eleven Eleven, Mesa (Nashville)
- Genre: Neotraditional country
- Length: 34:09
- Label: RCA Nashville
- Producer: James Stroud, Clint Black

Clint Black chronology
Put Yourself in My Shoes (1990)	The Hard Way (1992)	No Time to Kill (1993)

Singles from The Hard Way
- 1. "We Tell Ourselves" Released: June 22, 1992; 2. "Burn One Down" Released: October 1992; 3. "When My Ship Comes In" Released: January 11, 1993

Professional ratings
Review scores
Source	Rating
AllMusic	4.5/5 stars
Chicago Tribune	3.5/4 stars
Entertainment Weekly	B−
Los Angeles Times	3/4 stars
Q	3/5 stars
Robert Christgau	C

The Hard Way is the third studio album by American country music singer Clint Black. It includes the Billboard Hot Country Singles & Tracks top-ten hits "We Tell Ourselves"[#2], "Burn One Down"[#4], and the number-one hit "When My Ship Comes In". Released on July 14, 1992, it was co-produced by Black and James Stroud. While not as commercially successful as his first two albums, The Hard Way was certified platinum by the RIAA.

== Musical style and composition ==
The Hard Way has been described as a neotraditional country album with elements of pop compared to 1970s singer-songwriters such as Jimmy Buffett, James Taylor, and Dan Fogelberg.

== Track listing ==
All tracks are written by Clint Black and Hayden Nicholas except where noted.

No.	Title	Writer(s)	Length
1.	"We Tell Ourselves"		4:39
2.	"The Hard Way"		3:22
3.	"Something to Cry About"		3:55
4.	"Buying Time"		3:36
5.	"When My Ship Comes In"		3:33
6.	"A Woman Has Her Way"	Black, David Bellamy, Jerry Lynn Williams	2:51
7.	"There Never Was a Train" (omitted from cassette version)		2:42
8.	"The Good Old Days"		2:29
9.	"Burn One Down"	Black, Nicholas, Frankie Miller	3:51
10.	"Wake Up Yesterday"		3:43

== Personnel ==
=== Band ===
- Eddie Bayers — drums
- Clint Black — harmonica, electric guitar, acoustic guitar, lead vocals, background vocals
- Larry Byrom — acoustic guitar
- Lenny Castro — percussion
- Eric Darken — percussion
- Jerry Douglas — Dobro
- Sonny Garrish — steel guitar
- Dick Gay — drums
- Rob Hajacos — fiddle
- Dann Huff — electric guitar
- Jeff Huskins — fiddle
- Jana King — background vocals
- Liana Manis — background vocals
- Hayden Nicholas — electric guitar, electric sitar
- Mark O'Connor — fiddle
- Jeff Peterson — steel guitar
- Don Potter — acoustic guitar
- Matt Rollings — piano
- Leland Sklar — bass guitar
- Jake Willemain — bass guitar
- Dennis Wilson — background vocals
- Curtis Young — background vocals
- Martin Young — acoustic guitar
- Reggie Young — electric guitar

=== Production ===
- Clint Black — producer
- James Stroud — producer
- Lynn Peterzell — engineer

== Chart performance ==
=== Album ===
Chart (1992)	Peak position
U.S. Billboard Top Country Albums	2
U.S. Billboard 200	8
Canadian RPM Country Albums	3
Canadian RPM Top Albums	47

=== Singles ===
Year	Single	Peak positions	
Year	Single	US Country	CAN Country
1992	"We Tell Ourselves"	2	1
1992	"Burn One Down"	4	2
1993	"When My Ship Comes In"	1	1
