= When My Ship Comes In (song) =

Single by Clint Black

from the album The Hard Way
- B-side: "Buying Time"
- Released: January 11, 1993
- Recorded: 1992
- Genre: Country
- Length: 3:33
- Label: RCA Nashville 62429
- Songwriters: Clint Black, Hayden Nicholas
- Producers: James Stroud, Clint Black

Clint Black singles chronology
| "Burn One Down" (1992) | "When My Ship Comes In" (1993) | "A Bad Goodbye" (1993) |

"When My Ship Comes In" is a song co-written and recorded by American country music artist Clint Black. It was released in January 1993 as the third and final single from his album The Hard Way. It reached number one in both the United States and Canada. The song was written by Black and Hayden Nicholas.

== Music video ==
The music video was directed by Steven Goldmann, and premiered in early 1993.

== Chart positions ==
"When My Ship Comes In" debuted on the U.S. Billboard Hot Country Singles & Tracks for the week of January 16, 1993.

| Chart (1993) | Peak position |
|---|---|
| Canada Country Singles (RPM) | 1 |
| US Hot Country Songs (Billboard) | 1 |

=== Year-end charts ===
| Chart (1993) | Position |
|---|---|
| Canada Country Tracks (RPM) | 32 |
| US Country Songs (Billboard) | 41 |
