= Spend My Time =

Studio album by Clint Black
- Released: March 2, 2004
- Recorded: Ocean Way (Nashville, Tennessee)
- Genre: Country
- Length: 52:51
- Label: Equity
- Producer: Clint Black

Clint Black chronology
| Greatest Hits II (2001) | Spend My Time (2004) | Christmas with You (2004) |

Singles from Spend My Time
- 1. "Spend My Time" Released: October 20, 2003; 2. "The Boogie Man" Released: April 12, 2004; 3. "My Imagination" Released: June 28, 2004

Professional ratings
Review scores
| Source | Rating |
|---|---|
| About.com | 4/5 stars |
| Allmusic | 2.5/5 stars |
| Entertainment Weekly | B |
| People | 3.5/4 stars |
| USA Today | 2/4 stars |

Spend My Time is the ninth studio album by American country music singer Clint Black, released on March 2, 2004. It is his first since leaving RCA Nashville and creating his own record label, Equity Music Group. It includes the singles "Spend My Time", "The Boogie Man" and "My Imagination".

He worked on it intermittently for over four years, during which time he moved to Nashville and built a home recording studio. "I ended up with an abundance of material, which in a way made it more difficult. I had to determine which of these songs would make the best album."

== Track listing ==
All songs written by Clint Black and Hayden Nicholas except where noted.

| No. | Title | Writer(s) | Length |
|---|---|---|---|
| 1. | "Spend My Time" | | 4:06 |
| 2. | "We All Fall Down" | Black, Matt Rollings | 5:35 |
| 3. | "My Imagination" | Black, Rollings | 3:50 |
| 4. | "She's Leavin'" | Black | 3:45 |
| 5. | "Everything I Need" | | 4:14 |
| 6. | "What Ever Happened" | | 4:13 |
| 7. | "A Mind To" | | 4:54 |
| 8. | "Just Like You and Me" | Black, Steve Dorff | 3:44 |
| 9. | "The Boogie Man" | Black, Will Jennings | 3:52 |
| 10. | "Someone Else's Tears" | Black, Gerry House | 3:26 |
| 11. | "Haywire" | | 6:00 |
| 12. | "A Lover's Clown" | Black, Steve Wariner | 5:12 |

== Personnel ==
Band

- Clint Black — harmonica, electric guitar, lead vocals, background vocals, bass harmonica
- Eddie Bayers — drums
- Lenny Castro — percussion
- Lisa Cochran — background vocals
- Eric Darken — percussion
- Jerry Douglas — Dobro
- Stuart Duncan — fiddle
- Paul Franklin — steel guitar
- Sonny Garrish — steel guitar
- Wes Hightower — background vocals
- Abraham Laboriel — bass
- Brent Mason — electric guitar
- Hayden Nicholas — electric guitar, slide guitar
- Dean Parks — banjo, resonator guitar
- Steve Real — background vocals
- John Robinson — drums
- Matt Rollings — Hammond organ, Wurlitzer, grand piano
- John Wesley Ryles — background vocals
- Russell Terrell — background vocals
- Steve Wariner — classical guitar
- Biff Watson — acoustic guitar
- Glenn Worf — bass
- Jonathan Yudkin — fiddle

Production

- Clint Black — producer, engineer
- Zack Berry — production coordinator
- David Bryant — assistant
- Ricky Cobble — mixing, assistant
- Wil Donovan — assistant
- Steve Dorff — arranger
- Buford Jones — crew
- Julian King — engineer, mixing
- Steve Lockhart — crew
- Jack Murray — crew
- Charles Paakkari — assistant
- Ray Rogers — technical support
- Elliot Scheiner — engineer
- Dara Whitehead — crew
- Hank Williams — mastering

== Chart performance ==
=== Weekly charts ===
| Chart (2004) | Peak position |
|---|---|
| US Billboard 200 | 27 |
| US Top Country Albums (Billboard) | 3 |
| US Independent Albums (Billboard) | 1 |

=== Year-end charts ===
| Chart (2004) | Position |
|---|---|
| US Top Country Albums (Billboard) | 71 |

=== Singles ===
| Year | Single | Peak positions | |
| Year | Single | US Country | US |
|---|---|---|---|
| 2003 | "Spend My Time" | 16 | 102 |
| 2004 | "The Boogie Man" | 51 | — |
| 2004 | "My Imagination" | 42 | — |
