= On Purpose (album) =

Studio album by Clint Black
- Released: September 25, 2015
- Genre: Country
- Length: 52:00
- Labels: Thirty Tigers; Black Top Records
- Producer: Clint Black

Clint Black chronology
When I Said I Do (2013)	On Purpose (2015)	Still Killin' Time (2019)

On Purpose is the twelfth studio album by American country music artist Clint Black. It was released on September 25, 2015 via Thirty Tigers and Black Top Records. Black wrote all of the album's fourteen tracks. The album was produced by Black.

== Track listing ==
No.	Title	Writer(s)	Length
1.	"Time for That"	Clint Black, Frank Rogers	3:30
2.	"Better and Worse"	Black, Rogers	2:42
3.	"Summertime Song"	Black	4:30
4.	"One Way to Live"	Black, Steve Wariner	4:40
5.	"Doing It Now for Love"	Black, Hayden Nicholas	4:04
6.	"You Still Get to Me" (duet with Lisa Hartman Black)	Black, Victoria Shaw	4:01
7.	"Right on Time"	Black, Wariner	4:11
8.	"Still Calling It News"	Black, Nicholas	3:40
9.	"Making You Smile"	Black	2:54
10.	"Stay Gone"	Black, Phil O'Donnell	3:32
11.	"Breathing Air"	Black, Rogers	3:18
12.	"Beer" (featuring Big & Rich)	Black, Bill Anderson, Bob DiPiero	3:41
13.	"The Trouble"	Black	3:22
14.	"The Last Day"	Black, Nicholas	3:48

== Personnel ==
- Clint Black - lead vocals
- Lisa Hartman Black - duet vocals on track 6
- Big & Rich - guest vocals on track 12
- Dane Bryant - piano
- Jimmy Carter - bass
- Perry Coleman - backing vocals
- Eric Darken - percussion
- Glen Duncan - fiddle
- Stuart Duncan - fiddle
- John Ferarro - drums
- Shannon Forrest - drums
- Larry Franklin - fiddle, mandolin
- Paul Franklin - pedal steel guitar
- Tania Hancheroff - backing vocals
- Wes Hightower - backing vocals
- Victor Indrizzo - drums
- Los Angeles Orchestra
- B. James Lowry - acoustic guitar
- Brent Mason - electric guitar
- Gordon Mote - piano
- Hayden Nicholas - slide guitar, electric guitar
- Dean Parks - acoustic guitar, electric guitar
- Michael Rhodes - bass
- John Robinson - drums
- Matt Rollings - keyboards
- Dwain Rowe - keyboards
- Leland Sklar - bass
- Neil Stubenhaus - bass
- Bryan Sutton - mandolin
- Russell Terrell - backing vocals
- Ilya Toshinsky - acoustic guitar, banjo
- Biff Watson - acoustic guitar
- Jake Willemain - bass
- Lonnie Wilson - drums

== Charts ==
Chart (2015)	Peak position
US Top Country Albums (Billboard)	13
