= Where Are You Now (Clint Black song) =

Single by Clint Black

from the album Put Yourself in My Shoes
- B-side: "Muddy Water"
- Released: July 22, 1991
- Genre: Country
- Length: 3:09
- Label: RCA Nashville
- Songwriters: Clint Black; Hayden Nicholas
- Producer: James Stroud

Clint Black singles chronology
"One More Payment" (1991)	"Where Are You Now" (1991)	"We Tell Ourselves" (1992)

"Where Are You Now" is a song co-written and recorded by American country music artist Clint Black. It was released in July 1991 as the fourth and final single from his album Put Yourself in My Shoes. The song reached number-one on the U.S. Billboard Hot Country Singles & Tracks charts that year, and was his sixth chart-topper. It also reached number-one on the Canadian RPM Country Tracks chart. It was written by Black and Hayden Nicholas.

It received a nomination for Single Record of the Year by the Academy of Country Music Awards, losing to Alan Jackson's "Don't Rock the Jukebox."

== Chart performance ==
Chart (1991)	Peak position
Canada Country Singles (RPM)	1
US Hot Country Songs (Billboard)	1

=== Year-end charts ===
Chart (1991)	Position
Canada Country Tracks (RPM)	28
US Country Songs (Billboard)	26
