= Nothing's News =

Single by Clint Black

from the album Killin' Time
- B-side: "Live and Learn"
- Released: June 18, 1990
- Genre: Country
- Length: 3:02
- Label: RCA Nashville 2596
- Songwriter: Clint Black
- Producers: James Stroud & Mark Wright

Clint Black singles chronology
"Walkin' Away" (1990)	"Nothing's News" (1990)	"Put Yourself in My Shoes" (1990)

"Nothing's News" is a song written and recorded by American country music artist Clint Black. It was released in June 1990 as the fifth and final single from his debut album Killin' Time. It was his first single not to chart at number 1 on the Billboard Hot Country Singles & Tracks chart but it did reach number 1 on The Canadian RPM country Tracks chart.

== Content ==
The song is about getting together with good friends at the bar and thinking about the times when life was better.

== Chart performance ==
"Nothing's News" would only reach number 3 on the Hot Country Songs chart. It became his fifth consecutive number one hit on the Canadian RPM charts where it spent one week at number 1 beginning September 15, 1990.

Chart (1990)	Peak position
Canada Country Singles (RPM)	1
US Hot Country Songs (Billboard)	3

=== Year-end charts ===
Chart (1990)	Position
Canada Country Tracks (RPM)	24
US Country Songs (Billboard)	24
