= Loving Blind =

Single by Clint Black

from the album Put Yourself in My Shoes
- B-side: "Muddy Water"
- Released: January 14, 1991
- Genre: Country
- Length: 3:57
- Label: RCA Nashville 2749
- Songwriter: Clint Black
- Producer: James Stroud

Clint Black singles chronology
"Put Yourself in My Shoes" (1990)	"Loving Blind" (1991)	"One More Payment" (1991)

"Loving Blind" is a song written and recorded by American country music artist Clint Black. It was released in January 1991 as the second single from his album Put Yourself in My Shoes. It was his seventh single overall and it became his fifth single to reach number one on both the Billboard Hot Country Singles & Tracks and the Canadian RPM country Tracks chart.

== Music video ==
The music video was directed by Bill Young and premiered in early 1991.

== Chart performance ==
"Loving Blind" spent two weeks at number 1 on the Hot Country Songs chart beginning for the week of March 23, 1991. It spent the week beginning April 6, 1991, at number 1 on the Canadian RPM charts.

Chart (1991)	Peak position
Canada Country Singles (RPM)	1
US Hot Country Songs (Billboard)	1

=== Year-end charts ===
Chart (1991)	Position
Canada Country Tracks (RPM)	11
US Country Songs (Billboard)	14
