= Put Yourself in My Shoes =

Studio album by Clint Black
- Released: November 27, 1990
- Recorded: 1989
- Studio: Digital Services (Houston, Texas); Masterfonics (Nashville, Tennessee); Westlake (Los Angeles, California)
- Genre: Neotraditional country; honky-tonk
- Length: 30:39
- Label: RCA Nashville
- Producer: James Stroud

Clint Black chronology
Killin' Time (1989)	Put Yourself in My Shoes (1990)	The Hard Way (1992)

Singles from Put Yourself in My Shoes
- 1. "Put Yourself in My Shoes" Released: October 1990; 2. "Loving Blind" Released: January 14, 1991; 3. "One More Payment" Released: April 1991; 4. "Where Are You Now" Released: July 22, 1991

Professional ratings
Review scores
Source	Rating
Allmusic	3/5 stars
Chicago Tribune	3.5/4 stars
Entertainment Weekly	A
Los Angeles Times	2.5/4 stars
Rolling Stone	4/5 stars

Put Yourself in My Shoes is the second studio album by American country music singer-songwriter Clint Black, released on November 27, 1990. As with Black's debut album Killin' Time, the album is currently certified triple platinum by the RIAA. All four singles from the album produced huge hits for Black on the Billboard Hot Country Singles & Tracks charts: "Loving Blind" and "Where Are You Now" both at Number One; the title track at #4; and "One More Payment" at #7. "This Nightlife" also charted at #61 from unsolicited airplay.

== Musical style and composition ==
Put Yourself in My Shoes has been described musically as neotraditional country and honky-tonk, continuing the traditional country sounds of Black's debut album Killin' Time.

== Track listing ==
All tracks are written by Clint Black and Hayden Nicholas except where noted.

No.	Title	Writer(s)	Length
1.	"Put Yourself in My Shoes"	Black, Nicholas, Shake Russell	3:15
2.	"The Gulf of Mexico"		2:42
3.	"One More Payment"	Black, Nicholas, Russell	2:16
4.	"Where Are You Now"		3:09
5.	"The Old Man"		3:02
6.	"This Nightlife"		3:08
7.	"Loving Blind"	Black	3:57
8.	"Muddy Water" (Omitted from cassette version)		2:30
9.	"A Heart Like Mine"		3:03
10.	"The Goodnight-Loving"		3:37

== Personnel ==
=== Clint Black's band ===
- Clint Black – acoustic guitar and electric guitars, harmonica, lead vocals
- Dick Gay – drums and percussion
- Jeff Huskins – fiddle, keyboards, backing vocals
- Hayden Nicholas – acoustic guitar, electric guitar, backing vocals
- Jeff Peterson – pedal steel guitar, resonator guitar, backing vocals
- Jake Willemain – bass guitar, backing vocals
- Martin Young – acoustic guitar, backing vocals

=== Additional musicians ===
- Michael Black – backing vocals
- Jana King – backing vocals
- Randy McCormick – backing vocals
- Brent Rowan – electric guitar
- Curtis Young – backing vocals

== Chart performance ==
=== Weekly charts ===
Chart (1990)	Peak position
US Billboard 200	18
US Top Country Albums (Billboard)	1

=== Year-end charts ===
Chart (1991)	Position
US Billboard 200	19
US Top Country Albums (Billboard)	3

=== Singles ===
Year	Single	Peak positions	
Year	Single	US Country	CAN Country
1990	"Put Yourself in My Shoes"	4	3
1991	"Loving Blind"	1	1
1991	"One More Payment"	7	7
1991	"Where Are You Now"	1	1

=== Other charted songs ===
Year	Single	Peak positions
Year	Single	US Country
1991	"This Nightlife"	61
