= Walkin' Away (Clint Black song) =

Single by Clint Black

from the album Killin' Time
- B-side: "Straight from the Factory"
- Released: February 19, 1990
- Genre: Country
- Length: 2:47
- Label: RCA Nashville 2520
- Songwriters: Clint Black, Hayden Nicholas, Dick Gay
- Producers: James Stroud, Mark Wright

Clint Black singles chronology
"Nobody's Home" (1989)	"Walkin' Away" (1990)	"Nothing's News" (1990)

"Walkin' Away" is a song by American country music artist Clint Black. It was written Black, Hayden Nicholas, Black's electric guitarist and Dick Gay, his drummer. It was released in February 1990 as the fourth single from his album, Killin' Time. The song was his fourth consecutive number-one hit on both the Billboard Hot Country Singles & Tracks chart and the Canadian RPM Country Tracks chart.

== Music video ==
The music video, directed by Jim May and produced by Mary Matthews, features people on a merry go round with Clint singing in the shadows.

== Chart performance ==
"Walkin' Away" spent two consecutive weeks at number 1 on the Billboard Hot Country Songs chart beginning May 19, 1990. It spent the next two weeks at number 1 on the Canadian RPM charts.

Chart (1990)	Peak position
Canada Country Singles (RPM)	1
US Hot Country Songs (Billboard)	1

=== Year-end charts ===
Chart (1990)	Position
Canada Country Tracks (RPM)	3
US Country Songs (Billboard)	5
