= No Holdin' Back =

Studio album by Randy Travis
- Released: September 26, 1989
- Genre: Country
- Length: 31:52
- Label: Warner
- Producer: Kyle Lehning: "It's Just a Matter of Time" produced by Richard Perry

Randy Travis chronology
An Old Time Christmas (1989)	No Holdin' Back (1989)	Heroes & Friends (1990)

Singles from No Holdin' Back
- 1. "It's Just a Matter of Time" Released: September 11, 1989; 2. "Hard Rock Bottom of Your Heart" Released: January 22, 1990; 3. "He Walked on Water" Released: April 30, 1990

Professional ratings
Review scores
Source	Rating
AllMusic	4/5 stars
Chicago Tribune	3/4 stars
Robert Christgau	B+
Los Angeles Times	2.5/5 stars
Q	4/5 stars

No Holdin' Back is the fifth studio album by American country music artist Randy Travis. It was released on September 26, 1989, by Warner Records. Three singles were released from it, all of which charted on the Hot Country Songs charts: the Number One hits "It's Just a Matter of Time" and "Hard Rock Bottom of Your Heart", as well as the No. 2 hit "He Walked on Water". "It's Just a Matter of Time" was previously a Number One hit for Brook Benton in 1959 on the R&B charts, and for Sonny James in 1970 on the country charts. Glen Campbell also had a No. 7-peaking rendition of the song in 1986.

The track "Somewhere in My Broken Heart" was co-written by Billy Dean, who would later cut it for his 1990 album Young Man and release it as that album's third single. Also included is a cover of "Singing the Blues", a song originally recorded by Marty Robbins.

== Track listing ==
No.	Title	Writer(s)	Length
1.	"Mining for Coal"	Matraca Berg, Ronnie Samoset	3:08
2.	"Singing the Blues"	Melvin Endsley	2:19
3.	"When Your World Was Turning for Me"	Dallas Frazier, A.L. "Doodle" Owens	2:40
4.	"He Walked on Water"	Allen Shamblin	3:28
5.	"No Stoppin' Us Now"	Randy Travis	3:05
6.	"It's Just a Matter of Time"	Brook Benton, Belford Hendricks, Clyde Otis	3:59
7.	"Card Carryin' Fool"	Byron Hill, Tim Bays	2:27
8.	"Somewhere in My Broken Heart"	Billy Dean, Richard Leigh	3:16
9.	"Hard Rock Bottom of Your Heart"	Hugh Prestwood	4:06
10.	"Have a Nice Rest of Your Life"	Verlon Thompson, Mark D. Sanders	3:24

== Personnel ==
- Eddie Bayers - drums on "No Stoppin' Us Now"
- Matraca Berg - background vocals
- Dennis Burnside - piano
- Larry Byrom - acoustic guitar
- Mark Casstevens - acoustic guitar
- Carol Chase - background vocals
- Doug Clements - background vocals
- Jerry Douglas - Dobro
- Béla Fleck - banjo on "Hard Rock Bottom of Your Heart"
- Steve Gibson - electric guitar, 12-string electric guitar
- Doyle Grisham - steel guitar
- Sherilyn Huffman - background vocals
- David Hungate - bass guitar
- John Barlow Jarvis - piano
- Kirk "Jelly Roll" Johnson - harmonica on "He Walked on Water"
- Wendy Suits Johnson - background vocals
- Paul Leim - drums
- Steve Lindsey - synthesizer and Kurzweil Synthesizer on "It's Just a Matter of Time"
- Larrie Londin - drums
- Terry McMillan - harmonica, percussion
- Brent Mason - electric guitar
- Louis Dean Nunley - background vocals
- Mark O'Connor - fiddle
- Dean Parks - electric guitar solo on "It's Just a Matter of Time"
- Richard Perry - bass vocals on "It's Just a Matter of Time"
- Tom Roady - percussion
- Hargus "Pig" Robbins - piano
- Lisa Silver - background vocals
- Randy Travis - acoustic guitar, lead vocals
- Dianne Vanette - background vocals
- Cindy Richardson-Walker - background vocals
- Billy Joe Walker, Jr. - electric guitar
- Jack Williams - bass guitar
- Curtis Young - background vocals

== Charts ==
=== Weekly charts ===
Chart (1989)	Peak position
Canadian Albums (RPM)	55
US Billboard 200	33
US Top Country Albums (Billboard)	1

=== Year-end charts ===
Chart (1990)	Position
US Top Country Albums (Billboard)	2
Chart (1991)	Position
US Top Country Albums (Billboard)	41

== Certifications ==
Region	Certification	Certified units/sales
United States (RIAA)	2× Platinum	2,000,000^{^}
^{^} Shipments figures based on certification alone.
