= Daniele Alexander =

American country music singer (born 1954)

- Born: December 2, 1954 (age 71); Fort Worth, Texas, United States
- Genres: Country
- Occupation: Singer-songwriter
- Instruments: Vocals, piano
- Years active: 1986–1997
- Label: Mercury

Daniele Alexander (born December 2, 1954, in Fort Worth, Texas) is an American country music singer. She began her career as a teenager, performing jazz initially before moving to Las Vegas, Nevada to sing in casinos. She also charted in the Top 20 on the Billboard charts with the single "She's There", a single from her 1989 Mercury Records album First Move. In 1990, she was nominated for Top New Female Vocalist at the Academy of Country Music Awards, along with Jann Browne and Mary Chapin Carpenter, but lost to Carpenter. A second album, I Dream in Color, produced a duet with labelmate Butch Baker in "It Wasn't You, It Wasn't Me," the last chart single for either artist. Alexander exited Mercury in 1991, and later co-wrote two songs on Mila Mason's 1997 debut That's Enough of That.

== Discography ==
=== Albums ===
Title	Album details	Peak positions
Title	Album details	US Country
First Move	Release date: August 22, 1989; Label: PolyGram/Mercury Records	59
I Dream in Color	Release date: January 10, 1991; Label: PolyGram/Mercury Records	—
"—" denotes releases that did not chart

=== Singles ===
Year	Single	Peak chart positions		Album
Year	Single	US Country	CAN Country	Album
1989	"She's There"	19	—	First Move
1989	"Where Did the Moon Go Wrong"	53	60	First Move
1990	"You Called"	—	—	First Move
1990	"It Wasn't You, It Wasn't Me" (with Butch Baker)	55	—	I Dream in Color
1991	"I Know What I Do Know"	—	—	I Dream in Color
1991	"Who Can She Turn To"	—	—	I Dream in Color
"—" denotes releases that did not chart

=== Music videos ===
Year	Video	Director
1989	"She's There"	John Lloyd Miller
1989	"Where Did the Moon Go Wrong"	Marius Penczner
1990	"It Wasn't You, It Wasn't Me"	Tom Neff

== Awards and nominations ==
Year	Organization	Award	Nominee/Work	Result
1990	Academy of Country Music Awards	Top New Female Vocalist	Daniele Alexander	Nominated
