= She's There =

Single by Daniele Alexander

from the album First Move
- B-side: "Goodbye Me"
- Released: July 1989
- Genre: Country
- Length: 3:46
- Label: Mercury
- Songwriter(s): Daniele Alexander
- Producer(s): Harold Shedd

Daniele Alexander singles chronology
"She's There" (1989)	"Where Did the Moon Go Wrong" (1989)

"She's There" is a song written and recorded by American country music artist Daniele Alexander. It was released in July 1989 as the first single from her debut album First Move. The song peaked at No. 19 on the Billboard Hot Country Singles chart.

== Chart performance ==
Chart (1989)	Peak position
US Hot Country Songs (Billboard)	19
