= He Walked on Water =

"He Walked On Water"

Single by Randy Travis

from the album No Holdin' Back
- B-side: "Card Carrying Fool"
- Released: April 26, 1990
- Genre: Country
- Length: 3:28
- Label: Warner Bros. Nashville 19878
- Songwriter: Allen Shamblin
- Producer: Kyle Lehning

Randy Travis singles chronology
"Hard Rock Bottom of Your Heart" (1990)	"He Walked On Water" (1990)	"A Few Ole Country Boys" (1990)

"He Walked on Water" is a song written by Allen Shamblin, and recorded by American country music singer Randy Travis. It was released in April 1990 as the third single from the album No Holdin' Back. The song peaked at number 2 on the Billboard Hot Country Singles & Tracks (now Hot Country Songs) chart, and number 1 on Canada's RPM country chart.

== Content ==
The song is a ballad in which the narrator reminisces about his childhood admiration of his great-grandfather, a former cowboy whom he idolized. It was the first successful cut for Nashville songwriter Allen Shamblin, who told The Tennessean in 1990 that his maternal great-grandfather, "Poppy" Fugate, was the inspiration behind the song. Fugate had been a cowboy in the late 19th and early 20th centuries, and had told stories about this lifestyle to a young Shamblin. When Travis heard the song, he chose to record the song because it reminded him of his own grandfather.

"He Walked on Water" is composed in the key of D major. It has a 4/4 time signature and a moderate tempo of approximately 92 beats per minute. The song's verses follow the chord pattern of D-G-D-A-D-G-D-A-D.

== Music video ==
A music video was made for the song. It features Travis singing the song on the front porch outside of his house. The video was nominated for Video of the year at the 1991 TNN Music City News Country Awards (now known as the CMT Music Awards).

== Critical reception ==
Kimmy Wix of Cash Box magazine reviewed the single favorably, stating in her review that "Such a ballad, with detailed lyrics to which we can all relate, certainly works well with Travis. This cut[...]is no exception." Giving the song an "A", Country Universe writer Kevin John Coyne wrote, "Kudos to the songwriter, Allen Shamblin, for capturing something universal while writing about something so specific to one child’s memory. Our backgrounds couldn’t be more different, but our truths are the same." Thom Jurek of Allmusic gave the song a mixed review in his review of No Holdin' Back. He stated that the song "was a bad choice, though it sold well."

In 2012, Travis re-recorded the song as a duet with Kenny Chesney for the compilation album Anniversary Celebration.

== Chart positions ==
Chart (1990)	Peak position
Canada Country Singles (RPM)	1
US Hot Country Songs (Billboard)	2

=== Year-end charts ===
Chart (1990)	Position
Canada Country Tracks (RPM)	2
US Country Songs (Billboard)	23
