= A Better Man (Clint Black song) =

Single by Clint Black

from the album Killin' Time
- B-side: "Winding Down"
- Released: February 18, 1989 (U.S.)
- Recorded: November 1988
- Genre: Country
- Length: 3:04
- Label: RCA Nashville 8781
- Songwriters: Clint Black; Hayden Nicholas
- Producers: Mark Wright; James Stroud

Clint Black singles chronology
"A Better Man" (1989)	"Killin' Time" (1989)

"A Better Man" is a song by American country music artist Clint Black. It was released in February 1989 as his debut single, and was served as the first single from his debut album, Killin' Time. It was written by Black and Hayden Nicholas. When "A Better Man" went to No. 1 on the Billboard magazine Hot Country Singles chart on June 10, Black was the first artist since Freddy Fender to ascend to the top of the country chart with his first charted single. In addition, "A Better Man" was the No. 1 song of 1989 on the Hot Country Singles chart. The success of "A Better Man," along with the follow-up "Killin' Time," were instrumental in Black winning the Country Music Association's Horizon Award in 1989.

== Content ==
The song is a reflection on a relationship co-writer Black had recently ended with a girlfriend of seven years. He shared his dying romance story with friend Hayden Nicholas, who - after sharing an idea for the melody - came up with the hook line ("I'm leaving here a better man/For knowing you this way.").

== Music video ==
This was Clint Black's first music video; it was directed by Bill Young and premiered in early 1989. Much of the video is of Black driving down a little-used country road in a 1960 Ford F-100 pickup truck, reflecting on his now-failed relationship. Interspersed are clips of Black performing the song before people dancing to the song.

== Chart positions ==
Chart (1989)	Peak position
Canada Country Singles (RPM)	1
US Hot Country Songs (Billboard)	1

=== Year-end charts ===
Chart (1989)	Position
Canada Country Tracks (RPM)	4
US Country Songs (Billboard)	1

== Certifications ==
Certifications for A Better Man
Region	Certification	Certified units/sales
United States (RIAA)	Gold	500,000^{‡}
^{‡} Sales+streaming figures based on certification alone.
