= Killin' Time (Clint Black album) =

Studio album by Clint Black
- Released: May 2, 1989
- Recorded: 1988
- Studio: Digital Services (Houston, Texas); Eleven Eleven (Nashville, Tennessee); House of David (Nashville, Tennessee); Sound Stage (Nashville, Tennessee); Woodland (Nashville, Tennessee); Reflections (Nashville, Tennessee)
- Genre: Neotraditional country; Texas country; Western swing
- Length: 30:35
- Label: RCA Nashville
- Producer: James Stroud, Mark Wright

Clint Black chronology
Killin' Time (1989)	Put Yourself in My Shoes (1990)

Singles from Killin' Time
- 1. "A Better Man" Released: February 18, 1989; 2. "Killin' Time" Released: July 15, 1989; 3. "Nobody's Home" Released: October 1989; 4. "Walkin' Away" Released: February 19, 1990; 5. "Nothing's News" Released: June 18, 1990

Professional ratings
Review scores
Source	Rating
AllMusic	4.5/5 stars
Chicago Tribune	3.5/4 stars
Christgau's Record Guide	A−
The Encyclopedia of Popular Music	3/5 stars
Q	4/5 stars
Rolling Stone	4/5 stars

Killin' Time is the debut studio album by American country music singer-songwriter Clint Black. It was released on May 2, 1989, by RCA Nashville. The album, buoyed by the chart-topping success of its first four singles, was a huge hit upon its release, and established Black as one of the biggest new stars in country music. The album is currently certified triple platinum by the RIAA.

"A Better Man", "Nothing's News", "Walking Away", "Nobody's Home", and "Killin' Time" were all huge hit songs. All of these except "Nothing's News" reached Number One on the Billboard Hot Country Singles and Hot Country Singles & Tracks (now Hot Country Songs) chart, while "Nothing's News" reached No. 3. In addition, "A Better Man" and "Nobody's Home" were declared the Number One songs of 1989 and 1990, respectively, according to Billboard.

== Critical reception ==
The Los Angeles Times wrote that "Black has a winning vocal style that evokes a very young Merle Haggard at times, and musically he can Western swing just as hard as fellow Texan George Strait, which he proves on the delightful 'Straight From the Factory'."

== Musical style and composition ==
Killin' Time has been described musically as neotraditional country, Texas country, Western swing. It has been compared to the musical style of classic country music artists such as Merle Haggard and as neotraditional country contemporaries such as George Strait and Randy Travis.

== Track listing ==
All tracks are written by Clint Black, with additional co-writers as noted.

No.	Title	Writer(s)	Length
1.	"Straight From The Factory"	Hayden Nicholas	2:18
2.	"A Better Man"	Nicholas	3:03
3.	"Nobody's Home"		3:29
4.	"Walkin' Away"	Nicholas, Dick Gay	2:47
5.	"You're Gonna Leave Me Again"	Nicholas	3:43
6.	"I'll Be Gone" (Omitted from LP/Cassette version)	Nicholas	2:28
7.	"Nothing's News"		3:02
8.	"Winding Down"		3:38
9.	"Killin' Time" (Track 6 on LP/Cassette version)	Nicholas	2:48
10.	"Live and Learn"		3:14

== Personnel ==
=== Band ===
- Clint Black – acoustic guitar, harmonica, lead vocals, background vocals
- Dick Gay – drums
- Rob Hajacos – fiddle
- Jana King – background vocals
- Randy McCormick – keyboards
- Craig Morris – background vocals
- Hayden Nicholas – acoustic guitar, electric guitar, background vocals
- Mark O'Connor – fiddle
- John Permenter – fiddle
- Jeff Peterson – Dobro, steel guitar
- Jim Photoglo – background vocals
- Donna Rhodes – background vocals
- Brent Rowan – electric guitar
- Harry Stinson – background vocals
- Wendy Waldman – background vocals
- Jake Willemain – bass guitar
- Reggie Young – electric guitar

=== Production ===
- Milan Bogdan – editing
- Bill Ham – executive producer
- Steve Lindsey – production coordinator
- Glenn Meadows – mastering
- Lynn Peterzell – engineer, mixing
- Scott Poston – production coordinator
- James Stroud – producer
- Mark Wright – producer

== Chart positions ==
=== Weekly charts ===
Chart (1989–1990)	Peak position
Canadian Albums (RPM)	93
Canadian Country Albums (RPM)	6
US Billboard 200	31
US Top Country Albums (Billboard)	1

=== Year-end charts ===
Chart (1989)	Position
US Top Country Albums (Billboard)	16
Chart (1990)	Position
US Billboard 200	52
US Top Country Albums (Billboard)	1
Chart (1991)	Position
US Top Country Albums (Billboard)	6
Chart (1992)	Position
US Top Country Albums (Billboard)	50

=== Singles ===
Year	Single	Peak positions	
Year	Single	US Country	CAN Country
1989	"A Better Man"	1	1
1989	"Killin' Time"	1	1
1989	"Nobody's Home"	1	1
1990	"Walkin' Away"	1	1
1990	"Nothing's News"	3	1

== Certifications ==
Region	Certification	Certified units/sales
Canada (Music Canada)	Platinum	100,000^{^}
United States (RIAA)	3× Platinum	3,000,000^{^}
^{^} Shipments figures based on certification alone.
