= Killin' Time (Clint Black song) =

Single by Clint Black

from the album Killin' Time
- B-side: "I'll Be Gone"
- Released: July 15, 1989
- Recorded: 1988
- Genre: Neotraditional country
- Length: 2:47
- Label: RCA Nashville 8945
- Songwriters: Clint Black, Hayden Nicholas
- Producers: Mark Wright; James Stroud

Clint Black singles chronology
"A Better Man" (1989)	"Killin' Time" (1989)	"Nobody's Home" (1989)

"Killin' Time" is a song written by Hayden Nicholas and American country music artist Clint Black, and recorded by Black. It was released in July 1989 as the second single and title track from his debut album. The song was his second number-one hit on the U.S. Billboard magazine Hot Country Singles chart and the Canadian RPM Country Tracks chart. When Billboard published its year-end Hot Country Singles chart for 1989, "Killin' Time" was the No. 2 song of the year — one spot behind Black's "A Better Man." The successes of "A Better Man" and "Killin' Time" were instrumental in Black winning the Country Music Association's Horizon Award in 1989.

== Critical reception ==
In 2024, Rolling Stone ranked the song at #144 on its 200 Greatest Country Songs of All Time ranking.

== Music video ==
This was his second music video and was directed by Bill Young, and premiered in July 1989. It features Black singing the song at a bar named My Place (the actual name of the bar at the time of filming). He addresses a woman named Minnie in the opening (the name of the original owner of My Place). My Place located in Sealy, TX is now known as Saddleback Saloon. He was wearing a T-shirt that has Don't Mess with Texas written on it, and features him in another singing the song wearing a striped shirt. He puts the guitar down, and the video ends.

At 2:50 into, Clint's brother Brian Black makes a cameo dancing on the dance floor in front of Clint Black (in which viewers confused the guy on the dance floor as George Strait). Also making a cameo appearance in the video as an older Clint is Clint's brother Kevin Black.

== Chart positions ==
Chart (1989)	Peak position
Canada Country Singles (RPM)	1
US Hot Country Songs (Billboard)	1

=== Year-end charts ===
Chart (1989)	Position
Canada Country Tracks (RPM)	10
US Country Songs (Billboard)	2

== Certifications ==
Certifications for Killin' Time
Region	Certification	Certified units/sales
United States (RIAA)	Platinum	1,000,000^{‡}
^{‡} Sales+streaming figures based on certification alone.

== Sources ==
=== See also ===
- Roland, Tom, "The Billboard Book of Number One Country Hits." (Billboard Books, Watson-Guptill Publications, New York, 1991 (ISBN 0-82-307553-2))
