= Nobody's Home (Clint Black song) =

Single by Clint Black

from the album Killin' Time
- B-side: "Winding Down"
- Released: October 1989
- Recorded: 1988
- Genre: Country
- Length: 3:29
- Label: RCA Nashville 9078-7-R
- Songwriter: Clint Black
- Producers: James Stroud & Mark Wright

Clint Black singles chronology
"Killin' Time" (1989)	"Nobody's Home" (1989)	"Walkin' Away" (1990)

"Nobody's Home" is a song written and recorded by American country music artist Clint Black. It was released in October 1989 as the third single from his debut album Killin' Time. The song was his third consecutive number-one hit on the Billboard Hot Country Singles & Tracks chart and on the Canadian RPM Country Tracks chart. It was also Black's first single not to have an accompanying music video.

== Content ==
The song is a ballad about a man who becomes depressed and miserable after his former significant other abandoned him. Since the split, he has lived his life metaphorically as a zombie; he maintains the same routines in his life, but is not mentally the same person as he once was before the split.

== Chart performance ==
"Nobody's Home" spent three consecutive weeks at the top of the Hot Country Singles & Tracks chart beginning on the week of January 20, 1990. The song went on to be named the No. 1 song of 1990 in Billboard magazine's year-end issue.

Chart (1989–1990)	Peak position
Canada Country Singles (RPM)	1
US Hot Country Songs (Billboard)	1

=== Year-end charts ===
Chart (1990)	Position
Canada Country Tracks (RPM)	31
US Country Songs (Billboard)	1
