= Hard Rock Bottom of Your Heart =

"Hard Rock Bottom Of Your Heart"

Single by Randy Travis

from the album No Holdin' Back
- B-side: "When Your World Was Turning for Me"
- Released: January 1990 (U.S.)
- Recorded: 1989
- Genre: Country
- Length: 4:02
- Label: Warner Bros. Nashville
- Songwriter: Hugh Prestwood
- Producer: Kyle Lehning

Randy Travis singles chronology
"It's Just a Matter of Time" (1989)	"Hard Rock Bottom Of Your Heart" (1990)	"He Walked on Water" (1990)

"Hard Rock Bottom of Your Heart" is a song written by Hugh Prestwood, and recorded by American country music singer Randy Travis. It was released in January 1990 as the second single from the album No Holdin' Back.

== Content ==
"Hard Rock Bottom of Your Heart" is composed in the key of E major. It has a "moderately fast" tempo in cut time, and the opening uses a tresillo rhythm. Lyrically, it is about a man criticizing his wife and expressing his emotions after he is caught in an act of infidelity. During the chorus, he compares his emotions to "a stone you have picked up and thrown / to the hard rock bottom of your heart."

== Chart history ==
In March 1990, the song spent four weeks at No. 1 on the Billboard magazine Hot Country Singles & Tracks chart. In doing so, it became the first song to stay as long atop the chart in 12 years; the last to accomplish the feat was the 1978 song, "Mamas Don't Let Your Babies Grow Up to Be Cowboys" by Waylon Jennings and Willie Nelson.

Chart (1990)	Peak position
Canada Country Singles (RPM)	1
US Hot Country Songs (Billboard)	1

=== Year-end charts ===
Chart (1990)	Position
Canada Country Tracks (RPM)	1
US Country Songs (Billboard)	2
