= Clint Black =

American country musician (born 1962)

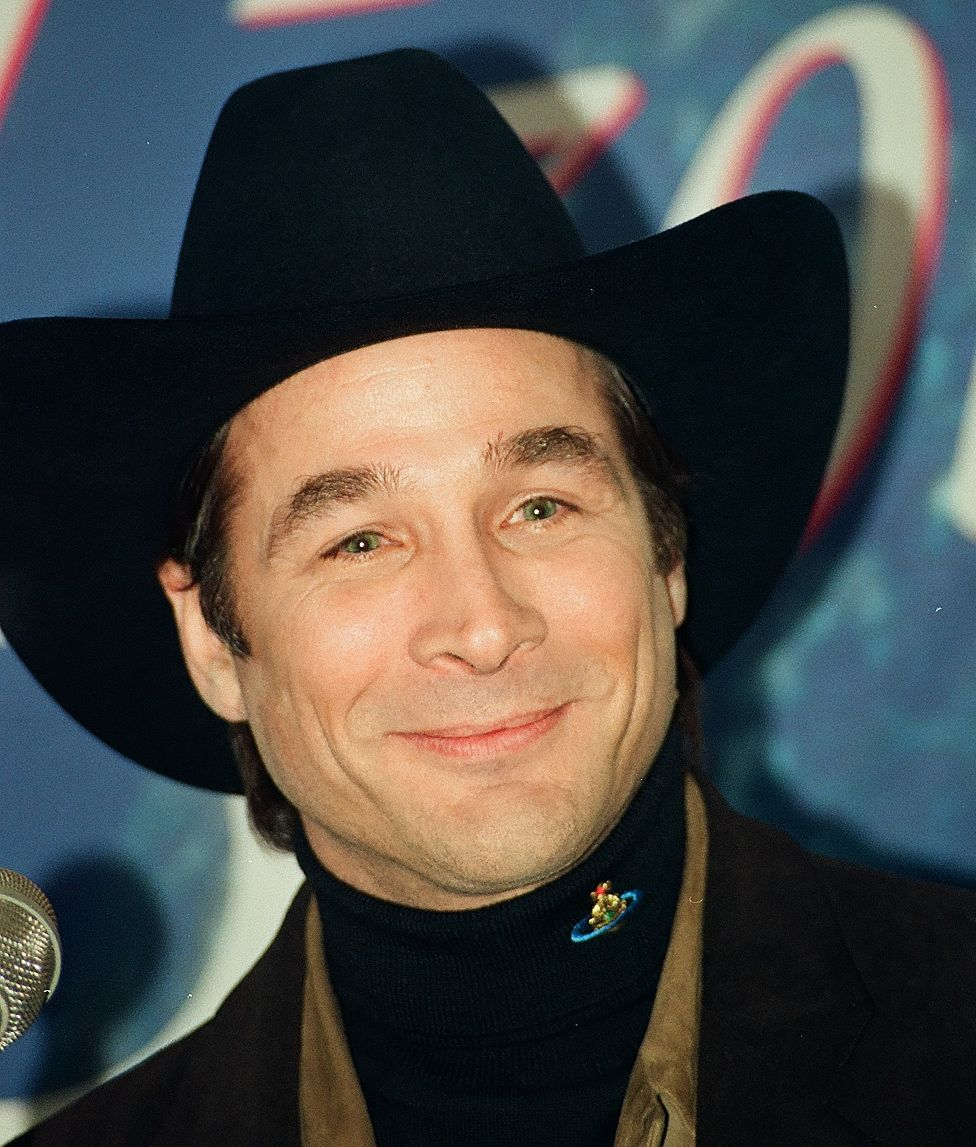
- Black in 2000

Background information
- Born: Clint Patrick Black; February 4, 1962 (age 64); Long Branch, New Jersey, U.S.
- Origin: Katy, Texas, U.S.
- Genre: Country
- Occupations: Singer; songwriter; musician; record producer; actor
- Instruments: Vocals; guitar; harmonica
- Years active: 1983–present
- Labels: RCA Nashville; Equity; Thirty Tigers
- Spouse: Lisa Hartman (m. 1991)
- Website: clintblack.com

Clint Patrick Black (born February 4, 1962) is an American country music singer, songwriter, musician, actor, and record producer. Signed to RCA Nashville in 1989, Black's debut album Killin' Time produced four straight number one singles on the US Billboard Hot Country Singles & Tracks charts. Although his momentum gradually slowed throughout the 1990s, Black consistently charted hit songs into the 2000s. He has had more than thirty singles on the US Billboard country charts, thirteen of which have reached number one, in addition to having released twelve studio albums and several compilation albums. In 2003, Black founded his own record label, Equity Music Group. Black has also ventured into acting, having made appearances in a 1993 episode of the TV series Wings and in the 1994 film Maverick, as well as a starring role in 1998's Still Holding On: The Legend of Cadillac Jack.

Black has been nominated for four Grammy Awards for best Country Male Vocal Performance (1990 – "Killin' Time", 1997 – "Like the Rain", 1998 – "Something That We Do", 1999 – "Nothin' but the Taillights"), he was also nominated for six Grammy Awards with one win in the category of Best Country Collaboration with Vocals – "Hold On Partner" in 1991 (w/ Roy Rogers), "A Bad Goodbye" in 1993 (w/ Wynonna), "Still Holding On" in 1997 (w/ Martina McBride), "Same Old Train" in 1998 which got the Grammy Award (with Joe Diffie, Merle Haggard, Emmylou Harris, Alison Krauss, Patty Loveless, Earl Scruggs, Ricky Skaggs, Marty Stuart, Pam Tillis, Randy Travis, Travis Tritt and Dwight Yoakam), "When I Said I Do" in 1999 (w/ wife Lisa Hartman Black), and "Hey Good Lookin'" in 2004 (Jimmy Buffett, Kenny Chesney, Alan Jackson, Toby Keith, and George Strait).

Black had numerous hit singles including "A Better Man," "Killin' Time," "Nobody's Home," "A Good Run of Bad Luck," and "Nothin' but the Taillights."

== Early life ==
Black was born in Long Branch, New Jersey, the youngest of four children of Ann (Scherma) and Gwin Augusta "G.A." Black, Jr., and lived in nearby Red Bank. His maternal great-grandfather was of Italian descent, with roots in Palermo, Sicily. The family moved back to Texas, where G.A. Black had been born and raised, before Clint was one year old. He was raised in Katy, Texas. Music was always present in the house. Black taught himself to play harmonica before he was 13, and at 14 wrote his first song. His father remarked that it was at that age that the parents "first noticed that he had a great voice". By 15, Black had learned to play guitar. As a teenager Black joined his elder brothers, Mark, Kevin and Brian, in their small band. On Saturday afternoons, the family would host backyard barbecues and invite the neighborhood to listen to the boys sing. Some weekends would attract up to 70 people. Black eventually dropped out of high school to play with his brothers, before becoming a solo act.

== Music career ==
=== 1983–1988: Early career ===
Black was initially drawn to a variety of musical genres. According to his father, he chose to focus on country music in the early 1980s, after singers George Strait and Reba McEntire moved the genre back toward the more traditional; in the style kept alive by George Jones and Merle Haggard. For six years, Black supported himself as a construction worker, bait cutter, and fishing guide, while singing at various lounges as a solo singer and guitarist. In 1987, at one of the gigs he met another guitarist, Hayden Nicholas. The two men connected musically and began a song writing partnership that would last decades. In the late 1980s, Black delivered a demo of their collaboration "Nobody's Home" to record promoter Sammy Alfano. Within two days of that delivery, Black was invited to a meeting with Bill Ham, who managed ZZ Top.

=== 1989–1991: Breakthrough ===
Black soon signed with RCA in October 1987, and at the time, RCA was considered one of the "most aggressive" labels in country music. His first album, Killin' Time, was released in 1989. Each song on the album was penned at least in part by Black; four of them were attributed solely to him, while the rest were collaborations with Nicholas. In a departure from most other country albums, Black used his road band instead of session musicians to record Killin' Time. The album was a critical and commercial success, reaching number one on the Billboard Country Albums chart and certified platinum in 1990. He made his debut in 1989 with the single, "A Better Man", which reached number one on the Billboard Hot Country Songs in early June. This marked the first time in 14 years that a debut single by a male artist had peaked at the top of the chart. In total, five singles off of his debut album reached number one, the first time any country artist had accomplished this feat. Black won the Country Music Association's Horizon Award for best newcomer in 1989. At the end of the year, his singles "A Better Man" and "Killin' Time" placed number one and number two on the year-end country singles charts. It had been 36 years since another artist had claimed both top spots in a single year. Looking back at the early stages of his career, Black recalled: "At one point, I knew I crossed this line out of obscurity and I felt like no matter what happened from that point on I would always be remembered for Killin' Time. There was this kind of mixed feeling of remorse and excitement."

In late 1990, the Los Angeles Times surveyed country music industry insiders to determine which acts could be expected to sell the most records over the next seven years. (Note: Seven years was the typical length of a recording contract.) Black placed second in the poll, two votes behind Garth Brooks. The survey results were surprising in that 10 of the top 20 artists named were relative newcomers to the industry; in the past, country music had been dominated by artists with several decades experience. The plethora of new acts confused some reviewers, however. Many reviewers lumped many of the new acts together; as Newsweek's David Gates wrote: "Good song, good voice, hot band: who cares which one it is this time?" Black soon became known as one of Nashville's "hat acts"; like other country artists such as Tracy Lawrence, Alan Jackson, and John Michael Montgomery, Black was a relative newcomer who wore a hat, and had "clean, neotraditional sound with pop appeal".

Killin' Time was certified platinum in 1990. Black's second album, Put Yourself in My Shoes, was released in November 1990. It reached number two on the country chart and was in the top 20 on the pop album charts. This success on the pop charts resulted from a change in the way Billboard calculated album sales; a new reliance on Nielsen SoundScan instead of information from selected record stores showed that sales of country albums had previously been under counted. The album did not meet with as much critical acclaim as his debut, but nonetheless still included several hit singles. He began touring with Alabama.

Black has been a member of the Grand Ole Opry since 1991.

=== 1992: Lawsuits and The Hard Way ===
In March 1992, Black sued his manager, Bill Ham, for breach of contract; Black sought $2 million in damages and requested that Ham return $4 million in royalties. Under the terms of their initial contract, Ham controlled all publishing royalties for any song that Black wrote or co-wrote for his first eight albums. Because Black wrote all of his own music, this amounted to a fee of 20 to 30 cents per album sold. Industry standards generally counseled songwriters to form their own publication companies, so they would be able to retain more of the royalties.

Ham promptly countersued, blaming the initial lawsuit on poor advice Black received from his new personal assistant, his mother-in-law Jonni Hartman. His lawyer told the press that "Mr. Ham invested $1 million of his own money in Clint Black's career at a time when nobody else would do so. For that commitment, Mr. Black should show a little gratitude and honor his contracts".

By mid-1992, Black's first two albums had sold a combined 5 million copies. The difficulties with Ham caused a delay in the release of Black's third album, The Hard Way, which was released on July 14. The album had been expected the year previously, and during the delay the country music scene changed. Both Alan Jackson and Travis Tritt achieved greater success, and Billy Ray Cyrus became a teen idol. The competition that Black faced was now much stiffer than with his earlier albums.

According to Black, he and producer James Stroud spent more time putting this album together than either of those preceding and were "a lot more aggressive in the way we cut and mixed the album". Black was also more satisfied with the vocals on this album. Several of the songs on The Hard Way, including "Burn One Down", were initially reported to be Black's responses to his situation with Ham. Co writer Nicholas refuted the rumors, maintaining that most of those songs were written in the late 1980s.

To promote the album, Black launched The Hard Way Tour on June 26, 1992. The tour ran for 11 months. Reviewers noticed that with this album Black presented a "new, sexier image", wearing tighter clothing and in many cases leaving behind his trademark hat. Black commented simply that he was bored wearing the hat all the time.

=== 1993–1999: Continued success ===
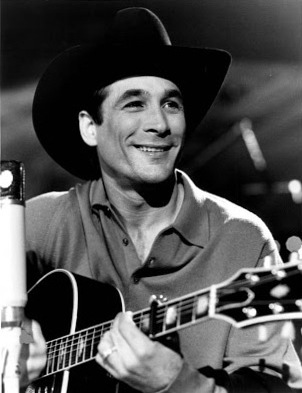
Black in 1994

Black's fourth album, No Time to Kill was released almost a year after The Hard Way. The album received mixed reviews. The Houston Chronicle noted that Black's duet with Wynonna Judd, "A Bad Goodbye", was "precisely the kind of radio-ready, big-production ballad that record companies tend to force on their artists when they sense that their careers are in trouble....[I]t sticks out like a sore thumb in his body of work." On the other hand, a review in Time magazine thought the duet helped Black show his emotions more intensely. Some reviewers also noted that in some of the more serious songs on the album, Black's voice sounded strained. On January 30, 1994, Black performed as part of the "Rockin' Country Sunday" halftime show at Super Bowl XXVII, along with Judd, Tanya Tucker, Travis Tritt, and Naomi Judd.

One Emotion followed in late 1994. Also a platinum certified album in the US, this album accounted for five straight top five hits. First was the number four "Untanglin' My Mind", a Merle Haggard co-write. After it came the number three "Wherever You Go", three-week number one "Summer's Comin'", the number two title track and finally the number four "Life Gets Away." The latter two were also number one country hits in Canada.

In 1996, Black became the fourth country music singer to earn a star on the Hollywood Walk of Fame. (Note: The first three were Gene Autry, Roy Rogers, and Garth Brooks.) Later that year, he released his first greatest-hits package. This was led off by the chart-topper "Like the Rain", which spent three weeks at number one. After it came the number six "Half Way Up", his first single since "One More Payment" to miss the top five.

Black's next album, 1997's Nothin' but the Taillights, was released to mediocre reviews. Thom Owens of AllMusic said that the album made no attempt to change his sound, and was "sturdy" but less country than his previous efforts. Lead-off single "Still Holding On", a duet with labelmate Martina McBride, became his first single to land outside the top 10, with a number 11 peak that year. He soon recovered his chart momentum with the number two "Something That We Do" followed by two straight chart-toppers in the album's Steve Wariner-penned title track and "The Shoes You're Wearing". The next two singles – the number 12 "Loosen Up My Strings" and number 29 "You Don't Need Me Now" – were less successful.

In 1998, he made a brief foray into big band jazz when he recorded a cover of the Christmas song "Rudolph the Red-Nosed Reindeer" for the soundtrack of the animated movie of the same name.

In 1999, Black released D'lectrified, which relied completely on acoustic instruments. Nevertheless, USA Today thought the "album sounds as full and brash as an electric album since he used creative arrangements and horn sections". Three of the songs on the albums were remakes of previous Black singles. Several others featured guest appearances by some of Black's idols, including Waylon Jennings, Kenny Loggins, and Eric Idle. The songs tended to be longer than most of those played on country radio, with many stretching more than five minutes.

=== 1999–2013: Later career ===
Black and Hartman welcomed their first child, Lily Pearl Black, in May 2001. Black took a three-year break from the music industry to stay home with his daughter. He explained that "it ended up not being a smart career move, but it was a real smart dad move. ... I wouldn't go back and try to do anything for my career in exchange for that."

During his sabbatical, Black spent time reassessing his career. After deciding he was unwilling to work within the current recording industry system, he formed his own record label, Equity Music Group. Black admitted that it was difficult to leave RCA. In his 14 years with the label, he had sold over 20 million records.

The new label operated under very different rules than those Black had begun his own career under. Artists were guaranteed ownership of their songs and were granted an equity stake in the label. The first release from the new label was Black's next album, Spend My Time; his ninth studio album was Black's first release in five years. The Houston Chronicle called it "arguably the most adventurous of his career".

In 2005, Black released Drinkin' Songs and Other Logic. Black chose the title of the album to limit himself to simple topics in his past. He explained: "I went out and bought all the music I grew up on that I didn't already have and spent three months listening to only that. Only stuff from before I started making records, so it was pre-1989—Waylon, Willie, Buck Owens, Haggard, Don Williams, Jim Croce. And what I discovered was a simplicity in song that I had moved away from. It was quite an emotional journey because these were all the songs that moved me and inspired me to do what I've been doing ever since."

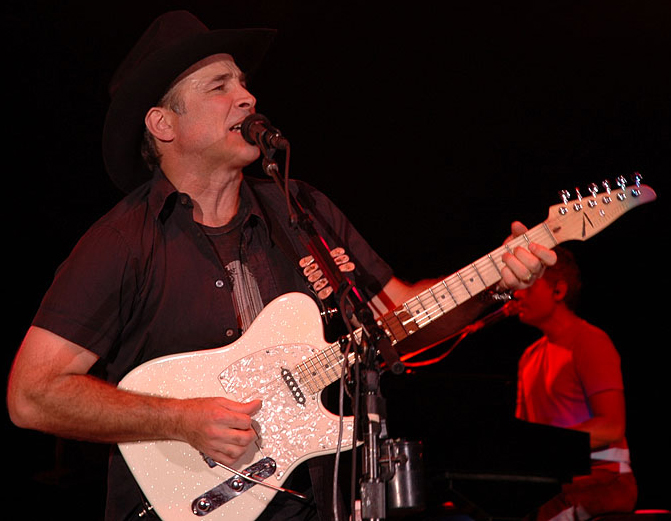
Black performing at a benefit concert

Black has continued to record new material, however. In 2007, he released the single "The Strong One" the first original song he has recorded that he did not write. The song was included on his first digital EP, released on March 11, 2008. Titled "The Long Cool EP," the collection features Black's single, "Long Cool Woman", "The Strong One" and a duet with his wife titled "You Still Get to Me". Equity Music Group closed its doors in December 2008 due to economic difficulties.

Black was also a judge for the 8th annual Independent Music Awards to support independent artists.

=== 2013–present: Return to music ===
Since the closure of his label in 2008, Black had intermittently hinted at a new album that never materialized. In 2013, he issued a Cracker Barrel-exclusive album which featured re-recorded versions of some of his biggest hits as well as three new songs. Black stated that he hired the same musicians that had played on the original versions to perform the new ones, and that some songs were approached from a "fresh angle" while others were made to be as close to the originals as possible.

In early 2015, Black appeared with Joe Nichols on the ACM Superstar Duets special, which featured modern artists teaming up with older icons that had influenced their music. In July 2015, it was reported that Black had signed a new record deal with independent label Thirty Tigers to release an album of new studio material in the Fall. The record title was revealed shortly thereafter as On Purpose, with a release date of September 25. Black's next album, Out of Sane, was released in 2020.

== Songwriting ==
Few country singers fill their albums primarily with their own material, and although RCA Records often pushed Black to record the material of other artists, he refused. Black recorded only his own songs until 2007, when he released the single "The Strong One". Many of his songs were the result of a collaboration with Hayden Nicholas. Their first collaboration, "Straight From the Factory", took them only 20 minutes to write, although Nicholas would later comment that "most of 'em weren't that easy".

Many listeners were incredulous that such a young man (27 at the release of his first album) could have such "a remarkably mature perspective". According to Black, "To me, a song is more than just something to sing. It's something to learn from. It's somebody else's true feeling. I'm always trying to get at the meaning. ... When I write a line, I'm doing the same thing. I'm looking at it from the perspective of if I was driving down the road listening to it, what am I gonna get out of it?"

Many of his songs make clever use of puns and other creative turns of phrase. While the wordplay in many of the songs on his earlier albums was widely appreciated, by the fourth album reviewers felt that the songs were not as high in quality. Rick Mitchell of the Houston Chronicle stated his opinion that The Hard Way "clever wordplay is no substitute for heartfelt emotion".

== Film and television ==
Shortly after his music career took off, he began receiving offers for acting roles. He turned down every request until 1994, when he was offered a bit part in the star-studded comedy film Maverick. Although the part required very little actual acting, after the movie's release Black received an increasing number of calls from directors who thought he would be perfect for a particular role. Black has appeared in several television shows, including Wings and The Larry Sanders Show. He has since starred in the 1998 television film, Still Holding On: The Legend of Cadillac Jack, based on the rodeo star Jack Favor, who was falsely accused of double murders in Haughton, Louisiana, in 1967. Lisa Hartman Black portrayed Ponder I. Favor, Jack's wife. Black had a major role in another television movie Going Home, and appeared briefly in the 2003 film Anger Management. In 2000, Black and Hartman guest starred on an episode of King of the Hill.

He has also had a presence on various reality television shows. In 2003, Black appeared on Nashville Star, where he acted as a mentor to the contestants. Later that year, Clint also appeared on the ABC sitcom Hope & Faith in the episode "Hope and Faith Get Randy". He later produced the debut album of series winner Buddy Jewell. In 2004, Clint appeared as himself in the TV show Las Vegas. In 2008, Black was a contestant on a short-lived CBS reality show, Secret Talents of the Stars, in which he practiced stand-up comedy. The following year, he competed on the second season of Celebrity Apprentice. He was fired after the eleventh task, placing himself in fifth place, although he returned as a member of Joan Rivers's victorious team in the season finale. In 2009, Black appeared on ABC's Extreme Makeover: Home Edition.

Black has enjoyed his television experiences, describing acting as "another way for me to expand my creative canvas. ... I love to challenge myself." He believes that most of his fans "just see me as a musician who is stepping into [television and film] temporarily and either doing it alright (sic) or not". More recently, he appeared in the movies Flicka 2 in 2010 and Flicka: Country Pride in 2012.

On July 4, 2012, Black appeared on an episode of Lifetime's reality series, Coming Home, which documents servicemen and women returning to their loved ones in surprise reunions. In the episode, he is featured helping two children write a song about their Army captain father, who is returning from Afghanistan to surprise his family.

On July 24, 2012, Black is surprised by History Detectives on PBS. In the episode, the show pays a visit to his Nashville residence, to uncover the story behind an artifact given to him by his wife decades ago.

In 2020, Black and Lisa appeared in season four of The Masked Singer as "Snow Owls", notably competing as the series' first duet competitors while riding in an egg-shaped vehicle.

Clint Black participated in the seventh season of Finding Your Roots with Henry Louis Gates, Jr. His episode aired in 2021.

Black co-wrote and performed the song "Devil's Den", which was part of the soundtrack for the first season of the Paramount+ show Landman.

== Musical styles and legacy ==
Merle Haggard, Waylon Jennings, George Strait, and Willie Nelson are Black's biggest musical influences. His musical style encompasses traditional country, honky-tonk and Western swing. His voice is described as a smooth baritone and was initially compared to Merle Haggard's. Black was self-taught on harmonica, guitar and bass at an early age. On his studio albums he plays acoustic and electric guitars as well as harmonica.

== Personal life ==
Black began dating actress Lisa Hartman in 1990. The couple kept their relationship very quiet. The first picture of the two of them together was not published until the week they were engaged. The couple married in Katy, Texas, in October 1991.

Black and Lisa Hartman Black have a daughter, Lily Pearl Black, born in 2001. As of 2002, he and his wife reside in Nashville, Tennessee, after living in Laurel Canyon, Los Angeles, California.

== Awards and nominations ==
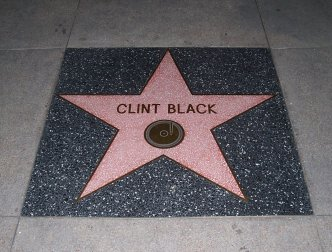
Clint Black's Star on the Hollywood Walk of Fame

=== Grammy Awards ===
Grammy awards and nominations
Year	Nominee / work	Award	Result
1990	"Killin' Time"	Best Male Country Vocal Performance	Nominated
1990	"A Better Man" (Note: Nominated alongside co-writer Hayden Nicholas)	Best Country Song	Nominated
1992	"Hold on Partner" (Note: Nominated alongside Roy Rogers)	Best Country Collaboration with Vocals	Nominated
1994	"A Bad Goodbye" (Note: Nominated alongside Wynonna)	Best Country Collaboration with Vocals	Nominated
1997	"Like the Rain"	Best Male Country Vocal Performance	Nominated
1998	"Something That We Do"	Best Male Country Vocal Performance	Nominated
1998	"Still Holding On" (Note: Nominated alongside Martina McBride)	Best Country Collaboration with Vocals	Nominated
1999	"Same Old Train" (Note: Nominated alongside Joe Diffie, Merle Haggard, Emmylou Harris, Alison Krauss, Patty Loveless, Earl Scruggs, Ricky Skaggs, Marty Stuart, Pam Tillis, Randy Travis, and Dwight Yoakam)	Best Country Collaboration with Vocals	Won
1999	"Nothin' but the Taillights"	Best Male Country Vocal Performance	Nominated
2000	"When I Said I Do" (Note: Nominated alongside Lisa Hartman Black)	Best Country Collaboration with Vocals	Nominated
2005	"Hey Good Lookin'" (Note: Nominated alongside Jimmy Buffett, Kenny Chesney, Alan Jackson, Toby Keith, and George Strait)	Best Country Collaboration with Vocals	Nominated

=== American Music Awards ===
American Music Awards and nominations
Year	Nominee / work	Award	Result
1990	Clint Black	Favorite Country New Artist	Won
1991	Clint Black	Favorite Country Male Artist	Nominated
1991	Killin' Time	Favorite Country Album	Nominated
1992	Put Yourself in My Shoes	Favorite Country Album	Nominated
1992	Clint Black	Favorite Country Male Artist	Nominated
1994	"A Bad Goodbye"	Favorite Country Single	Nominated
1998	Clint Black	Favorite Country Male Artist	Nominated

=== TNN/Music City News Country Awards & TNN Music Awards ===
TNN/Music City News Country Awards & TNN Music Awards and nominations
Year	Nominee / work	Award	Result
1990	Clint Black	Star of Tomorrow	Won
1990	Clint Black	Male Artist of the Year	Nominated
1990	Killin' Time	Album of the Year	Won
1991	Clint Black	Male Artist of the Year	Nominated
1993	George Jones and Friends (Note: George Jones' "Friends" also includes: Vince Gill, Mark Chesnutt, Garth Brooks, Travis Tritt, Joe Diffie, Alan Jackson, Pam Tillis, T. Graham Brown and Patty Loveless)	Vocal Collaboration of the Year	Nominated
1993	Roy Rogers and Clint Black	Vocal Collaboration of the Year	Nominated
1994	Clint Black and Wynonna	Vocal Collaboration of the Year	Nominated
1994	Common Thread: The Songs of the Eagles	Album of the Year	Nominated
2000	"When I Said I Do"	Song of the Year	Nominated
2000	"When I Said I Do"	Single of the Year	Nominated
2000	"When I Said I Do"	CMT Music Video of the Year	Nominated
2000	"When I Said I Do"	Collaborative Event of the Year	Won

=== Academy of Country Music Awards ===
Academy of Country Music awards and nominations
Year	Nominee / work	Award	Result
1990	Clint Black	Top New Male Vocalist	Won
1990	Clint Black	Top Male Vocalist of the Year	Won
1990	"A Better Man"	Single Record of the Year	Won
1990	"Killin' Time"	Single Record of the Year	Shortlisted
1990	"Killin' Time"	Song of the Year	Nominated
1990	Killin' Time	Album of the Year	Won
1991	Clint Black	Top Male Vocalist of the Year	Nominated
1991	Clint Black	Entertainer of the Year	Nominated
1991	"Walkin' Away"	Single Record of the Year	Shortlisted
1991	"Walkin' Away"	Song of the Year (Note: Nominated alongside co-writers Hayden Nicholas and Dick Gay)	Shortlisted
1992	"Where Are You Now"	Single Record of the Year	Nominated
1992	Roy Rogers and Clint Black	Top Vocal Duo of the Year	Nominated
1992	Clint Black	Top Male Vocalist of the Year	Nominated
1992	Clint Black	Entertainer of the Year	Nominated
1993	Clint Black	Entertainer of the Year	Shortlisted
1993	Clint Black	Top Male Vocalist of the Year	Shortlisted
1993	The Hard Way	Album of the Year	Shortlisted
1994	"A Bad Goodbye"	Single Record of the Year	Nominated
1994	Clint Black and Wynonna	Top Vocal Duo of the Year	Nominated
1994	Common Thread: The Songs of the Eagles	Album of the Year	Nominated
1994	Clint Black	Top Male Vocalist of the Year	Nominated
1994	Clint Black	Entertainer of the Year	Nominated
1995	Clint Black	Entertainer of the Year	Shortlisted
1995	Clint Black	Top Male Vocalist of the Year	Shortlisted
1998	"Something That We Do" (Note: Nominated alongside co-writer Skip Ewing)	Song of the Year	Nominated
1999	"Same Old Train"	Top Vocal Event of the Year	Nominated
2000	"When I Said I Do"	Top Vocal Event of the Year	Won
2000	"When I Said I Do"	Song of the Year	Shortlisted
2000	Clint Black	Top Male Vocalist of the Year	Shortlisted
2005	"Hey Good Lookin'"	Top Vocal Event of the Year	Nominated

=== Country Music Association Awards ===
Country Music Association awards and nominations
Year	Nominee / work	Award	Result
1989	Clint Black	Horizon Award	Won
1989	"A Better Man"	Song of the Year	Nominated
1989	"A Better Man"	Single of the Year	Nominated
1990	"Killin' Time"	Single of the Year	Nominated
1990	"Killin' Time"	Song of the Year	Nominated
1990	Clint Black	Male Vocalist of the Year	Won
1990	Clint Black	Entertainer of the Year	Nominated
1991	Put Yourself in My Shoes	Album of the Year	Nominated
1991	Clint Black	Male Vocalist of the Year	Nominated
1991	Clint Black	Entertainer of the Year	Nominated
1992	"Hold on Partner"	Vocal Event of the Year	Nominated
1993	"I Don't Need Your Rockin' Chair" (Note: Nominated alongside George Jones and Friends)	Vocal Event of the Year	Won
1993	"A Bad Goodbye"	Vocal Event of the Year	Nominated
1994	Common Thread: The Songs of the Eagles	Album of the Year	Won
1994	Rhythm, Country and Blues	Album of the Year	Nominated
1997	"Still Holding On"	Vocal Event of the Year	Nominated
2000	"When I Said I Do"	Vocal Event of the Year	Nominated
2004	"Hey Good Lookin'"	Vocal Event of the Year	Nominated

== Discography ==
Studio albums

- 1989: Killin' Time
- 1990: Put Yourself in My Shoes
- 1992: The Hard Way
- 1993: No Time to Kill
- 1994: One Emotion
- 1995: Looking for Christmas
- 1997: Nothin' but the Taillights
- 1999: D'lectrified
- 2004: Spend My Time
- 2004: Christmas with You
- 2005: Drinkin' Songs and Other Logic
- 2007: The Love Songs
- 2015: On Purpose
- 2020: Out of Sane

=== Billboard number-one hits ===
- "A Better Man" (1 week, 1989)
- "Killin' Time" (1 week, 1989)
- "Nobody's Home" (3 weeks, 1990)
- "Walkin' Away" (2 weeks, 1990)
- "Loving Blind" (2 weeks, 1991)
- "Where Are You Now" (2 weeks, 1991)
- "When My Ship Comes In" (2 weeks, 1993)
- "A Good Run of Bad Luck" (1 week, 1994)
- "Summer's Comin'" (3 weeks, 1995)
- "Like the Rain" (3 weeks, 1996)
- "Nothin' but the Taillights" (2 weeks, 1998)
- "The Shoes You're Wearing" (1 week, 1998)
- "When I Said I Do" (2 weeks, 1999)

== Filmography ==
- The Masked Singer (2020) - Snow Owls (with wife Lisa)
- Flicka: Country Pride (2012) – Toby
- Flicka 2 (2010) – Toby
- Las Vegas "Good Run of Bad Luck" (2004) - Himself
- Anger Management (2003) – Masseur
- The Rutles 2: Can't Buy Me Lunch (2002) – Himself
- Going Home (2000) – Dr. Warren
- Still Holding On: The Legend of Cadillac Jack (1998) – Cadillac Jack Favor
- Maverick (1994) – Sweet-Faced Gambler
- Wings "I Love Brian" (1993) – Himself
- Montana Christmas Skies (1991) – Clint Black, with John Denver, Kathy Mattea, Patty Loveless
