= Hayden Nicholas =

American musician

James Hayden Nicholas is an American country guitarist and songwriter.

Nicholas grew up in the Houston, Texas area. In the early 1980s, he was a member of the band Revolver, headlined by Tim McCrary, which played extensively in Texas. After a stint living in California, he returned to Texas, where, in 1987, he met then-struggling country singer Clint Black. At the time, Nicholas was a guitarist and songwriter with his own home studio. The two joined forces to write and record demo versions of songs that Black could use to land a recording deal. Their first collaboration, "Nobody's Home," helped Black land his recording contract in 1988.

The partnership between the two has continued strongly ever since. Nicholas serves as Black's bandleader, plays lead guitar, and cowrites with Black and others most of the songs that are on Black's albums. Often the two would retreat to a cabin in the Colorado mountains to hide out and write songs for the next album. Over sixty of their collaborations have appeared on Black's albums, with 15 of them hitting Number One on one of the music charts.

Nicholas has been twice nominated for the CMA Song of the Year, in 1989 for "A Better Man" and in 1990 for "Killin' Time," both co-written with (and recorded by) Clint Black. He has also been nominated for several Grammy Awards, and has won over fifty songwriting awards, including three "Triple Play Awards," given to a songwriter who has three works reach Number One in twelve months. One of his collaborations with Black, The Hard Way, was included in the musical Urban Cowboy, which was nominated for a 2003 Tony Award for Best Original Score.

Nicholas has expanded his efforts, co-producing the debut album of Texas band Cooder Graw and serving as sole producer on the band's second attempt. He also played guitar on the Asleep at the Wheel album Ride with Bob, and wrote a novel, Hands Treasure, which has been optioned by a motion picture company.

Nicholas lost his mother before the release of Clint Black's 2005 album Drinkin' Songs and Other Logic, prompting them to include the song "Back Home in Heaven" on the album.

Nicholas's first book, Ezekiel's Choice was released on February 15, 2013, by West Bow Press.

== Sources ==
- Yahoo Music Biography of Clint Black
