= 1990 in country music =

This is a list of notable events in country music that took place in the year 1990.

== Events ==
- January 20 — Billboard magazine begins basing the Hot Country Singles chart entirely on radio airplay through Nielsen Broadcast Data Systems (BDS), which uses a computerized system to detect actual radio spins. The number of chart positions is reduced from 100 to 75. The new system has an immediate effect on how long the year's biggest songs stay at No. 1:
  - February 3 — "Nobody’s Home" by Clint Black becomes the first three-week No. 1 since Randy Travis' "Forever and Ever, Amen" in 1987.
  - April 7 — Travis' "Hard Rock Bottom of Your Heart" breaks the four-week barrier, the first since 1978's "Mamas Don't Let Your Babies Grow Up to Be Cowboys" by Waylon Jennings and Willie Nelson.
  - July 7 — "Love Without End, Amen" by George Strait is Billboard's first five-week No. 1 song, matching 1977's "Here You Come Again" by Dolly Parton. Incidentally, "Love Without End, Amen" is Strait's first multi-week chart-topper, after his first 18 No. 1s had spent just one week on top.

Just 23 songs would reach the chart's summit in 1990, 13 of them multi-weekers; this was fewer than half the number that reached the top of the chart a year earlier, and the fewest since 1972.

- November 30 Minnie Pearl celebrates her 50th Grand Ole Opry anniversary.

=== No dates ===
- The Smithsonian Institution releases Classic Country Music: A Smithsonian Collection, a 100-track, four-volume set including the most important and notable songs in the genre's history, from 1924 to 1987. The set, which includes an 84-page booklet by historian Bill Malone, replaces the Smithsonian's eight-volume, 143-track set – titled The Smithsonian Collection of Classic Country Music – issued in 1981. The release of Classic Country Music: A Smithsonian Collection continues a trend towards chronicling the genre's history via compact disc during the late 1980s and early 1990s. Time-Life Music's Country USA series continued to issue new albums, while Columbia Records issues its five-volume Country Classics series during the summer. Rhino Records also releases ten volumes of Billboard Top Country Singles, each depicting the top 10 songs from the years 1959 through 1968.

== Top hits of the year ==
=== Singles released by American artists ===
US	CAN	Single	Artist	Reference
17	29	Ain't Necessarily So	Willie Nelson	
15	16	Ain't Nobody's Business	Hank Williams Jr.	
11	—	American Boy	Eddie Rabbitt	
2	1	Back in My Younger Days	Don Williams	
14	18	Back Where I Come From	Mac McAnally	
9	10	The Battle Hymn of Love	Kathy Mattea & Tim O'Brien	
15	19	Black Coffee	Lacy J. Dalton	
12	21	Black Velvet	Robin Lee	
5	4	Born to Be Blue	The Judds	
11	11	Bring Back Your Love to Me	Earl Thomas Conley	
1	1	Chains	Patty Loveless	
2	5	Chasin' That Neon Rainbow	Alan Jackson	
1	1	Come Next Monday	K. T. Oslin	
2	4	Crazy in Love	Conway Twitty	
1	1	The Dance	Garth Brooks	
5	4	Dancy's Dream	Restless Heart	
7	3	The Domino Theory	Steve Wariner	
6	11	Don't Go Out	Tanya Tucker with T. Graham Brown	
4	3	Drinking Champagne	George Strait	
15	54	Dumas Walker	The Kentucky Headhunters	
4	3	Fast Movin' Train	Restless Heart	
8	4	A Few Ole Country Boys	Randy Travis & George Jones	
1	9	Five Minutes	Lorrie Morgan	
5	7	Fool Such as I	Baillie & the Boys	
6	5	Fourteen Minutes Old	Doug Stone	
1	1	Friends in Low Places	Garth Brooks	
5	2	Ghost in This House	Shenandoah	
10	16	Good Friends, Good Whiskey, Good Lovin'	Hank Williams Jr.	
1	1	Good Times	Dan Seals	
16	16	Guardian Angels	The Judds	
1	1	Hard Rock Bottom of Your Heart	Randy Travis	
4	7	He Talks to Me	Lorrie Morgan	
2	1	He Walked on Water	Randy Travis	
25	6	He Was On to Somethin' (So He Made You)	Ricky Skaggs	
13	5	Heartbreak Hurricane	Ricky Skaggs	
1	1	Help Me Hold On	Travis Tritt	
3	1	Here in the Real World	Alan Jackson	
8	6	Hillbilly Rock	Marty Stuart	
2	2	Holdin' a Good Hand	Lee Greenwood	
1	1	Home	Joe Diffie	
26	12	Honky Tonk Blues	Pirates of the Mississippi	
20	15	Hummingbird	Ricky Skaggs	
9	4	I Can't Turn the Tide	Baillie & the Boys	
7	8	I Could Be Persuaded	The Bellamy Brothers	
3	3	I Fell in Love	Carlene Carter	
31	17	I Go to Pieces	Southern Pacific	
2	1	I Meant Every Word He Said	Ricky Van Shelton	
8	14	I Watched It All (On My Radio)	Lionel Cartwright	
4	5	I'd Be Better Off (In a Pine Box)	Doug Stone	
2	1	I'm Gonna Be Somebody	Travis Tritt	
3	3	I'm Over You	Keith Whitley	
1	1	I've Come to Expect It from You	George Strait	
1	1	I've Cried My Last Tear for You	Ricky Van Shelton	
6	4	If Looks Could Kill	Rodney Crowell	
6	5	If You Could Only See Me Now	T. Graham Brown	
23	15	If You Want to Be My Woman	Merle Haggard	
13	18	In Another Lifetime	The Desert Rose Band	
12	6	In My Eyes	Lionel Cartwright	
10	6	Island	Eddy Raven	
1	1	It Ain't Nothin'	Keith Whitley	
5	9	It's You Again	Skip Ewing	
1	1	Jukebox in My Mind	Alabama	
4	11	Just as Long as I Have You	Don Williams	
17	19	Keep It in the Middle of the Road	Exile	
7	6	Leave It Alone	The Forester Sisters	
7	7	Little Girl	Reba McEntire	
21	14	Love Is Strange	Kenny Rogers & Dolly Parton	
1	1	Love on Arrival	Dan Seals	
1	1	Love Without End, Amen	George Strait	
3	1	Many a Long & Lonesome Highway	Rodney Crowell	
25	17	Maybe	Kenny Rogers (with Holly Dunn)	
18	9	Moonshadow Road	T. Graham Brown	
2	2	My Arms Stay Open All Night	Tanya Tucker	
7	6	My Heart Is Set on You	Lionel Cartwright	
22	12	My Past Is Present	Rodney Crowell	
3	7	Never Knew Lonely	Vince Gill	
1	1	Next to You, Next to Me	Shenandoah	
20	4	The Night's Too Long	Patty Loveless	
1	1	No Matter How High	The Oak Ridge Boys	
1	1	Nobody's Home	Clint Black	
2	3	Nobody's Talking	Exile	
2	1	Not Counting You	Garth Brooks	
3	1	Nothing's News	Clint Black	
8	19	Oh Lonesome Me	The Kentucky Headhunters	
13	7	Oklahoma Swing	Vince Gill with Reba McEntire	
5	3	On Down the Line	Patty Loveless	
1	1	On Second Thought	Eddie Rabbitt	
8	14	One Man Woman	The Judds	
8	7	Overnight Success	George Strait	
3	2	Pass It On Down	Alabama	
23	16	Perfect	Baillie & the Boys	
8	13	Precious Thing	Steve Wariner	
4	3	Put Yourself in My Shoes	Clint Black	
33	19	Puttin' the Dark Back into the Night	Sawyer Brown	
7	8	Quittin' Time	Mary Chapin Carpenter	
3	4	Richest Man on Earth	Paul Overstreet	
10	6	Right in the Wrong Direction	Vern Gosdin	
8	6	Runnin' with the Wind	Eddie Rabbitt	
17	33	Searchin' for Some Kind of Clue	Billy Joe Royal	
6	5	See If I Care	Shenandoah	
2	2	Seein' My Father in Me	Paul Overstreet	
2	13	She Came from Fort Worth	Kathy Mattea	
12	15	Simple Man	Charlie Daniels Band	
14	11	Someone Else's Trouble Now	Highway 101	
14	8	Something of a Dreamer	Mary Chapin Carpenter	
6	18	Sooner or Later	Eddy Raven	
1	1	Southern Star	Alabama	
6	3	Start All Over Again	The Desert Rose Band	
2	1	Statue of a Fool	Ricky Van Shelton	
10	6	Story of Love	The Desert Rose Band	
2	1	Stranger Things Have Happened	Ronnie Milsap	
18	—	Tell Me Why	Jann Browne	
4	3	That Just About Does It	Vern Gosdin	
8	4	There You Are	Willie Nelson	
14	19	This Ain't My First Rodeo	Vern Gosdin	
11	9	This Side of Goodbye	Highway 101	
13	13	'Til a Tear Becomes a Rose	Keith Whitley & Lorrie Morgan	
2	3	Till I Can't Take It Anymore	Billy Joe Royal	
39	18	Till I See You Again	Kevin Welch	
26	19	Time's Up	Southern Pacific & Carlene Carter	
3	1	Too Cold at Home	Mark Chesnutt	
2	1	Walk On	Reba McEntire	
1	1	Walkin' Away	Clint Black	
4	5	Walkin', Talkin', Cryin', Barely Beatin' Broken Heart	Highway 101	
3	2	Walking Shoes	Tanya Tucker	
3	3	Wanted	Alan Jackson	
20	16	Western Girls	Marty Stuart	
2	5	When I Call Your Name	Vince Gill	
5	10	When I Could Come Home to You	Steve Wariner	
10	11	When It's Gone	Nitty Gritty Dirt Band	
40	18	When Love Comes Callin'	Sawyer Brown	
21	17	When Somebody Loves You	Restless Heart	
10	13	Where've You Been	Kathy Mattea	
1	1	Who's Lonely Now	Highway 101	
5	2	Wrong	Waylon Jennings	
7	5	Yet	Exile	
1	1	You Lie	Reba McEntire	
1	1	You Really Had Me Going	Holly Dunn	

=== Singles released by Canadian artists ===
US	CAN	Single	Artist	Reference
—	20	After All	Anita Perras	
—	20	Ain't No Trains to Nashville	Dick Damron	
—	9	Always Hum a Song in Your Soul	Morris P. Rainville	
—	4	Bachelor Girl	George Fox	
—	12	The Colour of Your Collar	Gary Fjellgaard	
—	19	Couldn't See the Gold	Tommy Hunter with Janie Fricke	
—	10	Daddy, Sing to Me	Lisa Brokop	
—	10	Dreamin' Ain't Cheatin'	Carroll Baker	
5	6	Feed This Fire	Anne Murray	
62	3	Goodbye, So Long, Hello	Prairie Oyster	
—	9	Here Comes My Baby	Anita Perras	
—	3	How Many Times	Family Brown	
—	17	I Broke His Heart	Jenny Lee West	
70	5	I Don't Hurt Anymore	Prairie Oyster	
—	9	I Want to Fly	Errol Ranville	
—	9	I'll Accept the Rose	Rita MacNeil	
—	10	In My Heart	Gary Fjellgaard with Linda Kidder	
—	10	Lime Rickey	George Fox	
—	14	Live Fast, Love Hard, Die Young	The Good Brothers	
—	10	Luck in My Eyes	k.d. lang	
—	16	Never Be Sorry	Greg Paul	
32	4	New Kind of Love	Michelle Wright	
—	10	No Trespassing	George Fox	
—	19	Once the Magic's Gone	Cindi Cain	
—	13	Pioneers	Family Brown	
—	8	Quittin' Time	Michael Dee	
—	9	Rosanne	Albert Hall	
—	17	Rumour	Dan Rogers	
—	10	She Told Me So	The Good Brothers	
—	17	Since the Rain	Ian Tyson	
—	7	Somewhere on the Island	Gary Fjellgaard	
—	6	Start of Something New	Terry Carisse with Tracey Brown	
—	10	This Time	Patricia Conroy	
55	9	Three Days	k.d. lang	
—	10	Touch My Heart	Anita Perras	
—	17	Why Do I Think of You Today	Rita MacNeil	
72	14	Woman's Intuition	Michelle Wright	

== Top new album releases ==
US	Album	Artist	Record label
21	10 Years of Greatest Hits	Vern Gosdin	Columbia
11	America (The Way I See It)	Hank Williams, Jr.	Curb/Warner Bros.
23	Black Velvet	Robin Lee	Atlantic
8	A Collection of Hits	Kathy Mattea	Mercury/PolyGram
3	Country Club	Travis Tritt	Warner Bros.
25	Cowboy Songs	Michael Martin Murphey	Warner Bros.
12	Doug Stone	Doug Stone	Epic
24	Duets	Emmylou Harris	Warner Bros.
9	The Eagle	Waylon Jennings	Epic
11	Extra Mile	Shenandoah	Columbia
6	Fast Movin' Train	Restless Heart	RCA Nashville
5	Greatest Hits	Keith Whitley	RCA Nashville
4	Here in the Real World	Alan Jackson	Arista Nashville
1	Heroes & Friends	Randy Travis	Warner Bros.
4	Highwayman 2	The Highwaymen	Columbia
19	I Fell in Love	Carlene Carter	Reprise
21	I Watched It on the Radio	Lionel Cartwright	MCA Nashville
7	If There Was a Way	Dwight Yoakam	Reprise
23	Interiors	Rosanne Cash	Columbia
20	Laredo	Steve Wariner	MCA Nashville
1	Livin' It Up	George Strait	MCA Nashville
2	Lone Wolf	Hank Williams, Jr.	Curb/Warner Bros.
5	Love Can Build a Bridge	The Judds	RCA/Curb
5	Love in a Small Town	K. T. Oslin	RCA Nashville
21	Love Is Strange	Kenny Rogers	Reprise
1	No Fences	Garth Brooks	Capitol Nashville
13	On Arrival	Dan Seals	Capitol Nashville
12	On Down the Line	Patty Loveless	MCA Nashville
24	Out of the Shadows	Billy Joe Royal	Atlantic
17	Pages of Life	Desert Rose Band	Curb/MCA Nashville
3	Pass It on Down	Alabama	RCA Nashville
12	Pirates of the Mississippi	Pirates of the Mississippi	Capitol Nashville
1	Put Yourself in My Shoes	Clint Black	RCA Nashville
2	Rumor Has It	Reba McEntire	MCA Nashville
1	RVS III	Ricky Van Shelton	Columbia
11	Shooting Straight in the Dark	Mary Chapin Carpenter	Columbia
18	Tennessee Woman	Tanya Tucker	Capitol Nashville
25	Texas Tornados	Texas Tornados	Reprise
23	A Thousand Winding Roads	Joe Diffie	Epic
12	Too Cold at Home	Mark Chesnutt	MCA Nashville
12	Young Man	Billy Dean	SBK/Liberty

=== Other top albums ===
US	Album	Artist	Record label
47	Blue Jungle	Merle Haggard	Curb
31	Born for Trouble	Willie Nelson	Columbia
45	Brand New Dance	Emmylou Harris	Reprise
44	Breaking New Ground	Wild Rose	Capitol Nashville
41	Buffalo Zone	Sweethearts of the Rodeo	Columbia
33	Bumper to Bumper	T. Graham Brown	Capitol Nashville
71	Christmas Memories	Steve Wariner	MCA Nashville
54	Come Hold Me	The Forester Sisters	Warner Bros.
42	County Line	Southern Pacific	Warner Bros.
35	Crazy in Love	Conway Twitty	MCA Nashville
61	Different Kind of Fire	Prairie Oyster	RCA Nashville
63	Down That River Road	Larry Boone	Mercury/PolyGram
27	Greatest Hits	Highway 101	Warner Bros.
26	Greatest Hits	Sawyer Brown	Capitol/Curb
35	Greatest Hits, Volume II	Earl Thomas Conley	RCA Nashville
54	Greatest Hits Volume III	Conway Twitty	MCA Nashville
57	Hardin County Line	Mark Collie	MCA Nashville
45	Have a Little Faith	Jo-El Sonnier	RCA Nashville
47	Heart Full of Love	Holly Dunn	Warner Bros.
64	Heart Over Mind	Tammy Wynette	Epic
69	Holdin' a Good Hand	Lee Greenwood	Capitol Nashville
74	Home for Christmas	Dolly Parton	Columbia
69	How 'bout Us	Girls Next Door	Atlantic
63	Imagine That	The O'Kanes	Columbia
34	Jersey Boy	Eddie Rabbitt	Capitol Nashville
73	Keepin' Me Up Nights	Asleep at the Wheel	Arista Nashville
69	Kevin Welch	Kevin Welch	Reprise
26	Lacy J.	Lacy J. Dalton	Capitol Nashville
35	The Lights of Home	Baillie & the Boys	RCA Nashville
57	Live at Liberty Lunch	Joe Ely	MCA Nashville
43	Lying to the Moon	Matraca Berg	RCA Nashville
49	Marsha Thornton	Marsha Thornton	MCA Nashville
75	Missing You	The Marcy Brothers	Warner Bros.
31	Music, Memories and You	The Statler Brothers	Mercury/PolyGram
27	Neck and Neck	Chet Atkins & Mark Knopfler	Columbia
72	No Nonsense	Barbara Mandrell	Capitol Nashville
71	Reality Check	The Bellamy Brothers	Curb/MCA Nashville
53	The Rest of the Dream	Nitty Gritty Dirt Band	MCA Nashville
63	Simple Life	Mac McAnally	Warner Bros.
42	Still Standing	Exile	Arista Nashville
72	Stone by Stone	Tim Mensy	Columbia
46	Tell Me Why	Jann Browne	Curb
62	Tim Ryan	Tim Ryan	Epic
31	Tough All Over	Shelby Lynne	Epic
56	True Love	Don Williams	RCA Nashville
40	Version of the Truth	Foster & Lloyd	RCA Nashville
64	Well Travelled Love	Kelly Willis	MCA Nashville
51	What a Way to Go	Ray Kennedy	Atlantic
65	When the Night Falls	Black Tie	Bench
66	Wood, Wind and Stone	David Lynn Jones	Mercury/PolyGram
35	You Oughta Be Here with Me	George Jones	Epic
47	You Will	Anne Murray	Capitol

== On television ==
=== Regular series ===
- Hee Haw (1969–1993, syndicated)

== Births ==
- January 8 – Frank Ray, singer known for his 2022 hit "Country'd Look Good on You".
- March 2 — Luke Combs, singer-songwriter of the 2010s.
- March 30 — Thomas Rhett, singer-songwriter, son of singer-songwriter Rhett Akins.
- April 10 — Maren Morris, musician and singer-songwriter known for her 2016 hit "My Church".
- April 24 — Carly Pearce, singer-songwriter of the 2010s.
- May 17 — Kree Harrison, singer and musician, who was the runner-up on the twelfth season of American Idol.
- May 27 — Brett Kissel, Canadian country singer of the 2010s.
- July 23 — Neil Perry, member of The Band Perry.
- July 27 — Cheyenne Kimball, member of Gloriana from 2008–2011.
- October 22 — Dylan Scott, singer known for his hits "My Girl" and "Hooked".

== Deaths ==
- April 26 – Wesley Rose, 72, president of Acuff-Rose Music publishing.
- August 15 — Lew DeWitt, 52, tenor and founding member of the Statler Brothers (complications from Crohn's disease)
- October 31 — Carl Belew, 59, best known for writing the song "Am I That Easy to Forget" (cancer)

== Hall of Fame inductees ==
=== Country Music Hall of Fame inductees ===
- Tennessee Ernie Ford (1919–1991)

=== Canadian Country Music Hall of Fame inductees ===
- Gordie Tapp
- Ron Sparling

== Major awards ==
=== Grammy Awards ===
- Best Female Country Vocal Performance — "Where've You Been", Kathy Mattea
- Best Male Country Vocal Performance — "When I Call Your Name", Vince Gill
- Best Country Performance by a Duo or Group with Vocal — Pickin' on Nashville, The Kentucky Headhunters
- Best Country Collaboration with Vocals — "Poor Boy Blues", Chet Atkins and Mark Knopfler
- Best Country Instrumental Performance — "So Soft, Your Goodbye", Chet Atkins and Mark Knopfler
- Best Country Song — "Where've You Been", Don Henry and Jon Vezner
- Best Bluegrass Recording — "I've Got That Old Feeling", Alison Krauss

=== Juno Awards ===
- Country Male Vocalist of the Year — George Fox
- Country Female Vocalist of the Year — Rita MacNeil
- Country Group or Duo of the Year — Prairie Oyster

=== Academy of Country Music ===
- Entertainer of the Year — Garth Brooks
- Song of the Year — "The Dance", Tony Arata (Performer: Garth Brooks)
- Single of the Year — "Friends in Low Places", Garth Brooks
- Album of the Year — No Fences, Garth Brooks
- Top Male Vocalist — Garth Brooks
- Top Female Vocalist — Reba McEntire
- Top Vocal Duo — The Judds
- Top Vocal Group — Shenandoah
- Top New Male Vocalist — Alan Jackson
- Top New Female Vocalist — Shelby Lynne
- Top New Vocal Duo or Group — Pirates of the Mississippi
- Video of the Year — "The Dance", Garth Brooks (Director: John Lloyd Miller)

=== ARIA Awards ===
(presented in Sydney on March 26, 1990)

- Best Country Album - Warragul (John Williamson)

=== Canadian Country Music Association ===
- Bud Country Fans' Choice Award — k.d. lang
- Male Artist of the Year — George Fox
- Female Artist of the Year — Michelle Wright
- Group of the Year — Prairie Oyster
- SOCAN Song of the Year — "Pioneers", Barry Brown
- Single of the Year — "Goodbye, So Long, Hello", Prairie Oyster
- Album of the Year — Absolute Torch and Twang, k.d. lang
- Top Selling Album — Rita, Rita MacNeil
- Video of the Year — "Pioneers", Family Brown
- Vista Rising Star Award — Patricia Conroy
- Duo of the Year — Gary Fjellgaard and Linda Kidder

=== Country Music Association ===
- Entertainer of the Year — George Strait
- Song of the Year — "Where've You Been", Don Henry and Jon Vezner (Performer: Kathy Mattea)
- Single of the Year — "When I Call Your Name", Vince Gill
- Album of the Year — Pickin' on Nashville, The Kentucky Headhunters
- Male Vocalist of the Year — Clint Black
- Female Vocalist of the Year — Kathy Mattea
- Vocal Duo of the Year — The Judds
- Vocal Group of the Year — The Kentucky Headhunters
- Horizon Award — Garth Brooks
- Music Video of the Year — "The Dance", Garth Brooks (Director: John Lloyd Miller)
- Vocal Event of the Year — "'Til a Tear Becomes a Rose", Lorrie Morgan and Keith Whitley
- Musician of the Year — Johnny Gimble

== Other links ==
- Country Music Association
- Inductees of the Country Music Hall of Fame
