= List of RPM number-one country singles of 1991 =

These are the Canadian number-one country songs of 1991, per the RPM Country Tracks chart.

Issue date	Title	Artist	Source
January 19	I've Come to Expect It From You	George Strait	
January 26	Unanswered Prayers	Garth Brooks	
February 2	Unanswered Prayers	Garth Brooks	
February 9	Rumor Has It	Reba McEntire	
February 16	Rumor Has It	Reba McEntire	
February 23	Brother Jukebox	Mark Chesnutt	
March 2	Til I Am Myself Again	Blue Rodeo	
March 9	Walk on Faith	Mike Reid	
March 16	Walk on Faith	Mike Reid	
March 23	If You Want Me To	Joe Diffie	
March 30	I'd Love You All Over Again	Alan Jackson	
April 6	Loving Blind	Clint Black	
April 13	Two of a Kind, Workin' on a Full House	Garth Brooks	
April 20	Heroes and Friends	Randy Travis	
April 27	Heroes and Friends	Randy Travis	
May 4	Down Home	Alabama	
May 11	Down Home	Alabama	
May 18	Rockin' Years	Dolly Parton with Ricky Van Shelton	
May 25	Drift Off to Dream	Travis Tritt	
June 1	If I Know Me	George Strait	
June 8	In a Different Light	Doug Stone	
June 15	Meet in the Middle	Diamond Rio	
June 22	Meet in the Middle	Diamond Rio	
June 29	The Thunder Rolls	Garth Brooks	
July 6	The Thunder Rolls	Garth Brooks	
July 13	The Thunder Rolls	Garth Brooks	
July 20	Point of Light	Randy Travis	
July 27	Point of Light	Randy Travis	
August 3	Don't Rock the Jukebox	Alan Jackson	
August 10	I Am a Simple Man	Ricky Van Shelton	
August 17	She's in Love with the Boy	Trisha Yearwood	
August 24	She's in Love with the Boy	Trisha Yearwood	
August 31	You Know Me Better Than That	George Strait	
September 7	You Know Me Better Than That	George Strait	
September 14	Fallin' Out of Love	Reba McEntire	
September 21	Down to My Last Teardrop	Tanya Tucker	
September 28	Brand New Man	Brooks & Dunn	
October 5	You Know Me Better Than That	George Strait	
October 12	Where Are You Now	Clint Black	
October 19	Rodeo	Garth Brooks	
October 26	Rodeo	Garth Brooks	
November 2	I Thought It Was You	Doug Stone	
November 9	Keep It Between the Lines	Ricky Van Shelton	
November 16	Anymore	Travis Tritt	
November 23	Anymore	Travis Tritt	
November 30	Shameless	Garth Brooks	
December 7	Shameless	Garth Brooks	
December 14	Forever Together	Randy Travis	
December 21	For My Broken Heart	Reba McEntire	

== See also ==
- 1991 in music
- List of number-one country hits of 1991 (U.S.)
