= List of Hot Country Singles & Tracks number ones of 1991 =

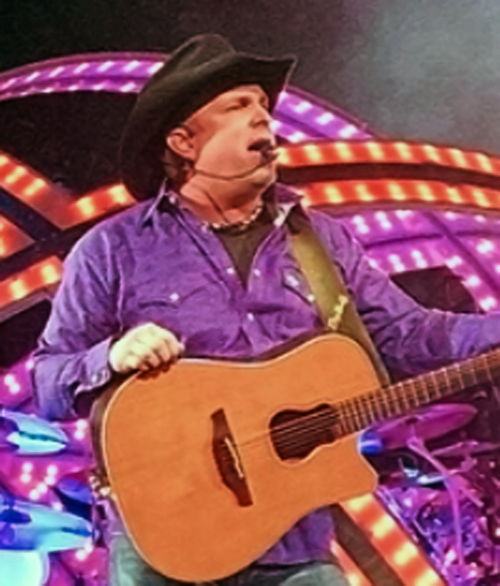
Garth Brooks achieved four number ones in 1991.

Hot Country Songs is a chart that ranks the top-performing country music songs in the United States, published by Billboard magazine. In 1991, 30 different songs topped the chart, then published under the title Hot Country Singles & Tracks, in 52 issues of the magazine, based on weekly airplay data from country music radio stations compiled by Nielsen Broadcast Data Systems.

George Strait's song "I've Come to Expect It from You" began the year at number one, having held the top position for the last four weeks of 1990. The next week, Garth Brooks achieved the first of his eventual four number ones of the year with his song "Unanswered Prayers". Brooks' four was the most number ones for the year by any act, though Alan Jackson and George Strait would each have three songs reach the top of the chart. Ricky Van Shelton reached number one twice as a solo performer, and once in collaboration with Dolly Parton on her song "Rockin' Years". Three songs spent three weeks each at the top of the chart, the most of any song for the year: "Down Home" by Alabama, "Don't Rock the Jukebox" by Alan Jackson, and "You Know Me Better Than That" by George Strait.

Several acts hit number one with their debut singles during the year. Diamond Rio hit number one in June with the band's debut single "Meet in the Middle". Trisha Yearwood accomplished the same feat in August with her debut single "She's in Love with the Boy" Brooks & Dunn's debut single as a duo, "Brand New Man", topped the charts in September, although both had previously released songs as solo performers. Lionel Cartwright charted the only number one of his career with "Leap of Faith" in the September 21 issue of Billboard. Yearwood and Parton were two of three women to reach the top of the chart in 1991, Reba McEntire being the other one. The year-ending number one was "My Next Broken Heart" by Brooks & Dunn.

== Chart history ==
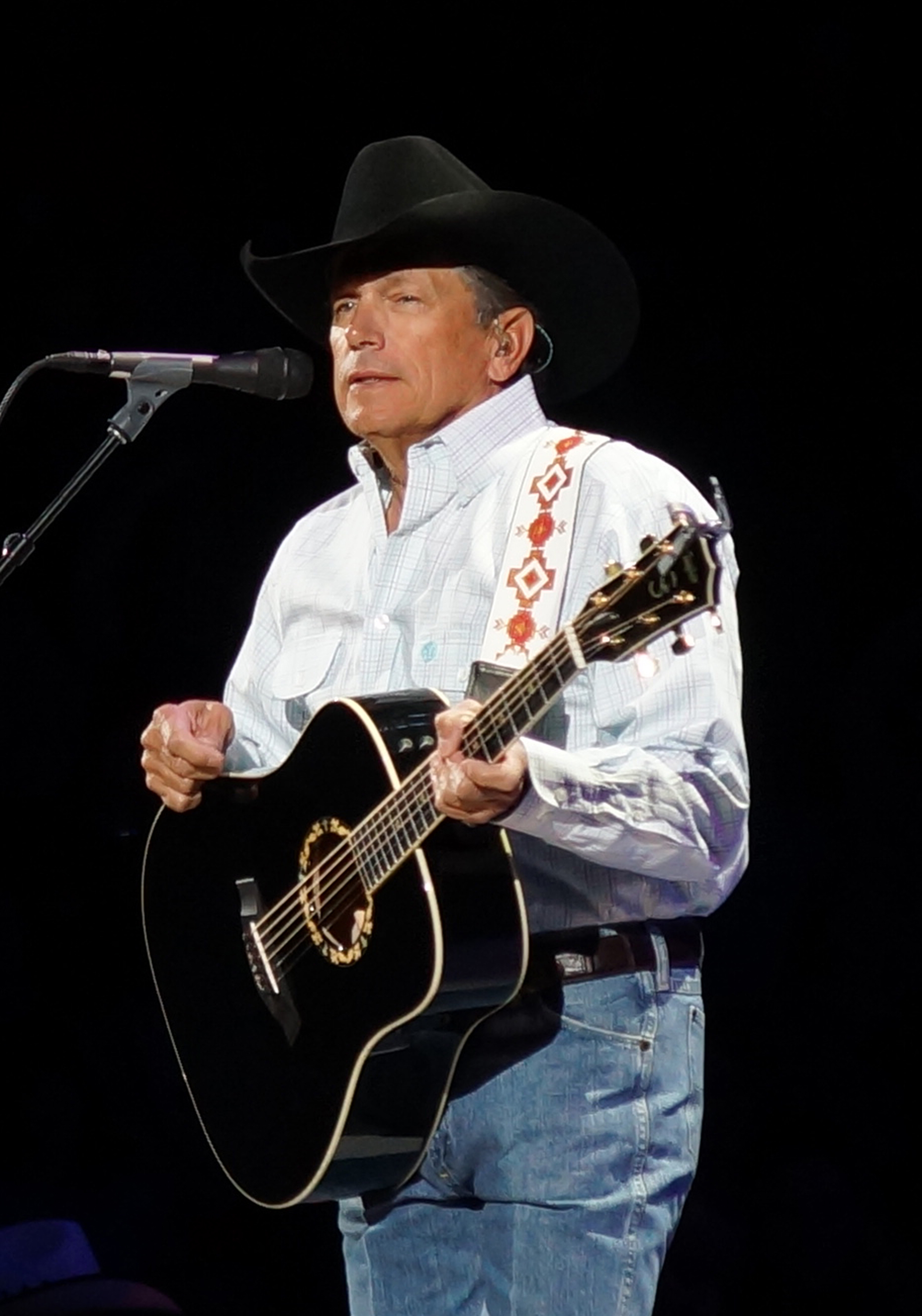
George Strait began the year at number one.

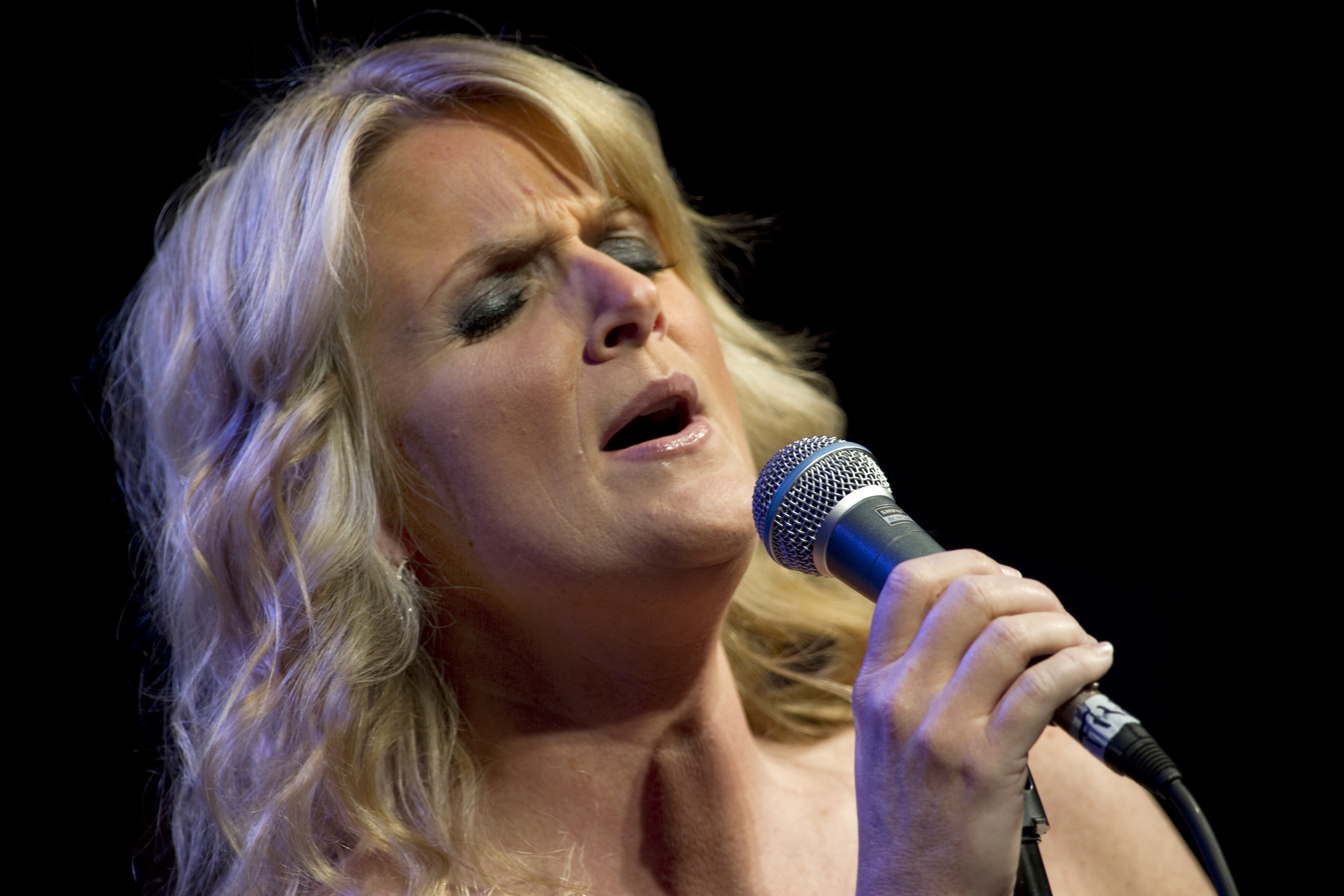
Trisha Yearwood reached number one with her debut single.

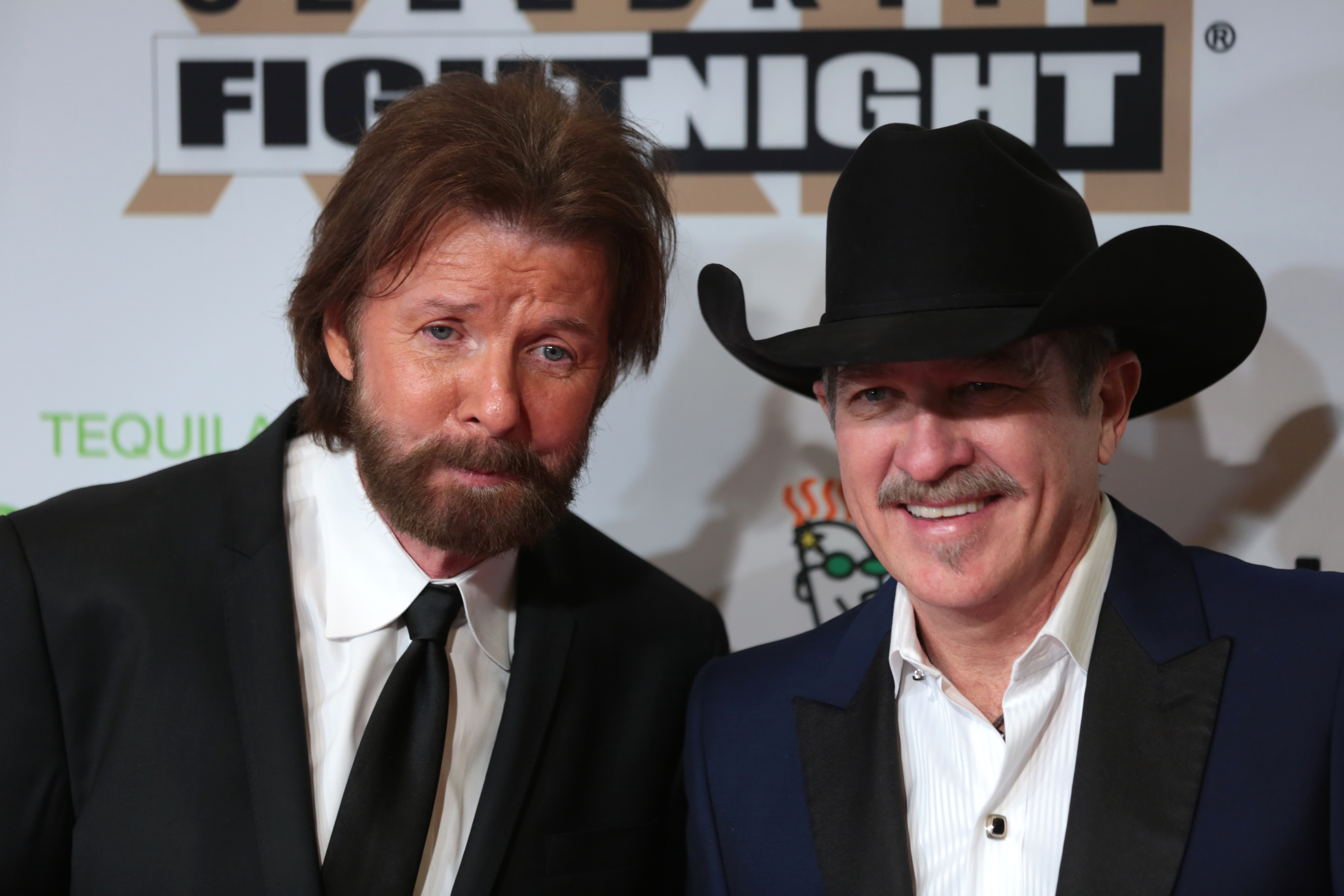
Brooks & Dunn spent four weeks at number one with two different songs.

Issue date	Title	Artist(s)	Ref.
January 5	"I've Come to Expect It from You"	George Strait	
January 12	"Unanswered Prayers"	Garth Brooks	
January 19	"Unanswered Prayers"	Garth Brooks	
January 26	"Forever's as Far as I'll Go"	Alabama	
February 2	"Daddy's Come Around"	Paul Overstreet	
February 9	"Brother Jukebox"	Mark Chesnutt	
February 16	"Brother Jukebox"	Mark Chesnutt	
February 23	"Walk on Faith"	Mike Reid	
March 2	"Walk on Faith"	Mike Reid	
March 9	"I'd Love You All Over Again"	Alan Jackson	
March 16	"I'd Love You All Over Again"	Alan Jackson	
March 23	"Loving Blind"	Clint Black	
March 30	"Loving Blind"	Clint Black	
April 6	"Two of a Kind, Workin' on a Full House"	Garth Brooks	
April 13	"Down Home"	Alabama	
April 20	"Down Home"	Alabama	
April 27	"Down Home"	Alabama	
May 4	"Rockin' Years"	Dolly Parton with Ricky Van Shelton	
May 11	"If I Know Me"	George Strait	
May 18	"If I Know Me"	George Strait	
May 25	"In a Different Light"	Doug Stone	
June 1	"Meet in the Middle"	Diamond Rio	
June 8	"Meet in the Middle"	Diamond Rio	
June 15	"If the Devil Danced (In Empty Pockets)"	Joe Diffie	
June 22	"The Thunder Rolls"	Garth Brooks	
June 29	"The Thunder Rolls"	Garth Brooks	
July 6	"Don't Rock the Jukebox"	Alan Jackson	
July 13	"Don't Rock the Jukebox"	Alan Jackson	
July 20	"Don't Rock the Jukebox"	Alan Jackson	
July 27	"I Am a Simple Man"	Ricky Van Shelton	
August 3	"She's in Love with the Boy"	Trisha Yearwood	
August 10	"She's in Love with the Boy"	Trisha Yearwood	
August 17	"You Know Me Better Than That"	George Strait	
August 24	"You Know Me Better Than That"	George Strait	
August 31	"You Know Me Better Than That"	George Strait	
September 7	"Brand New Man"	Brooks & Dunn	
September 14	"Brand New Man"	Brooks & Dunn	
September 21	"Leap of Faith"	Lionel Cartwright	
September 28	"Where Are You Now"	Clint Black	
October 5	"Where Are You Now"	Clint Black	
October 12	"Keep It Between the Lines"	Ricky Van Shelton	
October 19	"Keep It Between the Lines"	Ricky Van Shelton	
October 26	"Anymore"	Travis Tritt	
November 2	"Anymore"	Travis Tritt	
November 9	"Someday"	Alan Jackson	
November 16	"Shameless"	Garth Brooks	
November 23	"Shameless"	Garth Brooks	
November 30	"Forever Together"	Randy Travis	
December 7	"For My Broken Heart"	Reba McEntire	
December 14	"For My Broken Heart"	Reba McEntire	
December 21	"My Next Broken Heart"	Brooks & Dunn	
December 28	"My Next Broken Heart"	Brooks & Dunn	

== See also ==
- 1991 in music
- List of artists who reached number one on the U.S. country chart
