= Oh What a Beautiful World =

Studio album by Willie Nelson
- Released: April 25, 2025
- Studio: East Iris (Nashville); Blackbird (Nashville)
- Genre: Country
- Length: 47:00
- Label: Legacy
- Producer: Buddy Cannon

Willie Nelson chronology
Last Leaf on the Tree (2024)	Oh What a Beautiful World (2025)	Workin' Man (2025)

Singles from Oh What a Beautiful World
- 1. "Oh What a Beautiful World" Released: April 12, 2025

Oh What a Beautiful World is the 77th solo studio album by American singer-songwriter Willie Nelson. It was released on April 25, 2025, through Legacy Recordings. Produced by Buddy Cannon, the album contains twelve songs written or co-written by Rodney Crowell, who performs harmony vocals on the lead single and title track. The album was nominated for the Grammy Award for Best Traditional Country Album at the 68th Annual Grammy Awards.

== Background ==
Nelson's first studio recording of a Crowell song came with "'Til I Gain Control Again" on the 1983 Waylon Jennings duet album Take It to the Limit, although he had previously performed the song in concert as on the 1978 album Willie and Family Live. Over the next four decades, Nelson continued to record Crowell songs (prominently on 2024 album The Border) and he personally chose the twelve songs for this album.

== Critical reception ==
Professional ratings
Review scores
Source	Rating
Mojo	4/5 stars
Pitchfork	6.8/10

No Depression praised the "radiant" album and Nelson's performances of Crowell's "emotionally resonant" songs." Hot Press noted that "Crowell's canon mines classic Nelson territory", adding that the album is "a splendid record."

== Track listing ==
Oh What A Beautiful World track listing
No.	Title	Writer(s)	Length
1.	"What Kind of Love"	Rodney Crowell; Roy Orbison; Will Jennings	3:41
2.	"Banks of the Old Bandera"	Crowell	3:26
3.	"The Fly Boy & The Kid"	Crowell	3:51
4.	"Forty Miles From Nowhere"	Crowell	4:28
5.	"I Wouldn't Be Me Without You"	Crowell	3:56
6.	"Making Memories of Us"	Crowell	4:11
7.	"Oh What a Beautiful World" (featuring Rodney Crowell)	Crowell	4:00
8.	"Open Season On My Heart"	Crowell; James T. Slater	3:52
9.	"Shame on the Moon"	Crowell	4:27
10.	"She's Back In Town"	Crowell	3:21
11.	"Still Learning How to Fly"	Crowell	4:00
12.	"Stuff That Works"	Crowell; Guy Clark	4:00
Total length:			47:15

== Personnel ==
Credits adapted from Tidal.

- Willie Nelson – lead vocals, Trigger
- Wyatt Beard – background vocals
- Jim "Moose" Brown – organ, piano, Wurlitzer piano
- Buddy Cannon – production, background vocals
- Melonie Cannon – background vocals
- Tony Castle – mixing, engineering
- Rodney Crowell – lead and harmony vocals on "Oh What a Beautiful World"
- Fred Eltringham – drums, percussion
- Andrew Mendelson – mastering
- James Mitchell – electric guitar
- Mickey Raphael – harmonica
- Bobby Terry – acoustic guitar, electric guitar, steel guitar, additional engineering
- Michael Walter – engineering assistance
- Glenn Worf – bass guitar, double bass

== Charts ==
Chart performance for Oh What a Beautiful World
Chart (2025)	Peak position
Croatian International Albums (HDU)	4
Scottish Albums (OCC)	42
Swiss Albums (Schweizer Hitparade)	36
UK Albums Sales (OCC)	49
UK Americana Albums (OCC)	11
UK Country Albums (OCC)	1
US Top Album Sales (Billboard)	16
