= What Kind of Fool Am I =

What Kind of Fool Am I may refer to:

- "What Kind of Fool Am I?, a 1962 single by Sammy Davis Jr.
- "What Kind of Fool Am I" (Rick Springfield song), a 1982 single by Rick Springfield

== See also ==
- What Kind of Fool (disambiguation)
