= Nobody Knows Me Like You =

Nobody Knows Me Like You may refer to:

- Nobody Knows Me Like You, a 1981 album by American Christian singer-songwriter Benny Hester that also contains the song of the same name
- "Nobody Knows Me Like You", a 2004 song by American country music singer-songwriter Phil Vassar from his album Shaken Not Stirred
- "Nobody Knows Me Like You", a 2024 song by American country music singer-songwriter Willie Nelson from his album The Border
