= What Kind of Fool (disambiguation) =

"What Kind of Fool" is a 1981 vocal duet between Barbra Streisand and Barry Gibb.

What Kind of Fool may also refer to:

- "What Kind of Fool" (Lionel Cartwright song), a 1991 song by Lionel Cartwright
- "What Kind of Fool (Heard All That Before)", a 1992 song performed by Kylie Minogue
- "What Kind of Fool Am I?", a 1962 song recorded by several artists
- "What Kind of Fool (Do You Think I Am)", a 1964 song by The Tamms
- "What Kind of Fool Do You Think I Am", a 1992 song by Lee Roy Parnell
- "What Kind of Fool", a 1988 single by All About Eve
