= Lionel Cartwright (album) =

Studio album by Lionel Cartwright
- Released: March 6, 1989
- Recorded: August–November 1988
- Studio: Sound Stage Studios (Nashville, Tennessee)
- Genre: Country
- Length: 34:18
- Label: MCA
- Producer: Tony Brown Steuart Smith

Lionel Cartwright chronology
Lionel Cartwright (1989)	I Watched It on the Radio (1990)

Singles from Lionel Cartwright
- 1. "You're Gonna Make Her Mine" Released: October 1988; 2. "Like Father Like Son" Released: February 18, 1989; 3. "Give Me His Last Chance" Released: June 5, 1989; 4. "In My Eyes" Released: October 2, 1989

Lionel Cartwright is the debut studio album by American country music singer Lionel Cartwright. It was released in March 1989 (see 1989 in country music) on MCA Records. The album includes the singles "You're Gonna Make Her Mine", "Like Father, Like Son", "Give Me His Last Chance" and "In My Eyes". These latter three singles all charted in the Top 40 on the Billboard country singles charts.

Dan Cooper of Allmusic rated the album four-and-a-half stars out of five, saying that out of Cartwright's three albums, it was "still his best."

== Track listing ==
All songs written by Lionel Cartwright except "Like Father Like Son", written by Paul Overstreet and Don Schlitz.

No.	Title	Length
1.	"Fallin' Again"	3:29
2.	"Like Father Like Son"	3:28
3.	"You're Gonna Make Her Mine"	2:32
4.	"A Little Lesser Blue"	3:17
5.	"In My Eyes"	4:14
6.	"Give Me His Last Chance"	4:12
7.	"That's Why They Call It Falling"	2:57
8.	"Blue Fiddle Waltz"	3:26
9.	"She Never Saw Love"	3:23
10.	"Let the Hard Times Roll"	3:20

== Chart performance ==
Chart (1989)	Peak position
U.S. Billboard Top Country Albums	44

=== Singles ===
Year	Single	Peak positions	
Year	Single	US Country	CAN Country
1988	"You're Gonna Make Her Mine"	45	—
1989	"Like Father Like Son"	14	21
1989	"Give Me His Last Chance"	3	7
1989	"In My Eyes"	12	6
"—" denotes releases that did not chart

== Personnel ==
As listed in liner notes.

- Lionel Cartwright – vocals, backing vocals, acoustic piano, keyboards, acoustic guitar, mandolin, fiddle
- John Barlow Jarvis – acoustic piano, keyboards
- Matt Rollings – acoustic piano, keyboards
- Steuart Smith – acoustic piano, keyboards, electric guitars, acoustic guitar
- Pat Flynn – acoustic guitar
- Steve Gibson – electric guitars
- Mac McAnally – acoustic guitar, backing vocals
- Paul Franklin – steel guitar, pedabro
- Mark O'Connor – mandolin, viola
- David Hungate – bass
- Michael Rhodes – bass
- Tom Robb – bass
- Eddie Bayers – drums
- Harry Stinson – drums, backing vocals
- Vince Gill – backing vocals

=== Production ===
- Tony Brown – producer
- Steuart Smith – producer
- Chuck Ainlay – recording, overdub recording, mixing
- Bob Bullock – recording, overdub recording, mixing
- Mark Coddington – overdub recording, second engineer
- John Guess – mixing
- Julian King – second engineer
- Tim Kish – second engineer
- Russ Martin – second engineer
- Milan Bogdan – digital editing
- Glenn Meadows – mastering
- Masterfonics (Nashville, Tennessee) – editing and mastering location
- Andy Byrd – pre-production
- Jessie Noble – project coordinator
- Simon Levy – art direction
- Tal Howell – design
- Glenn Hall – photography
