= Give Me His Last Chance =

Single by Lionel Cartwright

from the album Lionel Cartwright
- B-side: "Let the Hard Times Roll"
- Released: June 5, 1989
- Genre: Country
- Length: 4:12
- Label: MCA
- Songwriter: Lionel Cartwright
- Producers: Tony Brown, Steuart Smith

Lionel Cartwright singles chronology
"Like Father Like Son" (1989)	"Give Me His Last Chance" (1989)	"In My Eyes" (1989)

"Give Me His Last Chance" is a song written and recorded by American country music artist Lionel Cartwright. It was released in June 1989 as the third single from the album Lionel Cartwright. The song reached number three on the Billboard Hot Country Singles & Tracks chart.

== Music video ==
The music video was directed by Stephen Buck and premiered in mid 1989.

== Chart performance ==
"Give Me His Last Chance" debuted on the U.S. Billboard Hot Country Singles & Tracks for the week of June 17, 1989.

Chart (1989)	Peak position
Canada Country Singles (RPM)	7
US Hot Country Songs (Billboard)	3

=== Year-end charts ===
Chart (1989)	Position
Canada Country Tracks (RPM)	59
US Country Songs (Billboard)	28
