= Last Leaf on the Tree =

Studio album by Willie Nelson
- Released: November 1, 2024
- Studios: Hen House (Venice, Los Angeles); Pedernales Recording (Spicewood, Texas)
- Genre: Country
- Length: 51:23
- Label: Legacy
- Producer: Micah Nelson

Willie Nelson chronology
The Border (2024)	Last Leaf on the Tree (2024)	Oh What a Beautiful World (2025)

Singles from Last Leaf
- 1. "Last Leaf" Released: August 15, 2024; 2. "Do You Realize??" Released: September 19, 2024; 3. "Lost Cause" Released: October 25, 2024

Last Leaf on the Tree is the 76th solo studio album by American singer-songwriter Willie Nelson. It was released on November 1, 2024, through Legacy Recordings. Produced and curated by Micah Nelson, the album contains songs from songwriters such as Beck, Tom Waits, Neil Young and Nina Simone, a new version of Nelson's 1962 song "The Ghost" and an original song ("The Color of Sound") cowritten by Willie and Micah Nelson. Micah Nelson identified the through-line of the album as "facing death with grace". The album was nominated for the Grammy Award for Best Americana Album at the 68th Annual Grammy Awards.

The album's lead single and title track, a cover of Tom Waits's song "Last Leaf" from the 2011 album Bad as Me, was released on August 15, 2024. The album's second single, a cover of The Flaming Lips' song "Do You Realize??", from their 2002 album Yoshimi Battles the Pink Robots, was released on September 19, 2024. The third single, a cover of Beck's "Lost Cause" from his 2002 album Sea Change, was released on October 25, 2024.

== Background ==
Nelson's manager Mark Rothbaum first suggested that Micah Nelson should produce an album for his father. Micah Nelson took the minimalist production of Spirit as the starting point for the sound of the album, which was initially conceived as a Tom Waits tribute album before expanding in scope. Texas Monthly described the album as "the closest thing to a true Trigger record since 2013’s Let’s Face the Music and Dance"; Micah Nelson aimed for the iconic guitar "to be the lead character". Last Leaf on the Tree ends with a hidden track, "Looking for Trouble", described by Micah Nelson as "a very unserious moment."

== Critical reception ==
Professional ratings
Aggregate scores
Source	Rating
Metacritic	84/100
Review scores
Source	Rating
AllMusic	4/5 stars
The Arts Desk	5/5 stars
FT	4/5 stars
i	4/5 stars

Last Leaf on the Tree received positive reviews from music critics. At Metacritic, which assigns a normalized rating out of 100 to reviews from mainstream critics, the album received a score of 84 out of 100 based on four reviews, indicating "universal acclaim".

Tim Cumming at The Arts Desk found Last Leaf on the Tree to be "on a higher level" than Nelson's "excellent" previous album, The Border, praising Nelson's voice and guitar work, the production and choice of material. No Depression concluded that "On Last Leaf on the Tree, Willie Nelson is still doing what he’s always done best: interpreting the songs of others and writing his own memorable melodies."

== Track listing ==
Last Leaf on the Tree track listing
No.	Title	Writer(s)	Length
1.	"Last Leaf"	Kathleen Brennan; Tom Waits	3:14
2.	"If It Wasn't Broken"	Sydney Lyndella Ward	3:23
3.	"Lost Cause"	Beck David Hansen	3:32
4.	"Come Ye"	Nina Simone	3:34
5.	"Keep Me in Your Heart"	Jorge Calderón; Warren Zevon	3:35
6.	"Robbed Blind"	Keith Richards	4:03
7.	"House Where Nobody Lives"	Waits	4:10
8.	"Are You Ready for the Country?"	Neil Young	3:46
9.	"Do You Realize??"	Wayne Coyne; Steven Drozd; Michael Ivins; David Fridmann	3:11
10.	"Wheels"	Micah Nelson	3:25
11.	"Broken Arrow" ( (Note: Contains a snippet of "Mr. Soul"))	Young	6:40
12.	"Color of Sound"	Willie Nelson; M. Nelson	3:39
13.	"The Ghost" (includes hidden track (Note: "The Ghost" ends at 3:30, followed by hidden track "Looking for Trouble", which starts at 3:45.))	W. Nelson	5:11
Total length:			51:23

== Personnel ==
Musicians

- Aroyn Davis – bass (track 11)
- John Densmore – percussion (tracks 1, 2, 6, 9)
- Sam Gendel – alto saxophone (tracks 4, 10, 11), recorder (12)
- Daniel Lanois – pedal steel guitar (track 13)
- Micah Nelson – acoustic guitar (tracks 1–9, 11–13), piano (1–3, 7, 11), surdo (1, 2, 4, 6, 7, 9, 11), percussion (1, 2, 4, 6, 9, 11), cello (1, 3, 7, 9, 11), steel guitar (1, 6), background vocals (2, 3, 5–11, 13); bass, drums (2, 3, 5–9, 13); electric guitar (3, 4–7, 9, 11, 13), clapping (4, 8, 10), dulcimer (5), synthesizer (6, 10), slide guitar (8), Mellotron (13)
- Willie Nelson – lead vocals, Trigger
- Mickey Raphael – harmonica (tracks 1–9, 13), jaw harp (8)
- Kevin Smith – double bass (track 1)
- Nikita Sorokin – violin (tracks 2, 5, 9), fiddle (8)
- Magatte Sow – drums (track 4)
- Harlan Steinberger – clapping (track 4)
- Jeremy Steinberger – clapping (track 4)

Technical

- Steve Chadie – recording
- Emily Lazar – mastering
- Brando Marius – engineering
- Micah Nelson – production, mixing, recording, album art
- Mickey Raphael – engineering
- Harlan Steinberger – mixing, recording
- Randi Steinberger – photos

== Charts ==
Chart performance for Last Leaf on the Tree
Chart (2024)	Peak position
Austrian Albums (Ö3 Austria)	63
Scottish Albums (Official Charts)	14
Swiss Albums (Schweizer Hitparade)	37
UK Albums Sales (OCC)	23
UK Americana Albums (Official Charts)	5
UK Country Albums (Official Charts)	1
US Americana/Folk Albums (Billboard)	16
US Top Album Sales (Billboard)	11
US Top Country Albums (Billboard)	40
