= Now That We're Alone =

Single by Rodney Crowell

from the album Keys to the Highway
- B-side: "I Guess We've Been Together for Too Long"
- Released: October 20, 1990
- Genre: Country
- Length: 4:14
- Label: Columbia
- Songwriter: Rodney Crowell
- Producers: Tony Brown, Rodney Crowell

Rodney Crowell singles chronology
| "My Past Is Present" (1990) | "Now That We're Alone" (1990) | "Things I Wish I'd Said" (1991) |

"Now That We're Alone" is a song written and recorded by American country music artist Rodney Crowell. It was released in October 1990 as the fourth single from the album Keys to the Highway. The song reached number 17 on the Billboard Hot Country Singles & Tracks chart.

== Chart performance ==
| Chart (1990–1991) | Peak position |
|---|---|
| Canada Country Singles (RPM) | 13 |
| US Hot Country Songs (Billboard) | 17 |
