= The Chill of an Early Fall =

Single by George Strait

from the album Chill of an Early Fall
- B-side: "Her Only Bad Habit Is Me"
- Released: September 23, 1991
- Recorded: September 24, 1990
- Genre: Country
- Length: 3:29 (album version); 3:16 (single edit)
- Label: MCA 54180
- Songwriters: Green Daniel; Gretchen Peters
- Producers: Jimmy Bowen; George Strait

George Strait singles chronology
"You Know Me Better Than That" (1991)	"The Chill of an Early Fall" (1991)	"Lovesick Blues" (1992)

"The Chill of an Early Fall" is a song written by Green Daniel and Gretchen Peters and recorded by American country music artist George Strait. It was released in September 1991 as the third single from his album Chill of an Early Fall. The song reached number 3 on the Billboard Hot Country Singles & Tracks chart in December 1991. Joe Barnhill previously recorded the song on his 1990 self-titled debut album.

== Content ==
The narrator is a man who knows that his lover has been with a guy before or perhaps cheated in the past. He feels the chill of an early fall when he thinks about it and when her "old friend" comes around. The question of whether the other man is just a friend or more torments the narrator and drives him to drink.

== Chart performance ==
"The Chill of an Early Fall" debuted at number 57 on the U.S. Billboard Hot Country Singles & Tracks for the week of October 5, 1991.

Chart (1991)	Peak position
Canada Country Singles (RPM)	2
US Hot Country Songs (Billboard)	3

=== Year-end charts ===
Chart (1991)	Position
Canada Country Tracks (RPM)	77
