= Like Father Like Son (song) =

Single by Lionel Cartwright

from the album Lionel Cartwright
- B-side: "A Little Lesser Blue"
- Released: February 18, 1989
- Genre: Country
- Length: 3:28
- Label: MCA
- Songwriters: Paul Overstreet, Don Schlitz
- Producers: Tony Brown, Steuart Smith

Lionel Cartwright singles chronology
"You're Gonna Make Her Mine" (1988)	"Like Father Like Son" (1989)	"Give Me His Last Chance" (1989)

"Like Father Like Son" is a song written by Paul Overstreet and Don Schlitz, and recorded by American country music artist Lionel Cartwright. It was released in February 1989 as the second single from the album Lionel Cartwright. The song reached number 14 on the Billboard Hot Country Singles & Tracks chart, and was Cartwright's first Top 40 hit.

== Chart performance ==
Chart (1989)	Peak position
Canada Country Singles (RPM)	21
US Hot Country Songs (Billboard)	14
