= Chasin' the Sun =

Studio album by Lionel Cartwright
- Released: August 31, 1991
- Recorded: Early 1991
- Studio: Digital Recorders, The Doghouse, The Money Pit, Nightingale Studios, Treasure Isle Recorders, and Warner/Chappell Studios (Nashville, Tennessee)
- Genre: Country
- Length: 34:36
- Label: MCA
- Producer: Barry Beckett; Tony Brown; Andy Byrd; Lionel Cartwright; Ed Seay; Harry Stinson

Lionel Cartwright chronology
I Watched It on the Radio (1990)	Chasin' the Sun (1991)

Chasin' the Sun is the third studio album by American country music singer and songwriter Lionel Cartwright. It was released on August 31, 1991, via MCA Records. It contains his only number one single, "Leap of Faith." Two other singles released from the album, "What Kind of Fool" and "Family Tree," charted at numbers 24 and 62 respectively.

Professional ratings
Review scores
Source	Rating
AllMusic	3/5 stars
Chicago Tribune	3.5/4 stars
Christgau's Consumer Guide	(choice cut)

== Track listing ==
All songs written by Lionel Cartwright except where noted.

No.	Title	Writer(s)	Length
1.	"Waitin' for the Sun to Shine"	Sonny Throckmorton	3:31
2.	"Susannah"	Gretchen Peters	3:05
3.	"30 Nothin"		3:35
4.	"What Kind of Fool"		3:51
5.	"When You Cross That Line"	Steve Bogard, Rick Giles	3:10
6.	"I'm Your Man"		2:38
7.	"Smack Dab in the Middle of Love"		3:07
8.	"Family Tree"		3:30
9.	"Great Expectations"		4:06
10.	"Leap of Faith"		4:03

== Release history ==
Year	Type	Label	Catalogue
1991	Cassette	MCA	MCAC-10307
1991	CD	MCA	MCAD-10307

== Chart performance ==
Chart (1991)	Peak position
U.S. Billboard Top Country Albums	27
U.S. Billboard 200	170

== Personnel ==
As listed in liner notes.

Musicians

- Lionel Cartwright – vocals, acoustic piano (4, 8, 9), acoustic guitar (6–8), mandolin (5)
- Mike Lawler – keyboards (2, 10)
- Matt Rollings – acoustic piano (2, 10)
- John Jorgenson – acoustic guitar (1, 3, 4, 9), acoustic guitar solo (1), mandolin (1, 4), electric guitars (3, 4)
- John Willis – acoustic guitar (1, 3, 4), electric guitars (9), gut string guitar (9)
- George Marinelli – electric guitar (2, 10)
- Don Potter – acoustic guitar (2, 10)
- Chris Leuzinger – electric guitars (5, 6, 8)
- Biff Watson – acoustic guitar (5, 6, 8)
- Bob Britt – electric guitar (7)
- Mac McAnally – acoustic guitar (9)
- Buddy Emmons – steel guitar (1, 3)
- Paul Franklin – steel guitar (2, 10)
- Weldon Myrick – steel guitar (4, 9)
- Greg Trostle – steel guitar (5, 7)
- Jerry Douglas – dobro (6, 8)
- Mike Brignardello – bass (1, 3, 4, 9)
- Michael Rhodes – bass (2, 10)
- Glenn Worf – bass (5, 6, 8)
- Dale Jarvis – bass (7)
- Harry Stinson – drums (1, 3, 4, 9), percussion (4)
- Eddie Bayers – drums (2, 5, 6, 8, 10)
- Alex Torrez – drums (7)
- Glen Duncan – fiddle (6)
- Paul Kramer – fiddle (7)

Background and Harmony vocalists

- Mac McAnally – backing vocals (1, 9), harmony vocals (4)
- Jim Photoglo – backing vocals (1)
- Ricky Skaggs – backing vocals (1), harmony vocals (1)
- Alison Krauss – harmony vocals (2)
- Harry Stinson – harmony vocals (2, 4), backing vocals (3, 9, 10)
- Russell Smith – backing vocals (3)
- Marty Brown – harmony vocals (5, 7)
- Lionel Cartwright – harmony vocals (7)
- Doug Clements – backing vocals (8)
- Lewis Nunley – backing vocals (8)
- Judy Rodman – backing vocals (8)
- Karen Taylor-Good – backing vocals (8)
- George Marinelli – backing vocals (10)
- Hershey Reeves – backing vocals (10), harmony vocals (10)

== Production ==
- Ed Seay – producer (1, 3, 4, 9)
- Harry Stinson – producer (1, 3, 4, 9)
- Barry Beckett – producer (2, 10)
- Tony Brown – producer (2, 10)
- Andy Byrd – producer (5–8)
- Lionel Cartwright – producer (5–8)
- Anthony Martin – additional production assistance (1, 3, 4, 9)
- Katherine DeVault – art direction, design
- Jim "Señor" McGuire – photography
- Noel Fox – management

Technical credits

- Denny Purcell – mastering at Georgetown Masters (Nashville, Tennessee)
- Ed Seay – engineer (1, 3, 4, 9)
- Marshall Morgan – mixing (1, 3–9), engineer (5–8)
- Mike Clute – engineer (2, 10)
- John Guess – mixing (2, 10)
- Andy Byrd – engineer (5–8)
- Mike Poole – second engineer (1, 3, 4, 9)
- Ed Simonton – second engineer (1, 3, 4, 9)
- Douglas Edwards – second engineer (2, 10)
- Marty Williams – second mix engineer (2, 10)
- Christy Follmar – second engineer (5–8)
- Brad Jones – second engineer (5–8)
- John Kunz – second engineer (5–8)
- Chad Shearer – second engineer (5–8)
