= Keep It in the Middle of the Road =

Single by Exile

from the album Still Standing
- B-side: "Yet"
- Released: December 16, 1989
- Genre: Country
- Length: 3:18
- Label: Arista
- Songwriters: J.P. Pennington, Sonny LeMaire
- Producers: Randy Sharp, Tim DuBois

Exile singles chronology
"It's You Again" (1988)	"Keep It in the Middle of the Road" (1989)	"Nobody's Talking" (1990)

Music video
- "Keep It in the Middle of the Road" on YouTube

"Keep It in the Middle of the Road" is a song written by J.P. Pennington and Sonny LeMaire, and recorded by American country music group Exile. It was released in December 1989 as the first single from the album Still Standing. The song reached number 17 on the Billboard Hot Country Singles & Tracks chart.

== Composition ==
The song is in the key of G major with a "bright country shuffle" beat. The main chord pattern is G7♯9-C7-C♯dim7-G-D7-D7♯9-G.

== Critical reception ==
An uncredited review in Billboard was positive, stating that "Hot guitar and piano licks strike like lightning throughout this lively, tightly performed number."

== Chart performance ==
Chart (1989–1990)	Peak position
Canada Country Singles (RPM)	19
US Hot Country Songs (Billboard)	17
