= Keys to the Highway =

Studio album by Rodney Crowell
- Released: October 10, 1989
- Studio: Emerald Sound Studios, Sound Stage Studios, Nashville, TN
- Genre: Country
- Length: 43:12
- Label: Columbia
- Producer: Rodney Crowell; Tony Brown

Rodney Crowell chronology
The Rodney Crowell Collection (1989)	Keys to the Highway (1989)	Life Is Messy (1992)

Singles from Keys to the Highway
- 1. "Many a Long and Lonesome Highway" Released: September 1989; 2. "If Looks Could Kill" Released: January 1990; 3. "My Past Is Present" Released: July 14, 1990; 4. "Now That We're Alone" Released: October 20, 1990; 5. "Things I Wish I'd Said" Released: January 1991

Professional ratings
Review scores
Source	Rating
AllMusic	3.5/5 stars
Chicago Tribune	3/4 stars
Los Angeles Times	3/5 stars

Keys to the Highway is the sixth studio album by American country music artist Rodney Crowell, released in 1989 by Columbia Records (see 1989 in country music). It peaked at number 15 on the Top Country Albums chart. The songs, "Many a Long & Lonesome Highway", "If Looks Could Kill", "My Past Is Present", "Now That We're Alone" and "Things I Wish I'd Said" were released as singles. The last single failed to reach the top 40.

== Track listing ==
All songs written by Rodney Crowell except when noted

No.	Title	Writer(s)	Length
1.	"My Past Is Present"	Crowell, Steuart Smith	2:49
2.	"If Looks Could Kill"		3:25
3.	"Soul Searchin'"		3:57
4.	"Many a Long & Lonesome Highway"	Crowell, Will Jennings	4:16
5.	"We Gotta Go on Meeting Like This"	Crowell, Larry Willoughby	2:54
6.	"The Faith Is Mine"		4:29
7.	"Tell Me the Truth"	Crowell, Jim Hanson, Vince Santoro, Smith	3:35
8.	"Don't Let Your Feet Slow You Down"		3:18
9.	"Now That We're Alone"		4:14
10.	"Things I Wish I'd Said"		4:08
11.	"I Guess We've Been Together for Too Long"	Guy Clark, Crowell	2:46
12.	"You Been on My Mind"		3:28

== Personnel ==
The Dixie Pearls

- Eddie Bayers – drums
- Barry Beckett – piano, organ
- Rodney Crowell – lead vocals, acoustic guitar
- Hank DeVito – steel guitar, acoustic guitar
- Paul Franklin – steel guitar
- Jim Hanson – bass guitar, background vocals
- Michael Rhodes – bass guitar
- Vince Santoro – drums, background vocals
- Steuart Smith – electric guitar, acoustic guitar

Guest musicians

- Rosanne Cash – background vocals
- Ashley Cleveland – background vocals
- Vince Gill – background vocals
- Mark O'Connor – fiddle, mandolin
- Harry Stinson – background vocals

Technical

- Tony Brown – production
- Donivan Coward – overdubbing
- Rodney Crowell – production, arrangement
- The Dixie Pearls – arrangement
- John Guess – mixing
- Glen Hardin – orchestra arrangement, conduction
- Steve Marcantonio – engineering, mixing
- Glenn Meadows – mastering
- Steuart Smith – arrangement

== Chart performance ==
=== Weekly charts ===
Chart (1989–1990)	Peak position
US Billboard 200	180
US Top Country Albums (Billboard)	15

=== Year-end charts ===
Chart (1990)	Position
US Top Country Albums (Billboard)	30

=== Singles ===
Year	Single	Peak positions	
Year	Single	US Country	CAN Country
1989	"Many a Long and Lonesome Highway"	3	1
1990	"If Looks Could Kill"	6	4
1990	"My Past Is Present"	22	12
1990	"'Now That We're Alone"	17	13
1991	"Things I Wish I'd Said"	72	—
