= Say It's Not True (Lionel Cartwright song) =

Single by Lionel Cartwright

from the album I Watched It on the Radio
- B-side: "In the Long Run"
- Released: December 1, 1990
- Genre: Country
- Length: 4:13
- Label: MCA
- Songwriter(s): Lionel Cartwright
- Producer(s): Steuart Smith, Tony Brown

Lionel Cartwright singles chronology
"My Heart Is Set on You" (1990)	"Say It's Not True" (1990)	"Leap of Faith" (1991)

"Say It's Not True" is a song written and recorded by American country music artist Lionel Cartwright. It was released in December 1990 as the third single from the album I Watched It on the Radio. The song reached #31 on the Billboard Hot Country Singles & Tracks chart.

== Chart performance ==
Chart (1990–1991)	Peak position
US Hot Country Songs (Billboard)	31
Canadian RPM Country Tracks	29
