= Chill of an Early Fall =

Studio album by George Strait
- Released: March 19, 1991
- Recorded: September 1990
- Studio: Emerald Studios and Sound Stage Studios (Nashville, TN).
- Genre: Neotraditional country; honky-tonk; Texas country
- Length: 31:03
- Label: MCA
- Producer: Jimmy Bowen; George Strait

George Strait chronology
Livin' It Up (1990)	Chill of an Early Fall (1991)	Ten Strait Hits (1991)

Singles from Chill of an Early Fall
- 1. "If I Know Me" Released: March 12, 1991; 2. "You Know Me Better Than That" Released: June 11, 1991; 3. "The Chill of an Early Fall" Released: September 23, 1991; 4. "Lovesick Blues" Released: January 7, 1992

Professional ratings
Review scores
Source	Rating
AllMusic	3/5 stars
Chicago Tribune	4/4 stars
Entertainment Weekly	A+
Los Angeles Times	3/5 stars
Q	4/5 stars

Chill of an Early Fall is the eleventh studio album by American country music artist George Strait. It was released by MCA Records. The album produced the singles "If I Know Me" and "You Know Me Better Than That", both of which reached Number One on the Billboard Hot Country Singles & Tracks (now Hot Country Songs) charts in 1991. Also released from this album were the title track (#3 on the country charts) and a cover of Hank Williams' "Lovesick Blues" (#24), Strait's first single since "Down and Out" in 1981 to miss Top Ten.

The title song was previously recorded by Joe Barnhill on his 1990 self-titled debut album. "Her Only Bad Habit Is Me" was recorded by Ty England on his 1995 self-titled debut.

== Track listing ==
No.	Title	Writer(s)	Length
1.	"The Chill of an Early Fall"	Green Daniel, Gretchen Peters	3:29
2.	"I've Convinced Everybody but Me"	Buddy Cannon, L. David Lewis, Kim Williams	3:19
3.	"If I Know Me"	Pam Belford, Dean Dillon	2:42
4.	"You Know Me Better Than That"	Anna Lisa Graham, Tony Haselden	3:01
5.	"Anything You Can Spare"	Harlan Howard	2:18
6.	"Home in San Antone"	Floyd Jenkins	2:24
7.	"Lovesick Blues"	Cliff Friend, Irving Mills	2:55
8.	"Milk Cow Blues"	Kokomo Arnold	4:51
9.	"Her Only Bad Habit Is Me"	Don Cook, Howard	3:17
10.	"Is It Already Time"	Aaron Barker	2:47

== Personnel ==
- George Strait – lead vocals, acoustic guitar
- Floyd Domino – acoustic piano
- Steve Gibson – acoustic guitar
- Brent Rowan – electric guitars
- Paul Franklin – steel guitar
- Joe Chemay – bass
- Larrie Londin – drums
- Johnny Gimble – fiddle
- Jim Horn – saxophone
- Liana Manis – backing vocals
- Curtis Young – backing vocals

Ace in the Hole Band On "Home in San Antone", "Lovesick Blues" and "Milk Cow Blues".

- George Strait – vocals, acoustic guitar
- Ronnie Huckaby – acoustic piano
- David Anthony – acoustic guitar
- Benny McArthur – electric guitars
- Rick McRae – electric guitars
- Mike Daily – steel guitar
- Terry Hale – bass
- Phil Fisher – drums
- Gene Elders – fiddle

=== Production ===
- Jimmy Bowen – producer
- George Strait – producer
- Bob Bullock – recording
- Tim Kish – recording, mixing
- Chuck Ainlay – mixing
- David Boyer – second engineer
- Russ Martin – second engineer
- Milan Bogdan – digital editing
- Glenn Meadows – mastering
- Masterfonics (Nashville, Tennessee) – editing and mastering location
- Jessie Noble – project coordinator
- Jim Kemp – art direction
- Katherine DeVault – art direction, design
- Mike Rutherford – photography
- Erv Woolsey – management

== Charts ==
=== Weekly charts ===
Chart (1991)	Peak position
US Billboard 200	45
US Top Country Albums (Billboard)	4

=== Year-end charts ===
Chart (1991)	Position
US Top Country Albums (Billboard)	23
Chart (1992)	Position
US Top Country Albums (Billboard)	69

== Certifications ==
Certifications for Chill of an Early Fall
Region	Certification	Certified units/sales
United States (RIAA)	Platinum	1,000,000^{^}
^{^} Shipments figures based on certification alone.
