= Livin' It Up (album) =

Livin' it Up

Studio album by George Strait
- Released: May 15, 1990
- Recorded: February 1990
- Studio: Emerald Studios and Sound Stage Studios (Nashville, TN).
- Genre: Country
- Length: 30:39
- Label: MCA
- Producer: Jimmy Bowen, George Strait

George Strait chronology
Beyond the Blue Neon (1989)	Livin' it Up (1990)	Chill of an Early Fall (1991)

Singles from Livin' it Up
- 1. "Love Without End, Amen" Released: April 6, 1990; 2. "Drinking Champagne" Released: July 20, 1990; 3. "I've Come to Expect It from You" Released: October 22, 1990

Professional ratings
Review scores
Source	Rating
Chicago Tribune	3/4 stars

Livin' it Up is the tenth studio album by American country music singer George Strait, released in 1990 on MCA Records. It has been certified platinum by the RIAA. The tracks "Drinking Champagne", "Love Without End, Amen", and "I've Come to Expect It From You" were all released as singles; "Drinking Champagne" was a #4 hit on the Hot Country Songs charts, while the other two singles were both Number One hits. "She Loves Me (She Don't Love You)" was written and originally recorded by Conway Twitty, and was later recorded on Gary Allan's 1998 album It Would Be You.

"Lonesome Rodeo Cowboy" was first recorded by Strait and the Ace in the Hole Band in the 1970s and was the B-side to "(That Don't Change) The Way I Feel About You", the latter of which is included on Strait Out of the Box.

== Reception ==
NME said, "The grim new is that old George isn't inclined to shake anything too radical these days these days. Livin' It Up is awful schlock-heavy stuff - a spread of quality crooning, but a big zero on the sincerity metre. Pretty depressing, actually."

== Track listing ==
No.	Title	Writer(s)	Length
1.	"Someone Had to Teach You"	Harlan Howard	2:49
2.	"Heaven Must Be Wondering Where You Are"	David Chamberlain, L. David Lewis	3:13
3.	"I've Come to Expect It from You"	Buddy Cannon, Dean Dillon	3:45
4.	"Lonesome Rodeo Cowboy"	Clay Blaker	4:25
5.	"When You're a Man on Your Own"	Carl Perkins	2:12
6.	"Drinking Champagne"	Bill Mack	3:35
7.	"We're Supposed to Do that Now and Then"	David Anthony, Dillon, Joe Royer	2:33
8.	"She Loves Me (She Don't Love You)"	Conway Twitty	2:30
9.	"Love Without End, Amen"	Aaron Barker	3:07
10.	"Stranger in My Arms"	Curtis Wayne	2:54

== Personnel ==
- George Strait – lead vocals, acoustic guitar
- Floyd Domino – pianos
- Steve Gibson – acoustic guitars
- Reggie Young – electric guitars
- Paul Franklin – steel guitar
- Joe Chemay – bass
- Eddie Bayers – drums
- Johnny Gimble – fiddle
- Jim Horn – saxophone
- Curtis Young – backing vocals
- Liana Young – backing vocals

=== Ace in the Hole Band ===
On "Someone Had to Teach You" and "She Loves Me (She Don't Love You)"

- Ronnie Huckaby – acoustic piano
- David Anthony – acoustic guitars
- Benny MacArthur – electric guitars
- Rick McRae – electric guitars
- Mike Daily – steel guitar
- Terry Hale – bass
- Phil Fisher – drums
- Gene Elders – fiddle

=== Production ===
- Jimmy Bowen – producer
- George Strait – producer
- Tom Perry – recording, mixing
- Bob Bullock – overdub recording, mixing
- Tim Kish – overdub recording
- Russ Martin – overdub recording, second engineer
- Julian King – second engineer
- Milan Bogdan – digital editing
- Glenn Meadows – mastering
- Masterfonics (Nashville, TN) – editing and mastering location
- Jessie Noble – project coordinator
- Jim Kemp – art direction
- Katherine DeVault – art direction, design
- Mike Rutherford – photography

== Charts ==
=== Weekly charts ===
Chart (1990)	Peak position
US Billboard 200	35
US Top Country Albums (Billboard)	1

=== Year-end charts ===
Chart (1990)	Position
US Top Country Albums (Billboard)	22
Chart (1991)	Position
US Top Country Albums (Billboard)	27

== Certifications ==
Region	Certification	Certified units/sales
United States (RIAA)	Platinum	1,000,000^{^}
^{^} Shipments figures based on certification alone.
