= Drinking Champagne =

Single by Cal Smith

from the album Drinking Champagne
- B-side: "Honky Tonk Blues"
- Released: September 1968
- Genre: Country
- Length: 2:40
- Label: Kapp
- Songwriter: Bill Mack
- Producer: Paul Cohen

Cal Smith singles chronology
"Jacksonville" (1968)	"Drinking Champagne" (1968)	"Empty Arms" (1969)

"Drinking Champagne"

Single by George Strait

from the album Livin' It Up
- B-side: "We're Supposed to Do That Now and Then"
- Released: July 20, 1990
- Recorded: February 12, 1990
- Genre: Country
- Length: 3:35
- Label: MCA 79070
- Songwriter: Bill Mack
- Producers: Jimmy Bowen; George Strait

George Strait singles chronology
"Love Without End, Amen" (1990)	"Drinking Champagne" (1990)	"I've Come to Expect It from You" (1990)

"Drinking Champagne" is a song written by Bill Mack. He released the first version of the song on Pike Records in the mid-sixties. The song grabbed nationwide attention when the version by Cal Smith reached #35 on the country music charts in 1968.

The tune also was a local hit in the late sixties by Hawaii's Myra English.

Jerry Lee Lewis released a version of the song on his 1973 album, Live at the International.

It was covered in 1990 by George Strait, whose version was the second single from his album Livin' It Up. The song reached #4 on the Billboard Hot Country Singles & Tracks chart in October 1990.

== Chart performance ==
=== Cal Smith ===
Chart (1968)	Peak position
US Hot Country Songs (Billboard)	35

=== George Strait ===
Chart (1990)	Peak position
Canada Country Singles (RPM)	3
US Hot Country Songs (Billboard)	4

==== Year-end charts ====
Chart (1990)	Position
Canada Country Tracks (RPM)	35
US Country Songs (Billboard)	72

== Other recordings ==
- Bill Mack 1967,
- Billy Walker 1968,
- Faron Young 1969,
- Ray Price 1969
- Jimmy Dallas (e.g. Keith Kissee) 1972
- Jim Ed Brown 1973
- Don Gibson 1973
- Mickey Gilley 1975,
- Dean Martin 1983
- Willie Nelson 2010
