= Errol Ranville =

Errol Ranville is a Canadian singer and guitarist. He is a founder of the Manito Ahbee (Ah-beh) Festival held in Winnipeg, Manitoba held annually. He was a member of the country band Freebird.

== Career ==
Ranville started a band called C-Weed and the Weeds with his brothers Wally and Don when they were in high school. The band was formed in 1984 and by 1986 had changed their name to C-Weed and released four albums.

In 1987, Ranville left the band and started his own project, Free Bird. Both bands continued to perform the C-Weed repertoire in the Winnipeg area, along with some new material.

In 2010, Ranville was injured in a serious car crash in which his wife Marcie & 4 others died. He was initially charged with careless driving, but later cleared of those charges.

He was presented with a Lifetime Achievement Award at the Aboriginal Peoples Choice Music Awards in 2011.

In 2017, a short film about Ranville's life was created by filmmaker Gary Zubeck. The film was shown at the Winnipeg Film Festival and aired on CBC Television.

In 2021, Ranville published a memoir entitled Run as One: My Story, published by Great Plains Press.
