= Columbia Country Classics =

Compilation album by various artists
- Released: 1990
- Recorded: (all selections previously released)
- Genre: Country
- Label: Columbia/Legacy

Allmusic reviews
Review scores
Source	Rating
Volume 1	5/5 stars
Volume 2	4.5/5 stars
Volume 3	4/5 stars
Volume 4	4.5/5 stars
Volume 5	3/5 stars

Columbia Country Classics was a multi-volume set of recordings released in 1990 by Legacy Recordings. The collection contains 128 tracks from the Columbia, Epic and associated recording labels, and covers a span from the mid-1930s through the late 1980s.

Columbia Country Classics was issued on either five compact discs or cassette tapes; for a time, customers could also purchase the series on vinyl albums. Each volume contained annotated essays covering the periods featured on each disc.

== The discs ==
The five discs covered a different era, as follows:

- "Vol. 1: The Golden Age" — Featuring country music's pioneers.
- "Vol. 2: Honky Tonk Heroes" — The golden age of honky tonk, from the late 1940s through early 1960s.
- "Vol. 3: Americana" — Covering folk, historical and saga songs.
- "Vol. 4: The Nashville Sound" — Chronicling the rise of country pop through the 1950s through mid-1970s.
- "Vol. 5: A New Tradition" — Alternative country and the rise of new traditionalists of the 1980s.

Significant artists whose works were included were the Carter Family, Sons of the Pioneers, Bob Wills, Roy Acuff, Johnny Cash, Ray Price, Willie Nelson, George Jones, Merle Haggard, Charlie Rich, Tanya Tucker, Statler Brothers and Larry Gatlin.
