= My Past Is Present =

Single by Rodney Crowell

from the album Keys to the Highway
- B-side: "You Been on My Mind"
- Released: July 14, 1990
- Genre: Country
- Length: 2:50
- Label: Columbia
- Songwriters: Rodney Crowell, Steuart Smith
- Producers: Tony Brown, Rodney Crowell

Rodney Crowell singles chronology
"If Looks Could Kill" (1990)	"My Past Is Present" (1990)	"Now That We're Alone" (1990)

"My Past Is Present" is a song co-written and recorded by American country music artist Rodney Crowell. It was released in July 1990 as the third single from the album Keys to the Highway. The song reached number 22 on the Billboard Hot Country Singles & Tracks chart. It was written by Crowell and Steuart Smith.

== Chart performance ==
Chart (1990)	Peak position
Canada Country Singles (RPM)	12
US Hot Country Songs (Billboard)	22
