= What Kind of Fool (Lionel Cartwright song) =

Single by Lionel Cartwright

from the album Chasin' the Sun
- B-side: "I'm Your Man"
- Released: November 16, 1991
- Genre: Country
- Length: 3:51
- Label: MCA
- Songwriter: Lionel Cartwright
- Producers: Harry Stinson, Ed Seay

Lionel Cartwright singles chronology
"Leap of Faith" (1991)	"What Kind of Fool" (1991)	"Family Tree" (1992)

"What Kind of Fool" is a song written and recorded by American country music artist Lionel Cartwright. It was released in November 1991 as the second single from the album Chasin' the Sun. The song reached number 24 on the Billboard Hot Country Singles & Tracks chart.

== Chart performance ==
Chart (1991–1992)	Peak position
Canada Country Singles (RPM)	19
US Hot Country Songs (Billboard)	24
