= Morris P. Rainville =

- Born: Maurice Rainville
- Origin: Sudbury, Ontario, Canada
- Genres: Country
- Occupation: Singer-songwriter
- Instrument: Vocals
- Years active: 1990–present
- Labels: Rarerabit

Morris P. Rainville, born Maurice Rainville, is a Canadian country music artist from Greater Sudbury. Morris is also part of a duo The Rainvilles with his spouse, Dot. Rainville's debut album, The Mississauga Man, was released in 1993. His 1990 single "Always Hum a Song in Your Soul" reached the Top 10 of the RPM Country Tracks chart.

== Discography ==
=== Albums ===
Year	Album	Label
1993	The Mississauga Man	Rarerabit

=== Singles ===
Year	Single	CAN Country	Album
1989	"Good Old Country Blues"	22	singles only
1990	"Always Hum a Song in Your Soul"	9	singles only
1990	"Born in the Country"	23	singles only
1991	"His Own Free Will"	24	singles only
1991	"Would a Been Here Much Sooner"	25	singles only
1992	"Dealers in Heartaches"	19	singles only
1993	"The Mississauga Man"	26	The Mississauga Man
1994	"Waiting Too Long"	34	The Mississauga Man
1994	"Tell Me Where You've Been"	40	The Mississauga Man
