= Nobody's Talking =

Single by Exile

from the album Still Standing
- B-side: "Don't Hang Up"
- Released: March 1990
- Genre: Country
- Length: 3:39
- Label: Arista
- Songwriters: Sonny LeMaire; Randy Sharp
- Producers: Randy Sharp, Tim DuBois

Exile singles chronology
"Keep It in the Middle of the Road" (1990)	"Nobody's Talking" (1990)	"Yet" (1990)

"Nobody's Talking" is a song written by Sonny LeMaire and Randy Sharp, and recorded by American country music group Exile. It was released in March 1990 as the second single from their album Still Standing. The song reached number 2 on the Billboard Hot Country Singles & Tracks chart in July 1990.

== Music video ==
The music video was directed by Jim May and premiered in early 1990.

== Chart performance ==
Chart (1990)	Peak position
Canada Country Singles (RPM)	3
US Hot Country Songs (Billboard)	2

=== Year-end charts ===
Chart (1990)	Position
Canada Country Tracks (RPM)	46
US Country Songs (Billboard)	59
