= Many a Long & Lonesome Highway =

Single by Rodney Crowell

from the album Keys to the Highway
- B-side: "I Know You're Married"
- Released: September 1989
- Genre: Country
- Length: 4:16
- Label: Columbia
- Songwriters: Rodney Crowell; Will Jennings
- Producers: Rodney Crowell; Tony Brown

Rodney Crowell singles chronology
| "Above and Beyond" (1989) | "Many a Long & Lonesome Highway" (1989) | "If Looks Could Kill" (1990) |

"Many a Long & Lonesome Highway" is a song co-written and recorded by American country music artist Rodney Crowell. It was released in September 1989 as the first single from Crowell's album Keys to the Highway. The song reached number 3 on the Billboard Hot Country Singles & Tracks chart in January 1990 and number 1 on the RPM Country Tracks chart in Canada. It was written by Crowell and Will Jennings. It was covered by Willie Nelson on his 2024 album The Border.

== Chart performance ==
| Chart (1989–1990) | Peak position |
|---|---|
| Canada Country Singles (RPM) | 1 |
| US Hot Country Songs (Billboard) | 3 |

=== Year-end charts ===
| Chart (1990) | Position |
|---|---|
| Canada Country Tracks (RPM) | 45 |
| US Country Songs (Billboard) | 47 |
