= My Heart Is Set on You =

Single by Lionel Cartwright

from the album I Watched It on the Radio
- B-side: "True Believer"
- Released: July 28, 1990
- Genre: Country
- Length: 3:13
- Label: MCA
- Songwriter: Lionel Cartwright
- Producers: Tony Brown, Steuart Smith

Lionel Cartwright singles chronology
"I Watched It All (On My Radio)" (1990)	"My Heart Is Set on You" (1990)	"Say It's Not True" (1990)

"My Heart Is Set on You" is a song written and recorded by American country music artist Lionel Cartwright. It was released in July 1990 as the second single from the album I Watched It on the Radio. The song reached number seven on the Billboard Hot Country Singles & Tracks chart.

== Critical reception ==
Dan Herbeck of The Buffalo News compared Cartwright's sound to Ricky Skaggs, and said that the song was "a blatantly commercial but bouncy little song."

== Chart performance ==
Chart (1990)	Peak position
Canada Country Singles (RPM)	6
US Hot Country Songs (Billboard)	7

=== Year-end charts ===
Chart (1990)	Position
Canada Country Tracks (RPM)	72
