= If Looks Could Kill (Rodney Crowell song) =

Single by Rodney Crowell

from the album Keys to the Highway
- B-side: "I Didn't Know I Could Lose You"
- Released: January 1990
- Genre: Country
- Length: 3:25
- Label: Columbia
- Songwriter: Rodney Crowell
- Producers: Rodney Crowell; Tony Brown

Rodney Crowell singles chronology
"Many a Long & Lonesome Highway" (1989)	"If Looks Could Kill" (1990)	"My Past Is Present" (1990)

"If Looks Could Kill" is a song written and recorded by American country music artist Rodney Crowell. It was released in January 1990 as the second single from Crowell's album Keys to the Highway (1989). The song reached number 6 on the Billboard Hot Country Singles & Tracks chart in May 1990 and number 4 on the RPM Country Tracks chart in Canada.

== Chart performance ==
Chart (1990)	Peak position
Canada Country Singles (RPM)	4
US Hot Country Songs (Billboard)	6

=== Year-end charts ===
Chart (1990)	Position
Canada Country Tracks (RPM)	55
