= Leap of Faith (Lionel Cartwright song) =

Single by Lionel Cartwright

from the album Chasin' the Sun
- B-side: "Smack Dab in the Middle of Love"
- Released: June 24, 1991
- Genre: Country
- Length: 4:03
- Label: MCA
- Songwriter: Lionel Cartwright
- Producers: Barry Beckett; Tony Brown

Lionel Cartwright singles chronology
"Say It's Not True" (1990)	"Leap of Faith" (1991)	"What Kind of Fool" (1991)

"Leap of Faith" is a song written and recorded by American country music singer Lionel Cartwright. It was released in June 1991 as the first single from his album Chasin' the Sun. The song became his first and only number #1 country hit in September of that year.

== Critical reception ==
A Miami Herald review of the album said that the song showed Cartwright's more commercial and country pop oriented side, compared to the bluegrass and Cajun influences shown by the rest of the tracks. It was also referred to as a "radio programmer's dream" in the same review.

== Music video ==
The music video was directed by John Lloyd Miller and premiered in mid-1991.

== Personnel ==
As listed in liner notes.

- Eddie Bayers – drums
- Paul Franklin – steel guitar
- Mike Lawler – keyboards
- George Marinelli – electric guitar
- Don Potter – acoustic guitar
- Hershey Reeves – background vocals
- Michael Rhodes – bass guitar
- Matt Rollings – piano
- Harry Stinson – background vocals

== Chart performance ==
"Leap of Faith" was Cartwright's only Number One hit, spending twenty weeks on Billboard Hot Country Singles & Tracks (now Hot Country Songs) and peaking on the chart week of September 21, 1991.

Chart (1991)	Peak position
Canada Country Singles (RPM)	3
US Hot Country Songs (Billboard)	1

=== Year-end charts ===
Chart (1991)	Position
Canada Country Tracks (RPM)	44
US Country Songs (Billboard)	28
