= Still Standing (Exile album) =

Studio album by Exile
- Released: February 14, 1990
- Recorded: 1989
- Studios: Digital Recorders, Midtone and Volume Studios, Omnisound Recording Studios, Sound Stage Studios, Nashville, TN
- Genre: Country
- Length: 35:58
- Label: Arista Nashville
- Producers: Randy Sharp, Tim DuBois

Exile chronology
Shelter from the Night (1987)	Still Standing (1990)	Justice (1991)

Still Standing is the eleventh studio album by American country pop group Exile. It was released on February 14, 1990, via Arista Nashville. The album includes the singles "Keep It in the Middle of the Road", "Nobody's Talking" "Yet" and "There You Go".

== History ==
In 1987, vocalist and guitarist Les Taylor departed Exile, with multi-instrumentalist Paul Martin replacing him soon afterward. Co-lead vocalist J.P. Pennington departed shortly after Martin's joining, citing burnout and personality conflicts with Martin. As a result, Martin was promoted to lead vocalist in 1989. The departures of Taylor and Pennington led Epic Records to drop the band at the end of the 1980s. Despite this, Exile continued to tour. Mark Jones, a friend of then-keyboardist Lee Carroll, was hired in 1989 as a harmony vocalist and guitarist. After Jones's joining, the band was discovered by radio host Lon Helton at a concert in Hot Springs, Arkansas, and he recommended them to Tim DuBois, a record producer who had just started the Nashville branch of Arista Records. While bassist Sonny LeMaire did not initially think the band should continue to use the Exile name due to the membership changes, DuBois thought the name recognition would be beneficial to the new label. LeMaire and Martin alternate as lead vocalists on the album.

"Keep It in the Middle of the Road" was the first single. The song was co-written by Pennington prior to his departure, and featured Martin on lead vocals. In 1990, it peaked at number 17 on the Billboard Hot Country Songs charts. This was followed by "Nobody's Talking" and "Yet", which respectively peaked at numbers two and seven on the same chart. Both tracks featured LeMaire on lead vocals.

== Track listing ==
No.	Title	Writer(s)	Length
1.	"Keep It in the Middle of the Road"	J. P. Pennington, Sonny LeMaire	3:17
2.	"Bad Blood"	LeMaire, Randy Sharp	3:48
3.	"Nobody's Talking"	LeMaire, Sharp	3:34
4.	"I'm Still Standing"	LeMaire, Sharp	3:29
5.	"There You Go"	Sharp, Donny Lowery	3:24
6.	"Don't Hang Up (Girl)"	Kix Brooks, Sharp	3:18
7.	"Show Me"	LeMaire, Sharp	3:34
8.	"Yet"	LeMaire, Sharp	4:21
9.	"For You"	LeMaire, Sharp	3:28
10.	"Only a Woman"	LeMaire, Max D. Barnes	3:29

== Personnel ==
Exile

- Lee Carroll - keyboards, piano
- Mark Jones - acoustic guitar, backing vocals
- Sonny LeMaire - lead vocals ("Nobody's Talking", "There You Go", "Yet", "For You", "Only a Woman"), backing vocals, bass guitar
- Paul Martin - lead vocals ("Keep It in the Middle of the Road", "Bad Blood", "I'm Still Standing", "Don't Hang Up (Girl)", and "Show Me"), backing vocals, electric guitar, acoustic guitar, mandolin, steel guitar, Dobro
- Steve Goetzman - drums, percussion

Additional musicians

- Russ Pahl - steel guitar ("Nobody's Talking")
- Randy Sharp - acoustic guitar ("Yet")

Technical

- Mike Clute - engineering
- Bill Deaton - mixing
- Barry Dixon - mixing
- Tim DuBois - producer
- Denny Purcell - mastering
- Randy Sharp - producer

== Chart performance ==
Chart (1990)	Peak position
US Top Country Albums (Billboard)	42
