= I Watched It All (On My Radio) =

Single by Lionel Cartwright

from the album I Watched It on the Radio
- B-side: "Hard Act to Follow"
- Released: February 12, 1990
- Genre: Country
- Length: 3:21
- Label: MCA
- Songwriters: Lionel Cartwright; Don Schlitz
- Producers: Tony Brown; Steuart Smith

Lionel Cartwright singles chronology
"In My Eyes" (1989)	"I Watched It All (On My Radio)" (1990)	"My Heart Is Set on You" (1990)

"I Watched It All (On My Radio)" is a song co-written and recorded by American country music artist Lionel Cartwright. It was released in February 1990 as the first single from the album I Watched It on the Radio. The song reached number eight on the Billboard Hot Country Singles & Tracks chart. The song was written by Cartwright and Don Schlitz.

== Content ==
"I Watched It All (On My Radio)" is a young man's reminiscence of owning a transistor radio when he was a young boy. He recalls that, at bedtime, he would take the small radio that he had hidden beneath his pillow and began listening.

The lyrics contain references to the peak of AM broadcasting, when most top 40 and country music stations were on the AM band. Along with recollections of listening to music from such acts as The Rolling Stones, The Beatles, Creedence Clearwater Revival and The Byrds, he also remembers listening to baseball games and Saturday night broadcasts of the Grand Ole Opry. Other references mentioned included tests of the Emergency Broadcast System, and the sign-off process, a sermonette by a local preacher ("to tell me what's right, to tell me what's wrong"), and the playing of the National Anthem.

== Music video ==
The music video was directed by John Lloyd Miller and premiered in late 1989.

== Chart performance ==
Chart (1990)	Peak position
Canada Country Singles (RPM)	14
US Hot Country Songs (Billboard)	8

=== Year-end charts ===
Chart (1990)	Position
US Country Songs (Billboard)	68
