= I Watched It on the Radio =

Studio album by Lionel Cartwright
- Released: May 15, 1990
- Recorded: 1989
- Studio: Sound Stage Studios (Nashville, Tennessee)
- Genre: Country
- Length: 34:48
- Label: MCA
- Producer: Tony Brown Steuart Smith

Lionel Cartwright chronology
Lionel Cartwright (1989)	I Watched It on the Radio (1990)	Chasin' the Sun (1991)

Singles from I Watched It on the Radio
- 1. "I Watched It All (On My Radio)" Released: February 12, 1990; 2. "My Heart Is Set on You" Released: July 28, 1990; 3. "Say It's Not True" Released: December 1, 1990

I Watched It on the Radio is the second studio album by American country music artist Lionel Cartwright. Singles released from this album and their performance on the Hot Country Songs chart included, "I Watched It All (On My Radio)" (#8), "My Heart Is Set on You" (#7), and "Say It's Not True" (#31). The album itself peaked at number 21 on the charts.

== Track listing ==
- All songs written by Lionel Cartwright; "I Watched It All (On My Radio)" co-written by Don Schlitz and "Hard Act to Follow" co-written by Cindy Cartwright.

No.	Title	Length
1.	"I Watched It All (On My Radio)"	3:21
2.	"Old Coal Town"	2:59
3.	"Playing It Safe"	3:32
4.	"In the Long Run"	3:45
5.	"Say It's Not True"	4:13
6.	"I Refuse to Sing the Blues"	2:55
7.	"My Heart Is Set on You"	3:13
8.	"Let's Try Again"	3:28
9.	"Hard Act to Follow"	3:42
10.	"True Believer"	3:15

== Release history ==
Year	Type	Label	Catalogue
1990	Cassette	MCA	MCAC-42336
1990	CD	MCA	MCAD-42336

== Chart performance ==
Chart (1990)	Peak position
U.S. Billboard Top Country Albums	21

=== Singles ===
Year	Single	Peak positions	
Year	Single	US Country	CAN Country
1990	"I Watched It All (On My Radio)"	8	14
1990	"My Heart Is Set on You"	7	6
1991	"Say It's Not True"	31	29

== Personnel ==
As listed in liner notes.

- Lionel Cartwright – vocals, mandolin (1, 2, 10), acoustic lead guitar (5), acoustic piano (6, 8), acoustic guitar (7), synthesizers (8)
- Doug Klein – synthesizer programming
- Barry Beckett – acoustic piano (1, 2, 4, 7, 9), Fender Rhodes (3, 9), Hammond B3 organ (5, 6, 8, 10)
- Steuart Smith – synthesizers (1), electric guitar, slide guitar (2), acoustic guitar (9)
- Mac McAnally – acoustic guitar, harmony vocals (2–5, 8)
- Paul Franklin – pedal dobro (1, 6), steel guitar (2–5, 7–9)
- Leland Sklar – bass
- Eddie Bayers – drums, percussion (8)
- Harry Stinson – harmony vocals (1–5, 7, 8, 10), percussion (5)
- Dale Jarvis – harmony vocals (7, 9)

=== Production ===
- Tony Brown – producer
- Steuart Smith – producer
- Chuck Ainlay – recording, mixing, overdub recording
- Mark Coddington – overdub recording, second engineer
- Julian King – second engineer
- Tim Kish – second engineer
- Russ Martin – second engineer
- Milan Bogdan – digital editing
- Glenn Meadows – mastering at Masterfonics (Nashville, Tennessee)
- Andy Byrd – pre-production
- Jessie Noble – project coordinator
- Katherine DeVault – art direction, design
- Glenn Hall – photography
- Noel Fox for Raposa Productions – management
