= In My Eyes (Lionel Cartwright song) =

Single by Lionel Cartwright

from the album Lionel Cartwright
- B-side: "That's Why They Call It Falling"
- Released: October 2, 1989
- Genre: Country
- Length: 4:14
- Label: MCA
- Songwriter: Lionel Cartwright
- Producers: Tony Brown; Steuart Smith

Lionel Cartwright singles chronology
| "Give Me His Last Chance" (1989) | "In My Eyes" (1989) | "I Watched It All (On My Radio)" (1990) |

"In My Eyes" is a song written and recorded by American country music artist Lionel Cartwright. It was released in October 1989 as the fourth and final single from his self-titled album. The song reached number twelve on the Billboard Hot Country Singles & Tracks chart. Before its release as a single, it was the B-side to Cartwright's debut single "You're Gonna Make Her Mine".

Zona Jones covered the song on his 2004 album Harleys & Horses.

== Chart performance ==
"In My Eyes" debuted on the U.S. Billboard Hot Country Singles & Tracks for the week of October 14, 1989.

| Chart (1989–1990) | Peak position |
|---|---|
| Canada Country Singles (RPM) | 6 |
| US Hot Country Songs (Billboard) | 12 |

=== Year-end charts ===
| Chart (1990) | Position |
|---|---|
| Canada Country Tracks (RPM) | 66 |
