= You Know Me Better Than That =

Single by George Strait

from the album Chill of an Early Fall
- B-side: "Baby Blue"
- Released: June 11, 1991
- Recorded: September 25, 1990
- Genre: Western swing
- Length: 3:01
- Label: MCA 54127
- Songwriters: Anna Lisa Graham; Tony Haselden
- Producers: Jimmy Bowen; George Strait

George Strait singles chronology
"If I Know Me" (1991)	"You Know Me Better Than That" (1991)	"The Chill of an Early Fall" (1991)

"You Know Me Better Than That" is a song written by Anna Lisa Graham and Tony Haselden, and recorded by American country music artist George Strait. It was released in June 1991 as the second single from his album Chill of an Early Fall. It peaked at number 1 on both the U.S. Billboard Hot Country Singles & Tracks chart and the Canadian RPM Country Tracks chart.

== Content ==
The song is an uptempo, in which the narrator confides in the significant other who dumped him. He informs her of a sophisticated new girlfriend who idolizes him, but this only displeases him. Likewise, he is haunted by his many flaws, which the former girlfriend knows all too well, and he feels certain that the new girlfriend will eventually realize his inadequacies, and is clearly pining for his old life. It is a rare song in that it deals with the "Impostor syndrome," the belief that one's good fortune is undeserved and likely to disappear.

== Chart positions ==
Chart (1991)	Peak position
Canada Country Singles (RPM)	1
US Hot Country Songs (Billboard)	1

=== Year-end charts ===
Chart (1991)	Position
Canada Country Tracks (RPM)	2
US Country Songs (Billboard)	7
