= If I Know Me =

Single by George Strait

from the album Chill of an Early Fall
- B-side: "Home in San Antone"
- Released: March 12, 1991
- Recorded: September 24, 1990
- Genre: Country
- Length: 2:42
- Label: MCA
- Songwriters: Pam Belford; Dean Dillon
- Producers: Jimmy Bowen; George Strait

George Strait singles chronology
"I've Come to Expect It from You" (1990)	"If I Know Me" (1991)	"You Know Me Better Than That" (1991)

"If I Know Me" is a song written by Pam Belford and Dean Dillon, and recorded by American country music artist George Strait. It was released in March 1991 as the first single to his album Chill of an Early Fall. It peaked at number 1 on both the U.S. Billboard Hot Country Singles & Tracks chart and the Canadian RPM Country Tracks chart.

== Content ==
The narrator has just left his lover, but he knows that if he knew himself, then he'd turn his car around, and not get out of town, and come running back to her.

== Music video ==
The music video was directed by Bill Young and filmed at Victoria's Black Swan Inn in San Antonio.

== Chart positions ==
Chart (1991)	Peak position
Canada Country Singles (RPM)	1
US Hot Country Songs (Billboard)	1

=== Year-end charts ===
Chart (1991)	Position
Canada Country Tracks (RPM)	6
US Country Songs (Billboard)	10
