= Yet (song) =

Single by Exile

from the album Still Standing
- B-side: "Show Me"
- Released: August 1990
- Genre: Country
- Length: 4:21
- Label: Arista
- Songwriters: Sonny LeMaire; Randy Sharp
- Producers: Randy Sharp, Tim DuBois

Exile singles chronology
"Nobody's Talking" (1990)	"Yet" (1990)	"There You Go" (1990)

"Yet" is a song written by Sonny LeMaire and Randy Sharp, and recorded by American country music group Exile. It was released in August 1990 as the third single from their album Still Standing. The song reached number 7 on the Billboard Hot Country Singles & Tracks chart in November 1990.

== Critical reception ==
Lisa Smith and Cyndi Hoelzle of Gavin Report described the song favorably, saying that "This slow, desperate song builds 'til you find yourself rooting for the guy, dying to know how it all turns out."

== Chart performance ==
Chart (1990)	Peak position
Canada Country Singles (RPM)	5
US Hot Country Songs (Billboard)	7

=== Year-end charts ===
Chart (1990)	Position
Canada Country Tracks (RPM)	58
