= Lionel Cartwright =

American singer-songwriter

- Born: Lionel Burke Cartwright; February 10, 1960 (age 66); Gallipolis, Ohio, U.S.
- Origin: Glen Dale, West Virginia, U.S.
- Genres: Country
- Occupations: Singer; Songwriter
- Instruments: Vocals; Guitar; Piano; Mandolin; Fiddle
- Years active: 1988–present
- Label: MCA

Lionel Burke Cartwright (born February 10, 1960) is an American country music artist. Between 1988 and 1992, Cartwright charted twelve singles on the Billboard Hot Country Singles & Tracks charts, including a No. 1 single in 1991's "Leap of Faith". He also charted in the Top 10 on the same chart with "Give Me His Last Chance", "I Watched It All (On My Radio)" and "My Heart is Set on You". Cartwright has also released three studio albums, all on MCA Records.

== Biography ==
Cartwright was born in Gallipolis, Ohio, but was raised in Glen Dale, West Virginia. Cartwright was interested in music from an early age. He first took piano lessons as a child, before going on to master guitar and eight other instruments. Lionel first performed publicly at age ten in community gatherings. He also went on to serve as performer, arranger and musical director on The Nashville Network's musical sitcoms I 40 Paradise and Pickin' at the Paradise.

Later on, Cartwright moved to Nashville, Tennessee, and worked as a demo singer. He was eventually spotted by Tony Brown, a producer at MCA Records, while performing in Knoxville, Tennessee. Brown thought that Cartwright needed more experience before being signed to a record deal, and by 1986, Cartwright was signed to MCA.

Cartwright's self-titled debut album was released in 1989 under the production of Tony Brown. Lead-off single "You're Gonna Make Her Mine" charted at No. 45 on the country charts, followed by three straight Top 20 hits: "Like Father, Like Son" at No. 14, "Give Me His Last Chance" at No. 3 and "In My Eyes" at No. 12. Cartwright wrote nine of the album's ten songs, and played guitar, fiddle, piano and mandolin on it.

In 1990, Lionel received a nomination for Top New Male Vocalist of the Year by the Academy of Country Music Awards, alongside Clint Black and Garth Brooks, losing to Black.

His next album, I Watched It on the Radio, followed in 1990. It was led off by the No. 8 "I Watched It All (On My Radio)", which he co-wrote with Don Schlitz. After it came the No. 7 "My Heart Is Set on You" and No. 31 "Say It's Not True". The album was also his highest peak on Top Country Albums, at No. 21. Brown produced this album as well.

Chasin' the Sun was the title of his third and final MCA release, which was issued in 1991. Unlike with his first two albums, Cartwright worked with several producers and studio musicians. Although the album produced his only No. 1 country hit in its lead-off single "Leap of Faith", the other two singles were not as successful: "What Kind of Fool" reached No. 24 and "Family Tree" missed the Top 40, with a No. 62 peak. After the latter, he charted two more singles ("Be My Angel" and "Standing on the Promises") which were never included on an album, and left MCA in 1992. He wrote "If That's What You Call Love" on Kathy Mattea's 1997 album Love Travels, a song which also featured him on piano and background vocals.

Since exiting MCA, Cartwright has composed themes for many television series, and continues to compose cues and underscores for various shows.

== Discography ==
=== Albums ===
Title	Album details	Peak chart positions	
Title	Album details	US Country	US
Lionel Cartwright	Release date: March 6, 1989; Label: MCA Records; Format: LP, CD, cassette	44	—
I Watched It on the Radio	Release date: May 15, 1990; Label: MCA Records; Format: CD, cassette	21	—
Chasin' the Sun	Release date: August 31, 1991; Label: MCA Records; Format: CD, cassette	27	170
"—" denotes releases that did not chart

=== Singles ===
Year	Single	Peak chart positions		Album
Year	Single	US Country	CAN Country	Album
1988	"You're Gonna Make Her Mine"	45	—	Lionel Cartwright
1989	"Like Father Like Son"	14	21	Lionel Cartwright
1989	"Give Me His Last Chance"	3	7	Lionel Cartwright
1989	"In My Eyes"	12	6	Lionel Cartwright
1990	"I Watched It All (On My Radio)"	8	14	I Watched It on the Radio
1990	"My Heart Is Set on You"	7	6	I Watched It on the Radio
1991	"Say It's Not True"	31	29	I Watched It on the Radio
1991	"Leap of Faith"	1	3	Chasin' the Sun
1991	"What Kind of Fool"	24	19	Chasin' the Sun
1992	"Family Tree"	62	90	Chasin' the Sun
1992	"Be My Angel"	63	56	The Real Story (unreleased)
1992	"Standing on the Promises"	50	89	The Real Story (unreleased)
2013	"Free Me from Myself"	—	—	—N/a
"—" denotes releases that did not chart

=== Music videos ===
Year	Video	Director
1989	"Give Me His Last Chance"	Stephen Buck
1990	"I Watched It All (On My Radio)"	John Lloyd Miller
1990	"Say It's Not True"	John Lloyd Miller
1991	"Leap of Faith"	John Lloyd Miller
1992	"Family Tree"	—N/a
1992	"Be My Angel"	John Lloyd Miller
2013	"Free Me from Myself"	David Moses Perez

== Awards and nominations ==
Year	Organization	Award	Nominee/Work	Result
1990	Academy of Country Music Awards	Top New Male Vocalist	Lionel Cartwright	Nominated
