= The Border (album) =

Studio album by Willie Nelson
- Released: May 31, 2024
- Studio: East Iris (Nashville); Blackbird (Nashville)
- Genre: Country
- Length: 35:13
- Label: Legacy
- Producer: Buddy Cannon

Willie Nelson chronology
Bluegrass (2023)	The Border (2024)	Last Leaf on the Tree (2024)

Singles from The Border
- 1. "The Border" Released: March 14, 2024

The Border is the 75th solo studio album by American singer-songwriter Willie Nelson. It was released on May 31, 2024, through Legacy Recordings. Produced by Buddy Cannon, the album contains four original songs by Nelson and Cannon along with six songs from songwriters such as Rodney Crowell, Shawn Camp and Mike Reid.

The album's lead single and title track, a cover of Crowell and Allen Shamblin's song "The Border" from Crowell's 2019 album Texas, was released on March 14, 2024.

== Background ==
Nelson and Cannon's four songs, like most of their compositions, were written over text threads. Cannon found more material for the album at a Nashville Songwriters Hall of Fame lunch with Mike Reid and Allen Shamblin, which led Reid to send in "Nobody Knows Me Like You" and Shamblin to submit "The Border", which in turn inspired Nelson's manager Mark Rothbaum to suggest another Crowell song, "Many a Long and Lonesome Highway".

== Critical reception ==
Professional ratings
Aggregate scores
Source	Rating
Metacritic	79/100
Review scores
Source	Rating
AllMusic	3.5/5 stars
The Arts Desk	4/5 stars

The Border received positive reviews from music critics. At Metacritic, which assigns a normalized rating out of 100 to reviews from mainstream critics, the album received a score of 79 out of 100 based on six reviews, indicating "generally favorable reviews".

Graeme Thomson at The Spectator found that "the material on The Border smartly plugs into Nelson's mythos", praising Nelson's guitar playing and his ability to communicate while comparing the record's "sombre, stately mood" to the 1996 album Spirit. Texas Monthly, a magazine which has reviewed all of Nelson's albums, found "Willie in better voice and more active on Trigger than he's been since 2018's Last Man Standing" and singled out "Nobody Knows Me Like You" as a highlight. Stephen Thomas Erlewine at AllMusic considered The Border as a sequel to Nelson's 2022 record A Beautiful Time, finding the "levity" in an album where Rodney Crowell contributes the "weightier material", concluding that The Border "doesn't quite feel like a final chapter but rather a welcome coda restating Nelson's strengths with casual ease."

== Track listing ==
The Border track listing
No.	Title	Writer(s)	Length
1.	"The Border"	Rodney Crowell; Allen Shamblin	5:10
2.	"Once Upon a Yesterday"	Willie Nelson; Buddy Cannon	3:41
3.	"What If I'm Out of My Mind"	Nelson; Cannon	2:58
4.	"I Wrote This Song for You"	Larry Cordle; Erin Enderlin	3:49
5.	"Kiss Me When You're Through"	Nelson; Cannon	2:45
6.	"Many a Long and Lonesome Highway"	Crowell; Will Jennings	4:05
7.	"Hank's Guitar"	Cannon; Bobby Tomberlin	3:06
8.	"Made in Texas"	Shawn Camp; Monty Holmes	2:25
9.	"Nobody Knows Me Like You"	Mike Reid	3:56
10.	"How Much Does It Cost"	Nelson; Cannon	3:21
Total length:			35:13

== Personnel ==
Musicians

- Barry Bales – acoustic bass
- Jim "Moose" Brown – organ, piano, synthesizer
- Buddy Cannon – background vocals
- Melonie Cannon – background vocals
- Fred Eltringham – drums, percussion
- James Mitchell – electric guitar
- Willie Nelson – lead vocals, Trigger
- Mickey Raphael – harmonica
- Bobby Terry – acoustic guitar, electric guitar, steel guitar

Technical

- Buddy Cannon – production
- Andrew Mendelson – mastering
- Tony Castle – mixing, engineering
- Adam Battershell – engineering assistance
- Joey Salit – engineering assistance
- Luke Armentrout – engineering assistance
- Michelle Freetly – engineering assistance
- Sean Badum – engineering assistance
- Taylor Chadwick – engineering assistance
- Shannon Finnegan – production coordinator
- Mark Rothbaum – executive producer

Other personnel

- Frank Harkins – art direction and design
- Pamela Springsteen – photography (Trigger)
- Kelly VanDellan and William Silver – photography (Big Bend)

== Charts ==
Chart performance for The Border
Chart (2024)	Peak position
Australian Country Albums (ARIA)	39
Austrian Albums (Ö3 Austria)	58
Croatian International Albums (HDU)	6
Scottish Albums (OCC)	22
Swedish Physical Albums (Sverigetopplistan)	16
UK Album Downloads (OCC)	63
UK Country Albums (OCC)	3
US Top Album Sales (Billboard)	14
US Top Country Albums (Billboard)	50
