= I've Come to Expect It from You =

Single by George Strait

from the album Livin' It Up
- B-side: "Stranger in My Arms"
- Released: October 22, 1990
- Recorded: February 13, 1990
- Genre: Country
- Length: 3:45
- Label: MCA 53969
- Songwriters: Buddy Cannon; Dean Dillon
- Producers: Jimmy Bowen; George Strait

George Strait singles chronology
"Drinking Champagne" (1990)	"I've Come to Expect It from You" (1990)	"If I Know Me" (1991)

"I've Come to Expect It from You" is a song written by Buddy Cannon and Dean Dillon, and recorded by American country music artist George Strait. It was released in October 1990 as the third and final single from his album Livin' It Up. It peaked at number 1 on both the U.S. Billboard Hot Country Singles & Tracks chart and the Canadian RPM Country Tracks chart. In the United States it stayed at number 1 for five weeks. In Canada, it reached number 1 in January 1991 and stayed there for one week.

== Content ==
The song is about the male narrator describing his ex-lover's apathetic attitude. It is composed in the key of B-flat major with a main chord pattern of F7-B♭.

== Critical reception ==
Rating it "A", Kevin John Coyne of Country Universe wrote that "It’s nervy and angry, with a thread of bitterness that Strait has rarely explored in his work."

== Chart performance ==
Chart (1990–1991)	Peak position
Canada Country Singles (RPM)	1
US Hot Country Songs (Billboard)	1

=== Year-end charts ===
Chart (1991)	Position
Canada Country Tracks (RPM)	53
US Country Songs (Billboard)	2
