= Exile (American band) discography =

Exile discography
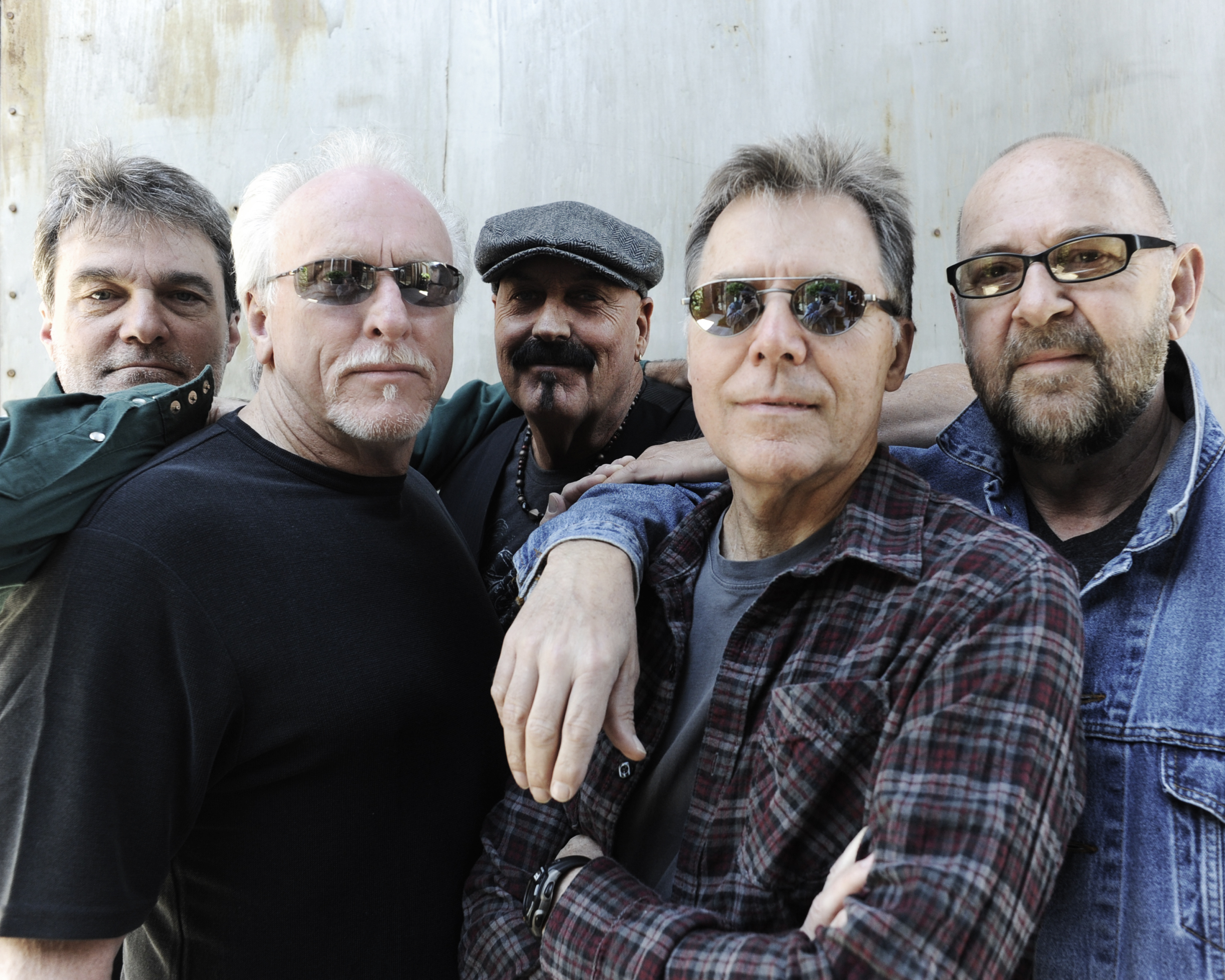
- Exile in 2013.
- Studio albums: 13
- Live albums: 2
- Compilation albums: 5
- Singles: 40
- Music videos: 8

American band Exile has released 15 studio albums, five compilation albums, two live albums, 40 singles, and eight music videos.

Initially, Exile was a rock and roll and rhythm and blues band, releasing several unsuccessful singles on a number of labels including Date and Wooden Nickel. The band broke through in 1978 with the soft rock hit "Kiss You All Over", a number-one single on the Billboard Hot 100. After a number of unsuccessful followups, Exile shifted to country music in 1983 with their first country music release "High Cost of Leaving". Between late 1983 and early 1988, Exile charted ten number-one singles on the Billboard Hot Country Songs charts. While the band has not charted anywhere since 1991, Exile has continued to issue albums into the 21st century.

== Albums ==
=== Studio albums ===
Title	Album details	Peak chart positions					Certifications
Title	Album details	US	US Country	AUS	CAN	CAN Country	Certifications
Exile	Release date: 1973; Label: Wooden Nickel	—	—	—	—	—	
Stage Pass	Release date: 1973; Label: Wooden Nickel	—	—	—	—	—	
Mixed Emotions	Release date: 1978; Label: Warner Bros. / Curb	14	—	52	12	—	US: Gold
All There Is	Release date: 1979; Label: Warner Bros. / Curb	—	—	96	—	—	
Don't Leave Me This Way (re-named Keeping It Country)	Release date: 1980; Label: Warner Bros. / Curb	—	—	—	—	—	
Heart & Soul	Release date: 1981; Label: Warner Bros. / Curb	—	—	—	—	—	
Exile	Release date: 1983; Label: Epic	—	10	—	—	4	
Kentucky Hearts	Release date: 1984; Label: Epic	—	1	—	—	—	
Hang On to Your Heart	Release date: 1985; Label: Epic	—	2	—	—	—	
Shelter from the Night	Release date: 1987; Label: Epic	—	13	—	—	—	
Still Standing	Release date: February 14. 1990; Label: Arista Nashville	—	42	—	—	—	
Justice	Release date: June 25, 1991; Label: Arista Nashville	—	66	—	—	—	
Wrapped Up in Your Arms for Christmas	Release date: October 21, 2015; Label: BFD	—	—	—	—	—	
A Joyful Noise	Release date: July 12, 2023; Label: Clearwater Records	—	—	—	—	—	
A Million Miles Later	Release date: August 25, 2023; Label: Clearwater Records	—	—	—	—	—	
Look Out, Heart	Release date: October 23, 2026; Label: Clearwater Records	—	—	—	—	—	
"—" denotes releases that did not chart

=== Compilation albums ===
Title	Album details	Peak positions	Certifications
Title	Album details	US Country	Certifications
The Best of Exile	Release date: 1985; Label: Curb / MCA	—	
Greatest Hits	Release date: 1986; Label: Epic	2	US: Gold
The Complete Collection	Release date: 1991; Label: Curb	—	
Latest & Greatest	Release date: May 30, 1995; Label: Intersound	—	
The Garage Tapes	Release date: July 13, 2019; Label: Big Horse	—	
"—" denotes releases that did not chart

=== Live albums ===
Title	Album details
Live at Billy Bob's Texas	Release date: May 4, 2004; Label: Image Entertainment
Live at the Franklin Theater	Release date: September 9, 2014; Label: Fuel

== Singles ==
=== 1960s and 1970s ===
Year	Single	Peak chart positions							Certifications	Album
Year	Single	US	US AC	AUS	CAN	CAN AC	NL	UK	Certifications	Album
1965	"Stay With Me"/"My Three Loves" (as the Exiles) (unreleased)	—	—	—	—	—	—	—		
1965	"The Answer to Her Prayers" (as the Exiles)	—	—	—	—	—	—	—		
1965	"Alligator Time" (as Jimmy Stokley and the Exiles)	—	—	—	—	—	—	—		
1968	"Come Out, Come Out Whoever You Are" (as the Exiles)	—	—	—	—	—	—	—		
1968	"Mary on the Beach" (as the Exiles)	—	—	—	—	—	—	—		
1969	"Church St. Soul Revival" (as the Exiles)	— (Note: "Church St. Soul Revival" did not enter the Billboard Hot 100, but peaked at number four on Bubbling Under Hot 100 Singles.)	—	—	—	—	—	—		
1970	"Put Your Hands Together" (as the Exiles)	—	—	—	—	—	—	—		
1973	"Devil's Bite / Mabel"	—	—	—	—	—	—	—		Exile (1973)
1976	"Try It On"	97	—	—	—	—	—	—		Non-album single
1978	"Kiss You All Over"	1	19	1	2	2	7	6	US: Platinum; BPI: Silver	Mixed Emotions
1978	"Never Gonna Stop"	—	—	—	—	—	—	—		Mixed Emotions
1978	"You Thrill Me"	40	—	31	39	—	—	—		Mixed Emotions
1979	"How Could This Go Wrong"	88	—	68	—	—	46	67		All There Is
1979	"The Part of Me That Needs You Most"	—	—	81	—	—	—	—		All There Is
1979	"Too Proud to Cry"	—	—	—	—	—	—	—		All There Is
"—" denotes releases that did not chart

=== 1980s–2020s ===
Year	Single	Peak chart positions						Album
Year	Single	US Bubbling	US AC	US Country	CAN Country	NL	UK	Album
1980	"You're Good for Me"	5	44	—	—	—	—	Don't Leave Me This Way (re-named Keeping It Country)
1980	"Take Me Down"	2	—	—	—	—	—	Don't Leave Me This Way (re-named Keeping It Country)
1981	"Heart and Soul"	2	—	—	—	36	54	Heart & Soul
1981	"What Kind of Love Is This"	—	—	—	—	—	—	Heart & Soul
1983	"High Cost of Leaving"	—	—	27	—	—	—	Exile (1983)
1983	"Woke Up in Love"	—	—	1	1	—	—	Exile (1983)
1984	"I Don't Want to Be a Memory"	—	—	1	1	—	—	Exile (1983)
1984	"Give Me One More Chance"	—	—	1	1	—	—	Kentucky Hearts
1984	"Crazy for Your Love"	—	—	1	1	—	—	Kentucky Hearts
1985	"She's a Miracle"	—	—	1	1	—	—	Kentucky Hearts
1985	"Hang On to Your Heart"	—	—	1	1	—	—	Hang On to Your Heart
1985	"I Could Get Used to You"	—	—	1	1	—	—	Hang On to Your Heart
1986	"Super Love"	—	—	14	21	—	—	Hang On to Your Heart
1986	"It'll Be Me"	—	—	1	1	—	—	Hang On to Your Heart
1987	"She's Too Good to Be True"	—	—	1	1	—	—	Hang On to Your Heart
1987	"I Can't Get Close Enough"	—	—	1	1	—	—	Shelter from the Night
1988	"Feel Like Foolin' Around"	—	—	60	—	—	—	Shelter from the Night
1988	"Just One Kiss"	—	—	9	3	—	—	Shelter from the Night
1988	"It's You Again"	—	—	21	21	—	—	Shelter from the Night
1989	"Keep It in the Middle of the Road"	—	—	17	19	—	—	Still Standing
1990	"Nobody's Talking"	—	—	2	3	—	—	Still Standing
1990	"Yet"	—	—	7	5	—	—	Still Standing
1990	"There You Go"	—	—	32	51	—	—	Still Standing
1991	"Even Now"	—	—	16	10	—	—	Justice
1991	"Nothing at All"	—	—	—	—	—	—	Justice
1991	"Somebody's Telling Her Lies"	—	—	—	—	—	—	Justice
1995	"How Bad Can It Be"	—	—	—	86	—	—	Latest & Greatest
2023	"Rough Around the Edges"	—	—	—	—	—	—	A Million Miles Later
2026	"Look Out, Heart"	—	—	—	—	—	—	Look Out, Heart
2026	"Rain Keeps Falling"	—	—	—	—	—	—	Look Out, Heart
2026	"Blood Red Moon"	—	—	—	—	—	—	Look Out, Heart
2026	"Habanero"	—	—	—	—	—	—	Look Out, Heart
"—" denotes releases that did not chart

=== Promotional singles ===
Year	Single	Peak positions	Album
Year	Single	US Country	Album
1985	"Stay with Me"	86	Mixed Emotions
1985	"Dixie Girl"	—	Heart & Soul
"—" denotes releases that did not chart

== Music videos ==
Year	Video	Director
1978	"Kiss You All Over"	
1984	"Give Me One More Chance"	
1985	"She's a Miracle"	Doug Dowdle
1985	"If I Didn't Love You"	
1987	"I Can't Get Close Enough"	Bob Small
1989	"Keep It in the Middle of the Road"	Dean Lent
1990	"Nobody's Talking"	Jim May
1991	"Even Now"	
