= Greatest Hits (Exile album) =

Greatest hits album by Exile
- Released: 1986
- Genre: Country
- Length: 32:41
- Label: Epic
- Producer: Buddy Killen

Exile chronology
Hang On to Your Heart (1985)	Greatest Hits (1986)	Shelter from the Night (1987)

Greatest Hits is the first compilation album by American country pop group Exile. It was released in 1986 via Epic Records.

== Track listing ==
No.	Title	Writer(s)	Length
1.	"Woke Up in Love"	J. P. Pennington	3:09
2.	"I Don't Want to Be a Memory"	Pennington, Sonny LeMaire	3:41
3.	"Give Me One More Chance"	Pennington, LeMaire	2:49
4.	"She's a Miracle"	Pennington, LeMaire	3:38
5.	"Hang On to Your Heart"	Pennington, LeMaire	3:42
6.	"The Girl Can't Help It"	Pennington, LeMaire	3:29
7.	"I Could Get Used to You"	Pennington, LeMaire	2:42
8.	"Crazy for Your Love"	Pennington, LeMaire	3:28
9.	"Super Love"	Pennington, LeMaire	2:46
10.	"Kiss You All Over"	Mike Chapman, Nicky Chinn	3:34

== Chart performance ==
Chart (1986)	Peak position
US Top Country Albums (Billboard)	2

== Certifications ==
Region	Certification	Certified units/sales
United States (RIAA)	Gold	500,000^{^}
^{^} Shipments figures based on certification alone.
