= List of Top Country Albums number ones of 1984 =

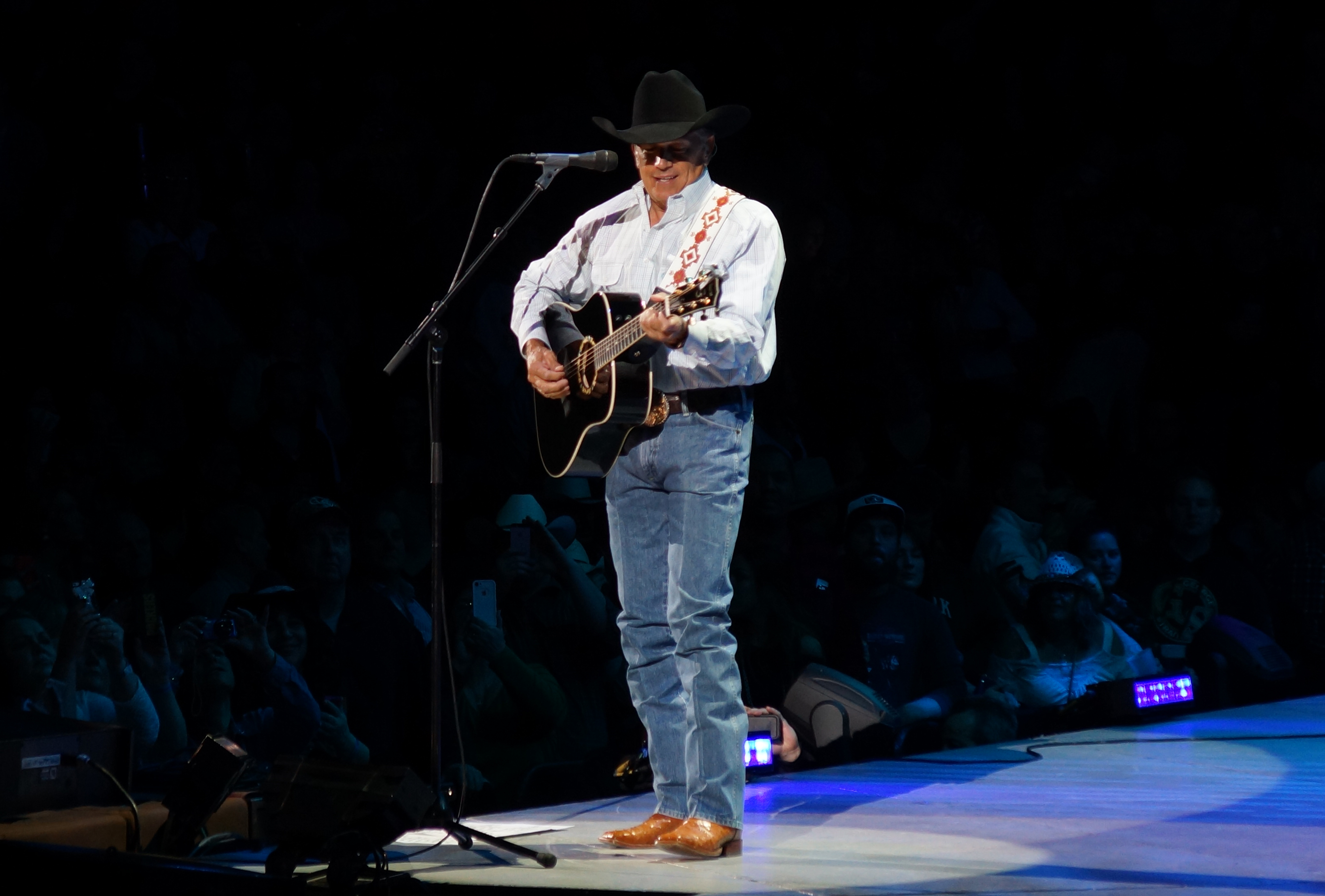
George Strait achieved his first chart-topper in 1984.

Top Country Albums is a chart that ranks the top-performing country music albums in the United States, published by Billboard. In 1984, nine different albums topped the chart, based on sales reports submitted by a representative sample of stores nationwide. The chart was published under the title Top Country LPs through the issue of Billboard dated October 13, and Top Country Albums thereafter.

In the issue of Billboard dated January 7, Kenny Rogers was at number one with his album Eyes That See in the Dark, its eleventh week in the top spot. The album remained at number one through the issue dated February 11, after which it was displaced by Right or Wrong by George Strait, which spent five non-consecutive weeks atop the chart over a seven-month period. It was the first number one for Strait, who would go on to set a record for the highest number of chart-toppers by an artist, reaching the peak position with 27 albums over the subsequent 35 years. Having sold more than 100 million albums in his career, Strait is considered one of the biggest stars in country music.

In July, Hank Williams Jr reached number one for the first time in more than fifteen years with Major Moves; his only previous appearance at the top of the chart had been in 1969 with Songs My Father Left Me. Nine of his ten albums which entered the chart between 1979 and 1983 had reached the top ten but fallen short of the peak position; Major Moves, however, would begin a run of eight consecutive chart-toppers for the singer. Alabama's album Roll On spent the highest total number of weeks at number one in 1984, with thirteen weeks in the peak position in two separate spells. It was the fourth consecutive album by the band to top the chart, but had the shortest time in the top spot of their four number ones to date; the previous three had all spent over 20 weeks at number one. The longest unbroken run at number one in 1984 was achieved by Willie Nelson with City of New Orleans, which spent 12 consecutive weeks atop the chart. It was displaced in the issue of Billboard dated December 22 by the year's final chart-topper, Kentucky Hearts, the first number-one country album for the band Exile. The band had originally performed primarily pop music and had topped the Hot 100 in 1978 with the disco-influenced track "Kiss You All Over", but went on to achieve much greater success after a shift to the country genre in the early 1980s.

== Chart history ==
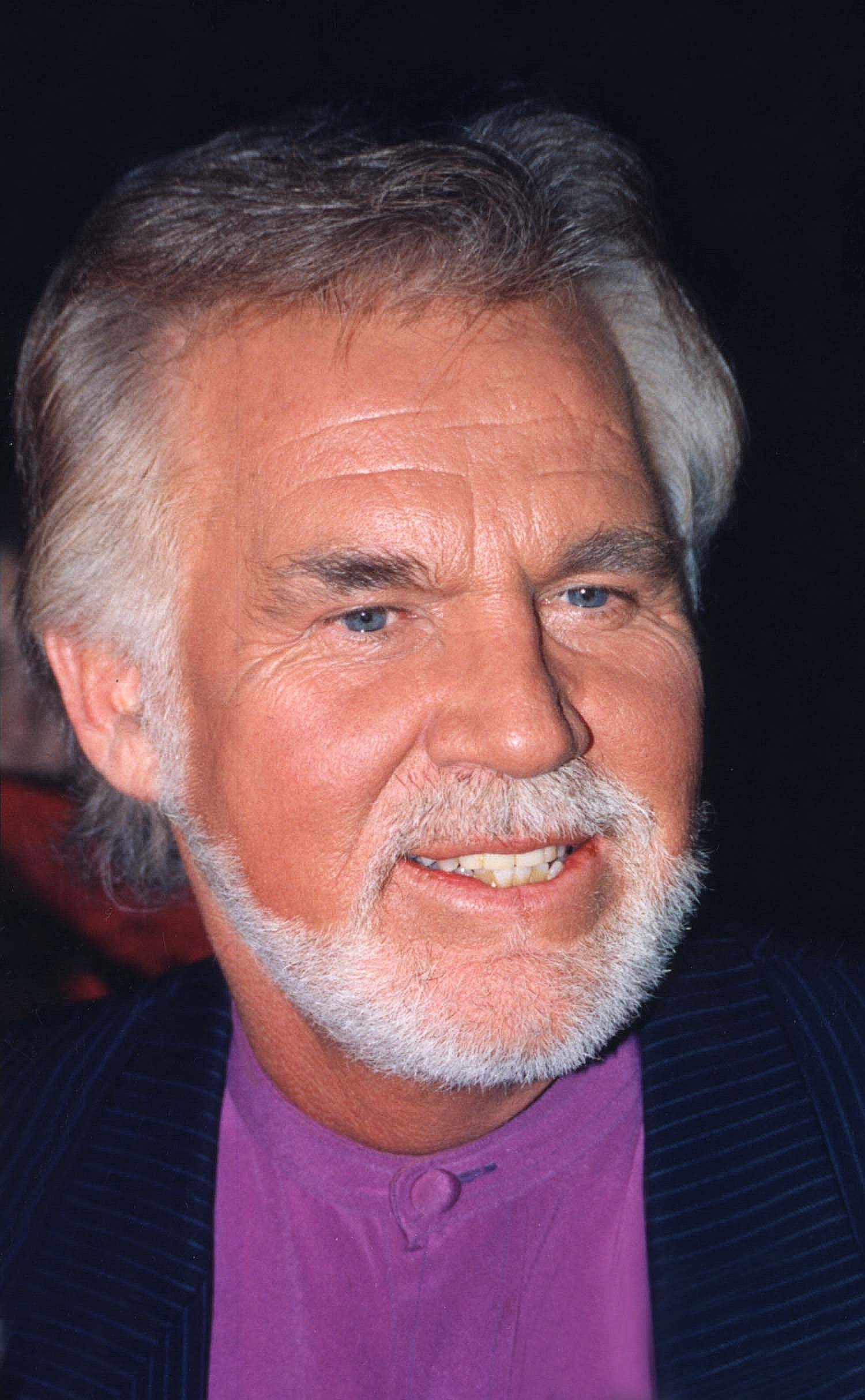
At the start of the year Kenny Rogers was in the midst of a long run at number one with Eyes That See in the Dark.

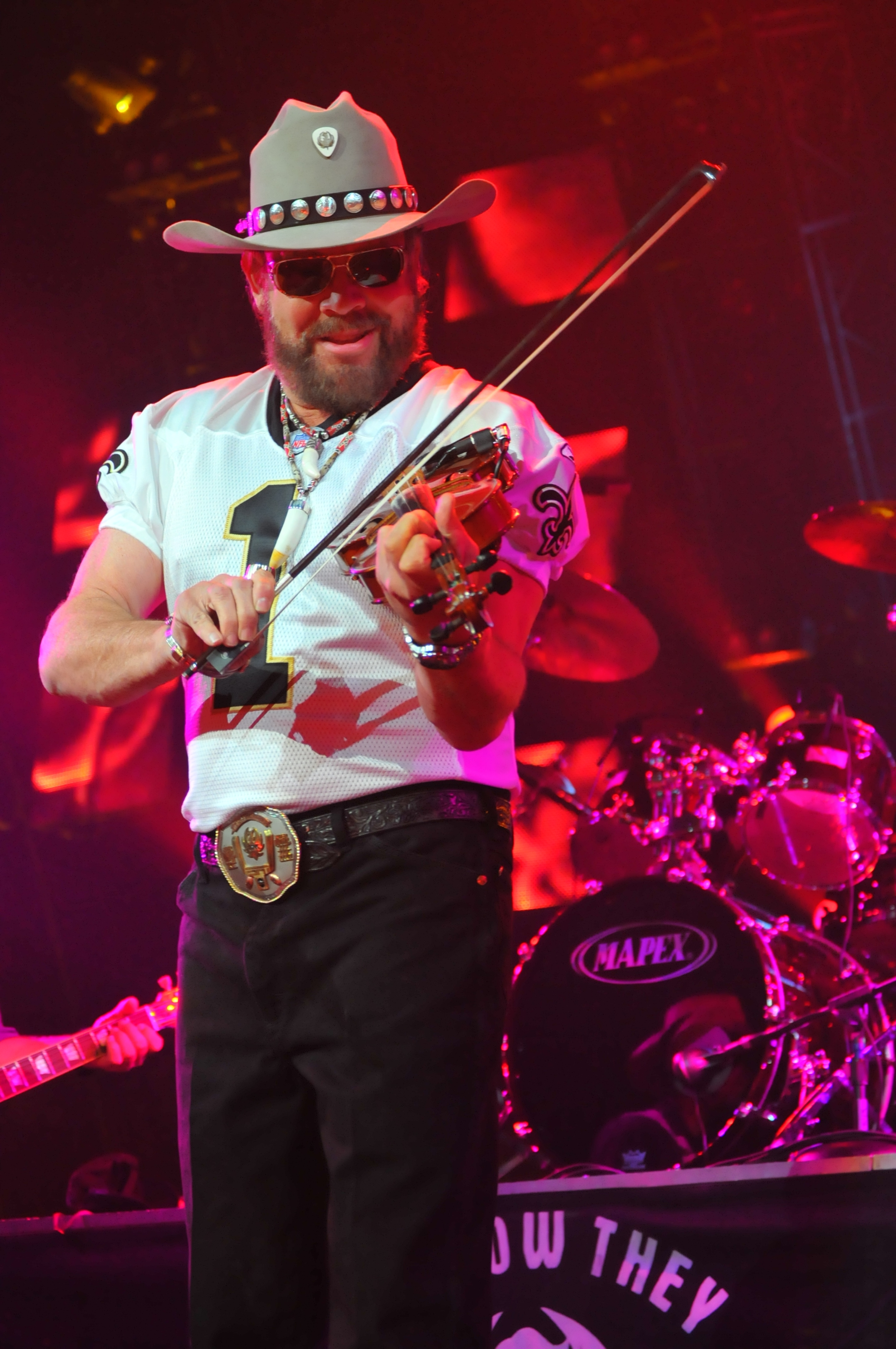
Hank Williams Jr spent seven weeks at number one with Major Moves.

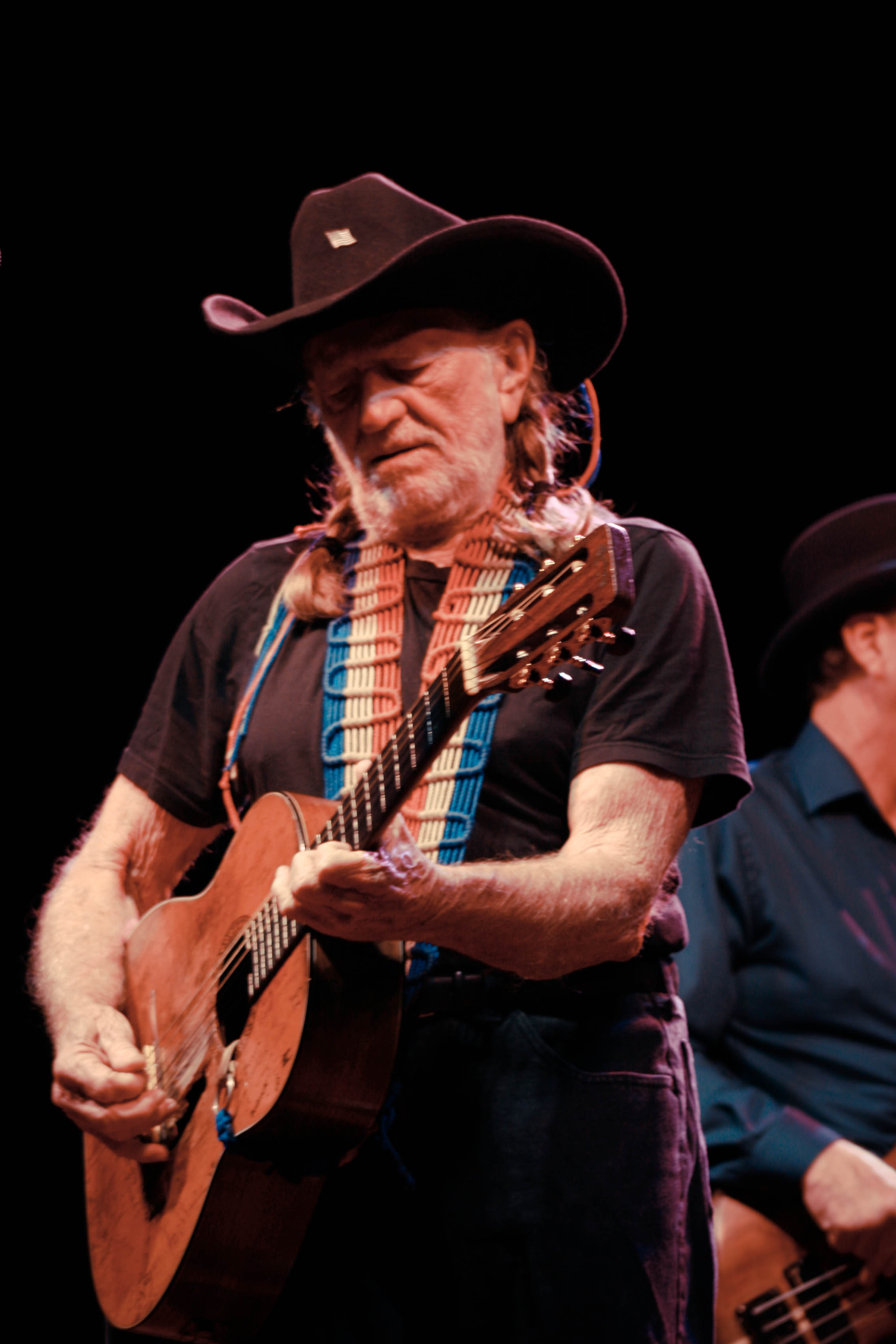
Willie Nelson's City of New Orleans had the year's longest unbroken run at number one.

Issue date	Title	Artist(s)	Ref.
January 7	Eyes That See in the Dark	Kenny Rogers	
January 14	Eyes That See in the Dark	Kenny Rogers	
January 21	Eyes That See in the Dark	Kenny Rogers	
January 28	Eyes That See in the Dark	Kenny Rogers	
February 4	Eyes That See in the Dark	Kenny Rogers	
February 11	Eyes That See in the Dark	Kenny Rogers	
February 18	Right or Wrong	George Strait	
February 25	Don't Cheat in Our Hometown	Ricky Skaggs	
March 3	Right or Wrong	George Strait	
March 10	Right or Wrong	George Strait	
March 17	Roll On	Alabama	
March 24	Roll On	Alabama	
March 31	Roll On	Alabama	
April 7	Roll On	Alabama	
April 14	Roll On	Alabama	
April 21	Roll On	Alabama	
April 28	Deliver	The Oak Ridge Boys	
May 4	Deliver	The Oak Ridge Boys	
May 11	Deliver	The Oak Ridge Boys	
May 18	Deliver	The Oak Ridge Boys	
May 25	Deliver	The Oak Ridge Boys	
June 2	Roll On	Alabama	
June 9	Roll On	Alabama	
June 16	Roll On	Alabama	
June 23	Roll On	Alabama	
June 30	Roll On	Alabama	
July 7	Roll On	Alabama	
July 14	Roll On	Alabama	
July 21	Major Moves	Hank Williams Jr.	
July 28	Major Moves	Hank Williams Jr.	
August 4	Major Moves	Hank Williams Jr.	
August 11	Major Moves	Hank Williams Jr.	
August 18	Major Moves	Hank Williams Jr.	
August 25	Major Moves	Hank Williams Jr.	
September 1	Right or Wrong	George Strait	
September 8	Right or Wrong	George Strait	
September 15	Major Moves	Hank Williams Jr.	
September 22	It's All in the Game	Merle Haggard	
September 29	City of New Orleans	Willie Nelson	
October 6	City of New Orleans	Willie Nelson	
October 13	City of New Orleans	Willie Nelson	
October 20	City of New Orleans	Willie Nelson	
October 27	City of New Orleans	Willie Nelson	
November 3	City of New Orleans	Willie Nelson	
November 10	City of New Orleans	Willie Nelson	
November 17	City of New Orleans	Willie Nelson	
November 24	City of New Orleans	Willie Nelson	
December 1	City of New Orleans	Willie Nelson	
December 8	City of New Orleans	Willie Nelson	
December 15	City of New Orleans	Willie Nelson	
December 22	Kentucky Hearts	Exile	
December 29	Kentucky Hearts	Exile	
