= Hang On to Your Heart (album) =

Studio album by Exile
- Released: 1985
- Genre: Country
- Length: 31:48
- Label: Epic
- Producer: Buddy Killen

Exile chronology
Kentucky Hearts (1984)	Hang On to Your Heart (1985)	Greatest Hits (1986)

Hang On Your Heart is the ninth studio album by American country pop group Exile. It was released in 1985 via Epic Records. The album includes the singles "Hang On to Your Heart", "I Could Get Used to You" "Super Love", "It'll Be Me" and "She's Too Good to Be True".

== Track listing ==
All tracks are written by J.P. Pennington and Sonny LeMaire.

No.	Title	Length
1.	"Promises, Promises"	2:31
2.	"I Could Get Used to You"	2:41
3.	"Hang On to Your Heart"	3:34
4.	"She Likes Her Lovin'"	3:06
5.	"Music"	3:32
6.	"Super Love"	3:53
7.	"It'll Be Me"	2:54
8.	"Practice Makes Perfect"	3:21
9.	"She's Too Good to Be True"	3:36
10.	"Proud to Be Her Man"	2:38

== Chart performance ==
Chart (1985)	Peak position
US Top Country Albums (Billboard)	2
