= Kentucky Hearts =

Studio album by Exile
- Released: 1984
- Studio: SoundShop Recording Studios, Nashville, TN
- Genre: Country
- Label: Epic
- Producer: Buddy Killen

Exile chronology
Exile (1983)	Kentucky Hearts (1984)	Hang On to Your Heart (1985)

Singles from Kentucky Hearts
- 1. "Give Me One More Chance" Released: July 1984; 2. "Crazy for Your Love" Released: November 1984; 3. "She's a Miracle" Released: March 1985

Kentucky Hearts is the eighth studio album by American country pop band Exile. It was released in 1984 via Epic Records. The album peaked at number 1 on the Billboard Top Country Albums chart. "Just in Case" was later a number 1 hit for The Forester Sisters, whose version appears on their 1985 self-titled debut album.

== Track listing ==
All songs written by J.P. Pennington and Sonny LeMaire except "Comin' Apart at the Seams", written by Jerry Marcum and Les Taylor.

No.	Title	Length
1.	"She's a Miracle"	3:47
2.	"I've Never Seen Anything"	2:30
3.	"You Make It Easy"	3:40
4.	"Comin' Apart at the Seams"	3:04
5.	"Just in Case"	2:35
6.	"Give Me One More Chance"	2:46
7.	"Somethin' You Got"	3:40
8.	"If I Didn't Love You"	3:55
9.	"Ain't That a Pity"	2:36
10.	"Crazy for Your Love"	3:25

== Personnel ==
- Steve Goetzman - drums
- Marlon Hargis - keyboards
- Sonny LeMaire - bass guitar, background vocals
- J.P. Pennington - guitar, lead vocals, background vocals
- Les Taylor- guitar, lead vocals, background vocals

Strings arranged by D. Bergen White

== Charts ==
=== Weekly charts ===
Chart (1984)	Peak position
US Top Country Albums (Billboard)	1

=== Year-end charts ===
Chart (1985)	Position
US Top Country Albums (Billboard)	6
