= She's Too Good to Be True (Exile song) =

Single by Exile

from the album Hang On to Your Heart
- B-side: "Promises, Promises"
- Released: April 1987
- Genre: Country
- Length: 3:38
- Label: Epic
- Songwriters: J.P. Pennington; Sonny LeMaire
- Producer: Buddy Killen

Exile singles chronology
"It'll Be Me" (1986)	"She's Too Good to Be True" (1987)	"I Can't Get Close Enough" (1987)

Music video
- "She's Too Good to Be True" on YouTube

"She's Too Good to Be True" is a song written by J.P. Pennington and Sonny LeMaire, and recorded by American country music group Exile. It was released in April 1987 as the fifth single from the album Hang On to Your Heart. The song was Exile's ninth number one country song. The single went to number one for one week and spent a total of fourteen weeks on the country chart.

== Charts ==
=== Weekly charts ===
Chart (1987)	Peak position
US Hot Country Songs (Billboard)	1
Canada Country Singles (RPM)	1

=== Year-end charts ===
Chart (1987)	Position
US Hot Country Songs (Billboard)	25
