= Shelter from the Night =

Studio album by Exile
- Released: 1987
- Genre: Country, country pop
- Length: 35:45
- Label: Epic
- Producer: Elliot Scheiner

Exile chronology
Greatest Hits (1986)	Shelter from the Night (1987)	Still Standing (1990)

Shelter from the Night is a studio album by American country pop group Exile. It was released in 1987 via Epic Records. It includes the singles "I Can't Get Close Enough", "Feel Like Foolin' Around", "Just One Kiss" and "It's You Again".

== Critical reception ==
Professional ratings
Review scores
Source	Rating
The Philadelphia Inquirer	1/4 stars

The Philadelphia Inquirer dismissed the album as "empty, cliche-ridden country-pop music from a group whose members apparently think that turning up the volume on their guitars qualifies as a bold new direction." The Richmond Times-Dispatch wrote that the album "finds the five-man country pop band ranging from Southern rock to contemporary country, along with a touch of rhythm and blues."

== Track listing ==
No.	Title	Writer(s)	Length
1.	"Just One Kiss"	J. P. Pennington, Sonny LeMaire	3:52
2.	"Shelter from the Night"	David Thompson, Michael Foster	3:24
3.	"My Heart's in Good Hands"	Pennington, LeMaire	3:11
4.	"Showdown"	Pennington, LeMaire	3:13
5.	"Fly on the Wall"	Bruce Hornsby, Bernie Taupin	3:24
6.	"Feel Like Foolin' Around"	Pennington, LeMaire, Les Taylor	3:52
7.	"I Can't Get Close Enough"	Pennington, LeMaire	4:12
8.	"She's Already Gone"	John Farrar	3:29
9.	"It's You Again"	Pennington, LeMaire	3:40
10.	"As Long as I Have Your Memory"	Pennington, LeMaire	3:28

== Chart performance ==
Chart (1987)	Peak position
US Top Country Albums (Billboard)	13
