= I Can't Get Close Enough =

Single by Exile

from the album Shelter from the Night
- B-side: "As Long as I Have Your Memory"
- Released: August 1987
- Genre: Country
- Length: 4:11
- Label: Epic
- Songwriters: J.P. Pennington; Sonny LeMaire
- Producer: Elliot Scheiner

Exile singles chronology
"She's Too Good to Be True" (1987)	"I Can't Get Close Enough" (1987)	"Feel Like Foolin' Around" (1988)

Music video
- "I Can't Get Close Enough" on YouTube

"I Can't Get Close Enough" is a song written by J.P. Pennington and Sonny LeMaire and recorded by American country music group Exile. It was released in August 1987 as the first single from the album Shelter from the Night. The song was Exile's tenth and final number one country hit. The single went to number for one week and spent a total of fourteen weeks on the country chart.

== Charts ==
Chart (1987–1988)	Peak position
US Hot Country Songs (Billboard)	1
Canada Country Singles (RPM)	1
