= She's a Miracle =

Single by Exile

from the album Kentucky Hearts
- B-side: "I've Never Seen Anything"
- Released: March 1985
- Genre: Country
- Length: 3:36
- Label: Epic
- Songwriters: J.P. Pennington; Sonny LeMaire
- Producer: Buddy Killen

Exile singles chronology
"Crazy for Your Love" (1984)	"She's a Miracle" (1985)	"Hang On to Your Heart" (1985)

Music video
- "She's a Miracle" on YouTube

"She's a Miracle" is a song written by J.P. Pennington and Sonny LeMaire, and recorded by American country music group Exile. It was released in March 1985 as the third single from the album Kentucky Hearts. The song was Exile's sixth number one on the country chart. The single went to number one for one week and spent a total of thirteen weeks on the country chart.

== Charts ==
=== Weekly charts ===
Chart (1985)	Peak position
US Hot Country Songs (Billboard)	1
Canada Country Singles (RPM)	1

=== Year-end charts ===
Chart (1985)	Position
US Hot Country Songs (Billboard)	13
