= It'll Be Me (Exile song) =

Single by Exile

from the album Hang On to Your Heart
- B-side: "Music"
- Released: July 1986
- Genre: Country
- Length: 2:54
- Label: Epic
- Songwriters: J.P. Pennington; Sonny LeMaire
- Producer: Buddy Killen

Exile singles chronology
"Super Love" (1986)	"It'll Be Me" (1986)	"She's Too Good to Be True" (1987)

Music video
- "It'll Be Me" on YouTube

"It'll Be Me" is a song written by J.P. Pennington and Sonny LeMaire, and recorded by American country music group Exile. It was released in July 1986 as the fourth single from the album Hang On to Your Heart. The song was Exile's seventh number one country single in North America. The single went to number one for one week and spent a total of fifteen weeks on the country chart.

== Charts ==
Chart (1986)	Peak position
US Hot Country Songs (Billboard)	1
Canada Country Singles (RPM)	1
