= Mixed Emotions (Exile album) =

Studio album by Exile
- Released: 1978
- Recorded: 1978
- Genres: Pop rock, soft rock
- Length: 37:21
- Label: Warner Bros.
- Producer: Mike Chapman

Exile chronology
Stage Pass (1973)	Mixed Emotions (1978)	All There Is (1979)

Singles from Mixed Emotions
- 1. "Kiss You All Over" Released: June 1978; 2. "You Thrill Me" Released: November 1978

Mixed Emotions is the third studio album by American band Exile. It peaked at number 14 on the Billboard Top LPs & Tape chart in 1978.

== Background ==
After their self-titled debut and Stage Pass albums failed to chart, Exile were dropped from Wooden Nickel Records. Shortly after, longtime members Bernie Faulkner, Kenny Weir and co-founder Billy Luxon would all depart between 1974 and 1975. Faulkner and Weir were replaced with Marlon Hargis and Danny Williams, in place of keyboards and bass respectively.

Between 1975 and 1977, Exile would continue to tour in their local region, when producer Mike Chapman would discover a demo from the band in his office.

Through his sources, Chapman got Exile signed on a single deal with Atco Records, releasing the single "Try It On", composed by Chapman and his co-writing partner, Nicky Chinn. The single's B-side, was "Show Me What You Got", and was composed by Exile.

"Try It On" would peak at no. 97 on the Billboard Top 100, but was not a hit to the record label, and the band were dropped from Atco. Shortly after, Exile drummer Bobby Johns would depart and later join the hard rock band, Roadmaster. He would then be replaced with Steve Goetzman.

Although Chapman had initially chosen not to work with Exile again following the failure of "Try It On", his wife persuaded him to give the band a second chance, as she liked their music.

Chapman then invited the band to the Forum, a recording studio in Covington, Kentucky, where he presented them with a song he had written called "Kiss You All Over". The band agreed to record it, though they were initially reluctant, due to its subject matter.

The band spent nearly an entire day in the studio recording it, owing to Chapman's "demanding" production style. When it came to recording the lead vocals, trouble arose, as Chapman found great difficulty recording Stokley's voice due to his raspy delivery and poor sense of pitch, which was a result of years of screaming during the band's early years.

After some stressful sessions, Chapman brought in lead guitarist and co-founder J.P. Pennington and bassist Danny Williams to perform vocals on lines that Stokley had issues singing. On "Kiss You All Over", Pennington would share the verses, the pre-choruses with Stokley, and the choruses with Williams, who sang in a lower register and would provide the higher vocal notes.

Through connections with journalist Nola Leone, Chapman was able to contact Curb Records owner Mike Curb, who signed the band as he thought "Kiss You All Over" had potential to become a hit. The band's contract consisted of four albums, with Curb handling promotion and Warner Bros. Records handling distribution for all four. Exile then began recording more songs written by Chapman and English songwriter Nicky Chinn, along with six songs by Pennington and one song by Williams.

While recording his composition, "Ain't Got No Time", Danny Williams grew frustrated with the amount of control Chapman was exercising over the rest of the band in the studio, and was fired in late 1977. He then would be replaced by Sonny LeMaire, who would play bass and sang backup on "Never Gonna Stop" and "Stay with Me".

== Track listing ==
All songs written by James P. Pennington, except where noted.

Side one

1. "You Thrill Me" (Mike Chapman, Nicky Chinn) – 3:52
2. "Never Gonna Stop" – 5:39
3. "There's Been a Change" – 3:03
4. "You and Me" – 5:29

Side two

1. "Kiss You All Over" (Chapman, Chinn) – 4:54
2. "Ain't Got No Time" (Danny Williams) – 3:13
3. "Don't Do It" – 4:47
4. "One Step at a Time" – 3:11
5. "Stay with Me" – 2:57

== Personnel ==
Exile

- Jimmy Stokley – vocals (lead on side one tracks 3–4 / co-lead on side two track 1 and lead on side two tracks 2–3)
- J.P. Pennington – guitars, vocals (lead on side one tracks 1–2 / co-lead on side two track 1 and lead on side two tracks 4–5)
- Buzz Cornelison – keyboards, background vocals
- Marlon Hargis – keyboards, background vocals
- Sonny LeMaire – bass, background vocals (on "Never Gonna Stop" and "Stay With Me")
- Steve Goetzman – drums
- Danny Williams – bass, co-lead vocals (on side two track 1), background vocals (except for "Never Gonna Stop" and "Stay With Me")

Williams completed 7 of the 9 tracks, including "Kiss You All Over", before departing from the band. Sonny LeMaire finished the remaining tracks and joined the band.

== Charts ==
=== Weekly charts ===
Chart (1978–1979)	Peak position
Canada Top Albums/CDs (RPM)	12
German Albums (Offizielle Top 100)	27
Swedish Albums (Sverigetopplistan)	39
US Billboard 200	14

=== Year-end charts ===
Chart (1978)	Peak position
Canada Top Albums/CDs (RPM)	81

== Certifications ==
Region	Certification	Certified units/sales
United States (RIAA)	Gold	500,000^{^}
^{^} Shipments figures based on certification alone.
