= Crazy for Your Love =

Single by Exile

from the album Kentucky Hearts
- B-side: "Just in Case"
- Released: November 1984
- Genre: Country
- Length: 3:28
- Label: Epic
- Songwriters: J.P. Pennington; Sonny LeMaire
- Producer: Buddy Killen

Exile singles chronology
"Give Me One More Chance" (1984)	"Crazy for Your Love" (1984)	"She's a Miracle" (1985)

Music video
- "Crazy for Your Love" on YouTube

"Crazy for Your Love" is a song written by J.P. Pennington and Sonny LeMaire, and recorded by American country music group Exile. It was released in November 1984 as the second single from the album Kentucky Hearts. The song was Exile's fourth number one country hit. The single went to number one for one week.

The B-side, "Just in Case", was later a number 1 hit for The Forester Sisters in 1985.

== Charts ==
=== Weekly charts ===
Chart (1984–1985)	Peak position
US Hot Country Songs (Billboard)	1
Canada Country Singles (RPM)	1

=== Year-end charts ===
Chart (1985)	Position
US Hot Country Songs (Billboard)	29
