= Exile discography =

Exile discography may refer to:

- Exile (American band) discography, the discography of the American country and rock band
- Exile (Japanese band)#Discography, the discography of the Japanese pop band
