= The Girl Can't Help It (disambiguation) =

The Girl Can't Help It, 1956 film

The Girl Can't Help It may also refer to:

- "The Girl Can't Help It" (song), by Little Richard, from the above 1956 film
- "The Girl Can't Help It", 1986 song by Exile, from Greatest Hits (Exile album)
