= Super Love (Exile song) =

Single by Exile

from the album Hang On to Your Heart
- B-side: "Proud to Be Her Man
- Released: April 5, 1986
- Genre: Country
- Length: 2:44 (single); 3:53 (album)
- Label: Epic
- Songwriters: J.P. Pennington, Sonny LeMaire
- Producer: Buddy Killen

Exile singles chronology
| "I Could Get Used to You" (1985) | "Super Love" (1986) | "It'll Be Me" (1986) |

Music video
- "Super Love" on YouTube

"Super Love", also titled "I Got Love (Super-Duper Love)", is a song written by J.P. Pennington and Sonny LeMaire, and recorded by American country music group Exile. It was released in April 1986 as the third single from the album Hang On to Your Heart. The song reached number 14 on the Billboard Hot Country Singles & Tracks chart.

== Chart performance ==
| Chart (1986) | Peak position |
|---|---|
| US Hot Country Songs (Billboard) | 14 |
| Canada Country Singles (RPM) | 21 |
