= Just One Kiss (Exile song) =

Single by Exile

from the album Shelter from the Night
- B-side: "As Long as I Have Your Memory"
- Released: March 1988
- Genre: Country
- Length: 3:52
- Label: Epic
- Songwriters: Sonny LeMaire; J.P. Pennington
- Producer: Elliot Scheiner

Exile singles chronology
"Feel Like Foolin' Around" (1988)	"Just One Kiss" (1988)	"It's You Again" (1988)

Music video
- "Just One Kiss" on YouTube

"Just One Kiss" is a song written by J.P. Pennington and Sonny LeMaire, and recorded by American country music group Exile. It was released in March 1988 as the third single from their album Shelter from the Night. The song reached No. 9 on the Billboard Hot Country Singles chart in July 1988.

== Charts ==
=== Weekly charts ===
Chart (1988)	Peak position
US Hot Country Songs (Billboard)	9
Canada Country Singles (RPM)	3

=== Year-end charts ===
Chart (1988)	Position
Canadian RPM Country Tracks	28
US Hot Country Songs (Billboard)	97
