= It'll Be Me =

It'll Be Me may refer to

- "It'll Be Me" (Exile song) (1986)
- "It'll Be Me" (Jerry Lee Lewis song) (1957)
