= It's You Again (Exile song) =

Single by Exile

from the album Shelter from the Night
- B-side: "The Girl Can't Help It"
- Released: September 3, 1988
- Genre: Country
- Length: 3:39
- Label: Epic
- Songwriters: J.P. Pennington, Sonny LeMaire
- Producer: Elliott Scheiner

Exile singles chronology
"Just One Kiss" (1988)	"It's You Again" (1988)	"Keep It in the Middle of the Road" (1989)

Music video
- "It's You Again" on YouTube

"It's You Again" is a song recorded by American country music group Exile. It was released in September 1988 as the fourth single from the album Shelter from the Night. The song reached #21 on the Billboard Hot Country Singles & Tracks chart. The song was written by band members J.P. Pennington and Sonny LeMaire.

== Chart performance ==
Chart (1988)	Peak position
US Hot Country Songs (Billboard)	21
Canada Country Singles (RPM)	56
