= Give Me One More Chance =

Single by Exile

from the album Kentucky Hearts
- B-side: "Ain't That a Pity"
- Released: July 1984
- Genre: Country
- Length: 2:48
- Label: Epic
- Songwriters: J.P. Pennington; Sonny LeMaire
- Producer: Buddy Killen

Exile singles chronology
"I Don't Want to Be a Memory" (1984)	"Give Me One More Chance" (1984)	"Crazy for Your Love" (1984)

Music video
- "Give Me One More Chance" on YouTube

"Give Me One More Chance" is a song written by J.P. Pennington and Sonny LeMaire, and recorded by American country music group Exile. It was released in July 1984 as the first single from the album Kentucky Hearts. The song was Exile's third number one country hit. The single went to number one for one week and spent a total of fifteen weeks on the country chart.

== Charts ==
=== Weekly charts ===
Chart (1984)	Peak position
US Hot Country Songs (Billboard)	1
Canada Country Singles (RPM)	1

=== Year-end charts ===
Chart (1984)	Position
US Hot Country Songs (Billboard)	46
