= I Could Get Used to You =

Single by Exile

from the album Hang On to Your Heart
- B-side: "Practise Makes Perfect"
- Released: November 1985
- Genre: Country
- Length: 2:41
- Label: Epic
- Songwriters: J.P. Pennington; Sonny LeMaire
- Producer: Buddy Killen

Exile singles chronology
"Hang On to Your Heart" (1985)	"I Could Get Used to You" (1985)	"Super Love" (1986)

Music video
- "I Could Get Used to You" on YouTube

"I Could Get Used to You" is a song written by J.P. Pennington and Sonny LeMaire, and recorded by American country music group Exile. It was released in November 1985 as the second single from the album Hang On to Your Heart. The song was the seventh number one country hit for Exile. The single went to number one for one week and spent a total of fourteen weeks on the country chart.

== Chart performance ==
Chart (1985–1986)	Peak position
US Hot Country Songs (Billboard)	1
Canada Country Singles (RPM)	1
