= Hang On to Your Heart =

Single by Exile

from the album Hang On to Your Heart
- B-side: "She Likes Her Lovin'"
- Released: July 1985
- Genre: Country
- Length: 3:40
- Label: Epic
- Songwriters: J.P. Pennington; Sonny LeMaire
- Producer: Buddy Killen

Exile singles chronology
"She's a Miracle" (1985)	"Hang On to Your Heart" (1985)	"I Could Get Used to You" (1986)

Music video
- "Hang On to Your Heart" on YouTube

"Hang On to Your Heart" is a song written by J.P. Pennington and Sonny LeMaire, and recorded by American country music group Exile. It was released in July 1985 as the first single and title track from the album Hang On to Your Heart. The song was Exile's sixth number one country hit. The single went to number one for one week and spent a total of fifteen weeks on the country chart.

== Chart performance ==
Chart (1985)	Peak position
US Hot Country Songs (Billboard)	1
Canada Country Singles (RPM)	1
