= Burnin' Daylight =

American country music band (1995–1998)

- Origin: Nashville, Tennessee, United States
- Genre: Country
- Years active: 1995–1998
- Label: Curb
- Spinoff of: Exile, Southern Pacific
- Past members: Marc Beeson; Kurt Howell; Sonny LeMaire

Burnin' Daylight was an American country music band composed of Marc Beeson (lead vocals, guitar), Kurt Howell (keyboards, vocals), and Sonny LeMaire (bass guitar, vocals). Howell was formerly a member of Southern Pacific, and LeMaire a former member of Exile. Burnin' Daylight recorded one album on Curb Records in 1996, in addition to charting three singles on the Billboard Hot Country Singles & Tracks (now Hot Country Songs) charts. The highest of these, "Say Yes", reached No. 37.

== History ==
Burnin' Daylight was formed in 1995 by Sonny LeMaire, Kurt Howell, and Marc Beeson. LeMaire was formerly a member of Exile, and Howell, formerly of Southern Pacific and later a solo artist for Reprise Records. Marc Beeson was a Nashville songwriter who had previously charted a solo single on BNA Records in the early 1990s. The group had originally assumed the name The Loose Cannons, but was forced to change its name to Burnin' Daylight because another band had the same name. Originally, songwriters Trey Bruce and Rob Crosby were slated to be members of Burnin' Daylight as well. However, they decided to focus on their respective solo careers instead.

Initially, Burnin' Daylight was intended to be only a live band. They eventually sent a tape to Mike Curb, head of the Curb Records label, who signed the group in 1997. In April of that year, Burnin' Daylight released its eponymous debut album. They charted three singles on the Billboard country music charts, including a Top 40 hit in "Say Yes". Robert Loy of Country Standard Time gave the album a negative review, criticizing it as formulaic in nature.

In 1997, the Academy of Country Music nominated Burnin' Daylight for the Top New Vocal Duo or Group award, but the band lost to Ricochet.

Since disbanding in 1998, former bass guitarist Sonny LeMaire has written several singles for other artists, including the Number One hit "Beautiful Mess" by Diamond Rio, "She Thinks She Needs Me" by Andy Griggs, and "Fall" by Clay Walker (also recorded by Kimberley Locke). All of these were collaborations with Shane Minor and Clay Mills. LeMaire has also since reunited with Exile.

== Discography ==
=== Albums ===
Title	Album details	Peak positions
Title	Album details	US Country
Burnin' Daylight	Release date: April 15, 1997; Label: Curb Records	74

=== Singles ===
Year	Single	Peak chart positions		Album
Year	Single	US Country	CAN Country	Album
1996	"Love Worth Fighting For"	49	—	Burnin' Daylight
1997	"Say Yes"	37	84	Burnin' Daylight
1997	"Live to Love Again"	58	96	Burnin' Daylight
1997	"Nice Work (If You Can Get It)"	—	—	Burnin' Daylight
1998	"Wreckin' Ball"	—	—	—N/a
"—" denotes releases that did not chart

=== Music videos ===
Year	Video	Director
1996	"Love Worth Fighting For"	Chris Rogers

== Awards and nominations ==
Year	Organization	Award	Nominee/Work	Result
1997	Academy of Country Music Awards	Top New Vocal Group or Duet	Burnin' Daylight	Nominated
