= The Part of Me That Needs You Most =

Single by Exile

from the album All There Is
- B-side: "Let's Do It Again"
- Released: October 1979
- Genre: Soft rock
- Label: Warner Bros./Curb Records
- Songwriters: Mike Chapman; Nicky Chinn
- Producer: Mike Chapman

Exile singles chronology
"How Could This Go Wrong" (1979)	"The Part of Me That Needs You Most" (1979)	"Too Proud to Cry" (1980)

"The Part of Me That Needs You Most" is a 1979 song performed by the group Exile. It was written by Mike Chapman and Nicky Chinn. The song was included on the band's album All There Is, and it was the second of three singles released from the LP.

Also known as "The Part of Me", the song was a major hit in South Africa, where it reached number two. It also charted in New Zealand, where it reached number 10.

== Jay Black version ==
In 1980, Jay Black (the former lead singer of the band Jay and the Americans) released his own version of "The Part of Me That Needs You Most", produced by Joel Diamond for Silver Blue Productions Ltd. The song spent four weeks on the Billboard Hot 100, peaking at number 98 in September 1980.

== B.J. Thomas cover ==
In 1985, B. J. Thomas covered "The Part of Me That Needs You Most". His version became a hit on the country charts, reaching number 61 in the U.S., and number 57 in Canada.

== Chart history ==
=== Weekly charts ===
Exile

Chart (1979–80)	Peak position
Australia (Kent Music Report)	81
New Zealand (RIANZ)	10
South Africa (Springbok)	2

Jay Black cover

Chart (1980)	Peak position
US Billboard Hot 100	98

B.J. Thomas cover

Chart (1985)	Peak position
Canada RPM Country	57
US Billboard Hot Country Songs	61

=== Year-end charts ===
Chart (1980)	Rank
South Africa	15
