= Exile (American band) =

American rock and country band

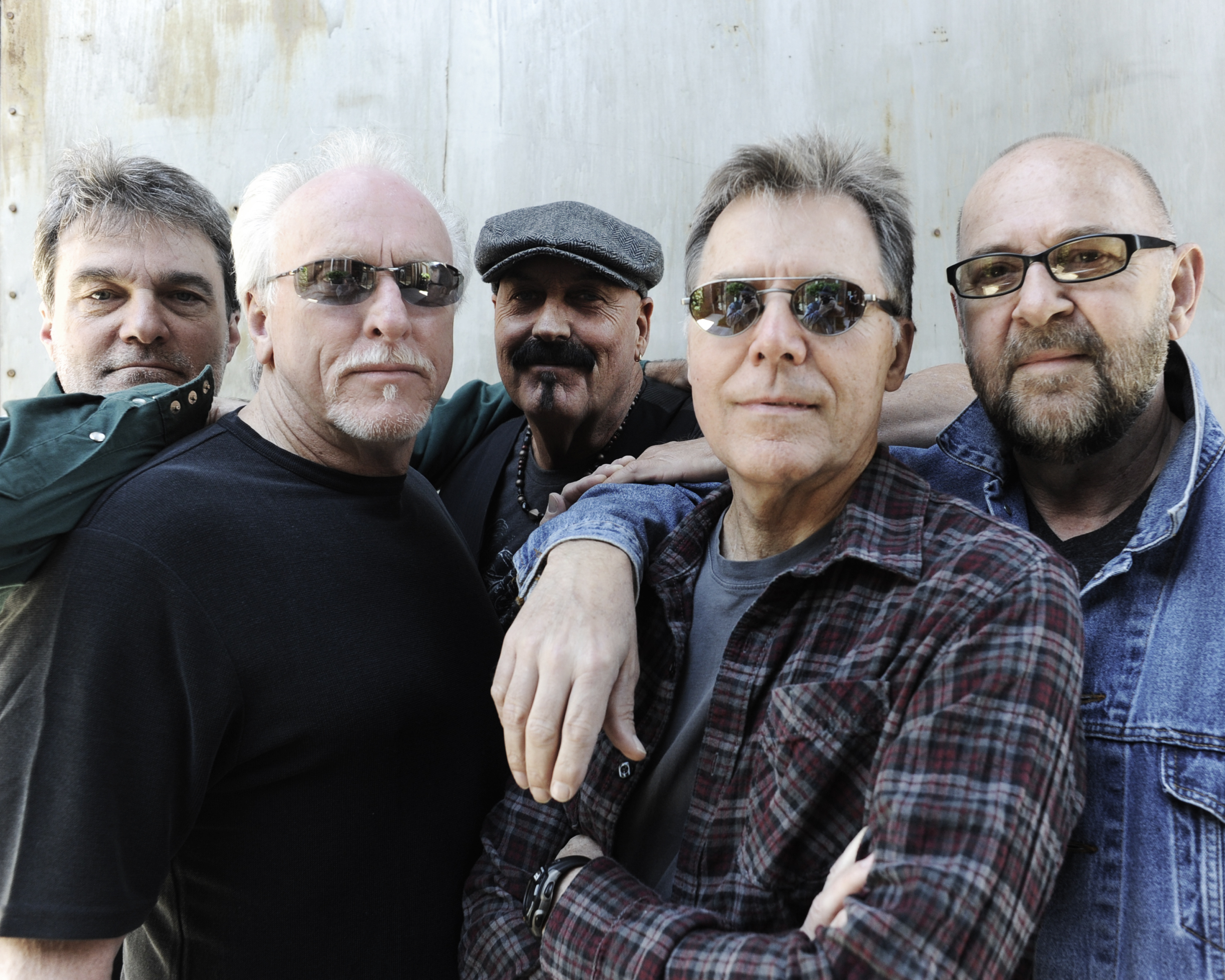
- Exile in 2013 (L–R: Steve Goetzman, Les Taylor, Marlon Hargis, Sonny LeMaire, and J.P. Pennington)

Background information
- Also known as: The Exiles; Jimmy Stokley and the Exiles
- Origin: Richmond, Kentucky, U.S.
- Genres: Country, rock
- Works: Discography
- Years active: 1963–1995, 2005–present
- Labels: Jimbo; Monument; Date; Columbia; Wooden Nickel; Atco; Warner Bros.; Curb; Epic; Arista Nashville; Intersound; Clearwater
- Spinoffs: Burnin' Daylight
- Members: J.P. Pennington; Marlon Hargis; Steve Goetzman; Sonny LeMaire; Les Taylor
- Past members: See List of members
- Website: exile.biz

Exile, formerly the Exiles, is an American band founded in Richmond, Kentucky, in 1963. The band consists of J.P. Pennington and Les Taylor, both of whom are guitarists and vocalists, along with Sonny LeMaire (bass guitar, vocals), Marlon Hargis (keyboards), and Steve Goetzman (drums). With a founding membership including original lead singer Jimmy Stokley, the band played cover songs and local events in Kentucky for a number of years before becoming a backing band on the touring revue Caravan of Stars. After a series of failed singles on various labels, Exile achieved mainstream success in 1978 with "Kiss You All Over", a number-one single on the Billboard Hot 100. This iteration of the band mostly played soft rock and pop music.

After Stokley was let go due to tensions with producer Mike Chapman, his role as lead vocalist was concurrently assumed by Mark Gray and Taylor. However, Gray departed after three years to begin a solo career. Exile transitioned to country music at the beginning of the 1980s, with Pennington and Taylor as vocalists alongside LeMaire, Hargis, and Goetzman. This lineup was featured on their 1983 album Exile, their first as a country band and first on Epic Records. Between then and 1987, Exile had ten number-one singles on the Billboard Hot Country Singles (now Hot Country Songs) charts, as well as a number one on Top Country Albums with Kentucky Hearts in 1984.

Hargis, Pennington, and Taylor left the band between 1987 and 1989, with LeMaire and multi-instrumentalist Paul Martin alternating on lead vocals for two albums on Arista Nashville between 1990 and 1991. During the early 1990s, both Pennington and Taylor recorded as solo artists. Exile disbanded in 1995, after which LeMaire recorded one album in the group Burnin' Daylight. Individual members of Exile played a number of informal shows between the late 1990s and the early 2000s decade, but the early-1980s lineup did not re-establish until 2008. Exile has continued to tour and record albums under this lineup in the 2010s and 2020s.

Exile's sound is defined by vocal harmony with rock and pop influences. Most of their country music releases in the 1980s are co-written by Pennington and LeMaire, and feature the band playing all the instruments by themselves instead of using session musicians. Songs of theirs have also been covered by Alabama, Huey Lewis and the News, Dave & Sugar, and the Forester Sisters.

== History ==
Exile was founded in Richmond, Kentucky, in 1963 as the Exiles, by a group of students attending Madison High School. Musicologist Randy Westbrook, in the book 50 Years of Exile: The Story of a Band in Transition, describes the band's origins as "murky" due to conflicting accounts among early members. According to him, founding drummer Mack Davenport played high school dances in the band Kings of Rhythm. Davenport recalled this band consisting of Paul Smith Jr. on bass guitar, Doug Jones on lead guitar, Ronnie Hall on vocals, Doug Begley on saxophone, and Billy Luxon on trumpet. They played jazz, soul, and blues. After an unknown number of performances, this group became the Fascinations, which consisted of Davenport, Smith, Luxon, Jones, and percussionist Eddie Rhodus, with Hall and Jimmy Stokley both providing vocals. Rhodus died in a car accident and Jones departed in 1963, at which point (according to Westbrook) the five remaining members dissolved that band and founded The Exiles. It entered a local contest with a recording session as its grand prize. The Exiles lost to a band called the Digits, although after the competition, Jones left for undisclosed reasons and the other members recruited the Digits' guitarist Mike Howard to take his place. The name "The Exiles" was inspired by the Cuban exodus or exile of Cubans to the United States following the Cuban Revolution.

Originally, Stokley and Hall alternated as lead vocalists. However, the other band members thought Stokley was "much more dynamic" and fired Hall in 1964. J.P. Pennington joined soon after; he was previously in a local band called the Le Sabers, whose lead singer Leroy Pullins was later known for his 1966 novelty hit "I'm a Nut". The Exiles persuaded Pennington to play bass guitar, allowing Smith to switch to rhythm guitar. They performed publicly for the first time in 1964 at Irvine-McDowell Park in Richmond, with a lineup consisting of Stokley, Howard, Smith, Davenport, Pennington, and Luxon. Most of their other early performances were at sock hops and high school dances, where they covered artists such as the Temptations and James Brown. Stokley wanted the band to have a keyboardist and selected Buzz Cornelison, who had briefly played with the Kings of Rhythm. After Cornelison joined, the band began performing local gigs throughout Kentucky.

One of the band's recurring gigs was at a youth center in Martin, Kentucky, whose owner, David Grigsby, encouraged the Exiles to submit a demo to Nashville radio station WLAC disc jockey John Richbourg (who used the name John R. Grigsby on air). Richbourg arranged for the band to record their first single in 1965 on Jimbo Records: "The Answer to Her Prayers", a song that Smith wrote. They performed a number of gigs at a nightclub in Richmond called Speck's, which led to them becoming the house band there. As Luxon, Pennington, Cornelison, and Howard all contributed backing vocals, the Exiles began incorporating cover songs with more vocal harmony, such as the Young Rascals and the Beach Boys. They also covered soul music to take advantage of Stokley's "raspy" voice, which Westbrook compared to Wilson Pickett. Pennington quit the Exiles in 1965, as he was 16 years old at the time and his parents thought he was too young to be in a band. Following Pennington's departure, Smith reverted to bassist, creating a six-piece lineup with Howard, Davenport, Luxon, Stokley, and Cornelison.

== 1965–1972: Caravan of Stars and early singles ==
In late 1965, Richbourg took the band to Nashville to record material he had selected and produced, including the single "Alligator Time". It featured double entendre lyrics and spoken-word ad-libs. The single was credited to Jimmy Stokley and the Exiles, and was issued through Monument Records. Grigsby also contacted Peggy Rogers, a manager for radio and television host Dick Clark. After seeing the band perform at Speck's, she encouraged it to travel to Cincinnati Music Hall in Cincinnati, Ohio, to accompany Lou Christie at a stop on Clark's Caravan of Stars touring revue. The Exiles rehearsed with female backing vocalists for a performance of his single "Lightnin' Strikes". During rehearsal, Cornelison realized the vocalists had been singing wrong notes and taught them the correct melody. As Christie was not present during rehearsals, he did not notice this correction until the performance. Afterward, he asked who had corrected the arrangement; when Cornelison stated he was responsible, Christie asked him to write down the correct notes, a move that impressed Rogers.

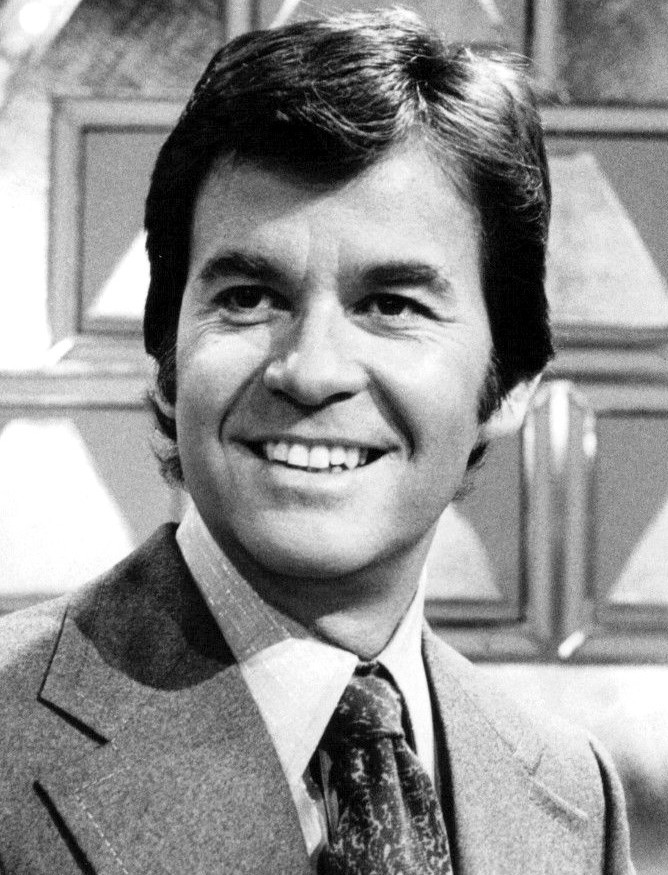
Exile was a backing band for Caravan of Stars, a touring revue hosted by Dick Clark (pictured circa 1974).

In 1966, Rogers asked the Exiles to accompany a Caravan of Stars show at Stoll Field in Lexington, Kentucky, after a truck delivering instruments to the show broke down. They continued to tour on Caravan of Stars throughout October and November, backing acts such as the Yardbirds. John Caldwell, a Caravan of Stars manager, encouraged the band to travel to New York City in 1967 to record for Date Records. These featured the Exiles solely as vocalists, with the instruments played entirely by session musicians. They recorded a cover of the Young Rascals's "What Is the Reason", as well as the originals "Come Out, Come Out, Whoever You Are" and "I'd Love to Give My Love Away". None of these singles were successful. Caldwell also asked the band to move to New York City, so the band would not have to travel between there and Kentucky while recording for Date Records. Cornelison refused and quit, as he wanted to rejoin college and study musical theater. He was replaced by Bernie Faulkner, who had played with them at Speck's. In addition to the keyboard, Faulkner contributed on guitar and saxophone. Smith was drafted after the band's move to New York City, leaving the Exiles without a bass player. He was briefly replaced by Larry Davis, whom the other members met while in New York, but he quickly left due to personality conflicts. As a result, Howard contacted Pennington and successfully asked him to rejoin. After three months in New York, the Exiles returned to Kentucky and resumed performing at Speck's.

Due to their success backing Caravan of Stars, they were invited to do so again in 1967 and 1968. They performed twelve minutes of cover songs as an opening act before accompanying other acts on the bill, such as Freddy Cannon, Brian Hyland, and Paul Revere and the Raiders. After the 1968 tour ended, they were contacted by talent agent Mark Alan, who invited them to return to New York for another session with Date Records. Unlike the previous session, they were allowed to play their own instruments. These sessions resulted in one unsuccessful single, "Mary on the Beach". The band was dissatisfied with their living conditions in New York and left again in early 1969. Soon afterward, Howard was also drafted and served in Vietnam for eleven months. He declined to rejoin, as he was disappointed by the second trip to New York and the lack of original material in the band's repertoire. Howard became a construction worker and then worked in a post office before retiring in 2009. Cornelison then rejoined after being turned down for a job at a lounge in northern Kentucky. As a result, the Exiles did not have a lead guitarist at this point, instead relying on both Cornelison and Faulkner as keyboardists. In addition, Cornelison played trumpet, while Faulkner also played saxophone and rhythm guitar.

Alan booked the Exiles as an opening act for Tommy James and the Shondells at a show in Baton Rouge, Louisiana, in 1969. Lead singer Tommy James invited them to travel to New York a third time, as he wanted them to record a song he had written titled "Church Street Soul Revival". Pennington alternated with James on lead guitar in addition to his usual role as bassist. The song was released in 1969 on Columbia Records and became the band's first chart entry, making number four on the Bubbling Under Hot 100 Singles charts. In 1970, the band was recommended to songwriter and producer Buddy Buie, who also wanted to record a song with them. This song, "Put Your Hands Together", featured the Exiles accompanied by the Atlanta Rhythm Section, of which Buie was their manager and producer. As this song was also unsuccessful, the band began expressing disappointment with Alan's management. In addition, Pennington had begun writing original songs, but Stokley and Cornelison were not interested in writing songs, and the original material proved unpopular in concerts. Davenport quit in late 1971 or late 1972, attributing his departure to the band's continued lack of success. He went on to become a bartender, and was replaced on drums by Bobby Johns. Pennington left a second time in 1972, as he wanted to move to California with his cousin. While the other band members expressed a desire to break up, they remained together at Stokley's insistence, and Johns recruited guitarist Kenny Weir and bassist Bill Kennon. Pennington returned to the Exiles after only a few months, assuming the role of guitarist this time. As a result, Kennon departed and Weir switched to bass. Westbrook said that this lineup allowed a more hard rock sound in addition to the existing vocal harmonies, as well as the presence of Faulkner's saxophone and Cornelison and Luxon's trumpets, for a sound "more intricate than what was expected from the average bar band".

== Pop music career ==
=== 1972–1975: Wooden Nickel Records ===
In 1972, the band was offered a recording contract by Chicago-based Wooden Nickel Records. As they thought "the Exiles" sounded "dated", the band shortened its name to Exile. Their first Wooden Nickel album, the self-titled Exile, was released in 1973. Wooden Nickel co-owner Bill Traut served as producer. He allowed the band to perform all of the instruments and vocals by themselves; except for some vocal overdubbing, the entire album was recorded in only one take. Despite this, Traut selected most of the material, which included covers of Seals and Crofts, Van Morrison, and Todd Rundgren, and he wanted the band to perform in a blue-eyed soul style. The album included only two original songs: Pennington wrote "Do What You Think You Should", while he, Stokley, and Traut co-wrote "Hold Tight, Woman". Wooden Nickel released a second album in late 1973 titled Stage Pass. It included two songs written by Pennington and one by Johns, while the rest of the album was once more composed of cover songs. Among the covers was one of the Beatles's "We Can Work It Out", arranged by Cornelison. Also included was a live recording of Jeff Beck's "New Ways/Train Train", which featured a number of solos from all members. Both of the Wooden Nickel albums were unsuccessful commercially, and the label dropped the band by year's end.

Following their departure from Wooden Nickel, the band lost three members in quick succession. Faulkner left in late 1973 due to disillusionment over the failure of the Wooden Nickel releases and began working at Lemco Studios, a recording studio in Lexington, Kentucky. He charted one single in 1983 as one-third of the country music vocal group Hazard. Weir left at an unknown point prior to late 1974; according to Westbrook, neither Cornelison nor Pennington could remember why Weir exited the band. Danny Williams replaced Weir on bass guitar in 1974. Luxon quit around the time Williams joined, citing the lack of horn parts on the Wooden Nickel albums. He went on to own a nightclub in Richmond until he sold it in 1993. Taking Faulkner's place on keyboards was Marlon Hargis, a native of Somerset, Kentucky. He had become acquainted with Exile through his work as a keyboardist at Lemco Studios, where members of Exile had joined in on recording commercials, demos, and country music albums by local artists.

=== 1975–1978: "Try It On" and "Kiss You All Over" ===
By the mid-1970s, the band—at the time composed of Stokley, Pennington, Cornelison, Hargis, Williams, and Johns—had moved back to Lexington, Kentucky. They recorded a number of demos in an attempt to secure another recording contract. One such demo was submitted to Mike Chapman, an Australian record producer who was looking to begin working with American artists. Working with Chapman, the band recorded a disco song called "Try It On" for Atco Records, which charted at number 97 on the Billboard Hot 100 in 1977. As the song was not successful, Johns quit around the time of its release and was replaced by Steve Goetzman, who at the time was Pennington's roommate. Johns later joined the rock band Roadmaster. Although Chapman had initially chosen not to work with Exile again following the failure of "Try It On", his wife persuaded him to give the band a second chance, as she liked their music and thought the band members were more polite to him than other acts were. Chapman invited the band to the Forum, a recording studio in Covington, Kentucky, where he presented them with a song he had written called "Kiss You All Over". The band spent nearly an entire day in the studio recording it, owing to Chapman's "demanding" production style. Chapman had great difficulty with recording Stokley's voice due to his raspy delivery and poor sense of pitch, and asked Pennington to sing the lines on which he could not get a satisfactory vocal from Stokley.

Through a connection with music journalist Nola Leone, Chapman was able to contact Curb Records owner Mike Curb, who signed the band as he thought "Kiss You All Over" had potential to become a hit. The band's contract consisted of four albums, with Curb handling promotion and Warner Bros. Records handling distribution. Exile began recording more songs written by Chapman and English songwriter Nicky Chinn, along with six by Pennington and one by Williams. These, along with "Kiss You All Over", comprised the band's first Warner and Curb album Mixed Emotions (1978). During the recording sessions for "Ain't Got No Time", Williams became frustrated with the amount of control Chapman was exercising over the rest of the band; as a result, Williams was fired and replaced by Sonny LeMaire, who knew Hargis through a number of cover bands the two had worked with in the early 1970s. LeMaire played and sang backing vocals on two tracks on Mixed Emotions: "Never Gonna Stop" and "Stay with Me". Released in mid-1978, Mixed Emotions featured elements of disco, funk, and pop rock.

Curb and Warner released "Kiss You All Over" as the album's first single. While initially unpopular at live shows, it began climbing the Billboard charts due to radio airplay. Westbrook attributes the song's success to its sexually suggestive lyrics, an observation also made by Tom Breihan of Stereogum in 2020. "Kiss You All Over" reached number one on the Billboard Hot 100 in September 1978 and held the position for four weeks. The song was also an international success, reaching number one on the Kent Music Report charts in Australia, and number six on the UK Singles Chart. Its success led to Exile appearing on variety shows such as The Midnight Special. Rogers also made arrangements to sign Exile with William Morris Agency, a talent agency that assisted in booking the band as an opening act for Aerosmith and Heart. The labels issued two more singles from Mixed Emotions. "Never Gonna Stop" did not chart, while "You Thrill Me" reached number 40 on the Hot 100. "Never Gonna Stop" was later recorded by Linda Clifford, whose version was sampled on Tupac Shakur's "All Eyez on Me". "Stay with Me" was later covered by Dave & Sugar in 1979.

=== 1978–1981: All There Is, Don't Leave Me This Way, and Heart & Soul ===
Exile began working on their second Warner album, All There Is, in late 1978 before releasing it in 1979. During the sessions, Chapman faced increasing difficulty recording Stokley's voice, as the singer had developed nodules on his vocal cords and was weakened by hepatitis. As a result, Chapman asked Pennington and LeMaire to sing lead vocals on some tracks instead, with both band members later noting that Chapman would often make them record as many as fifty takes until the vocal track was to his satisfaction. In addition, Chapman wanted the band to record disco, as that genre was popular at the time and he thought doing so would renew interest in their music after the failure of "You Thrill Me". The recording sessions featured a large number of synthesizers and drum machines. The opening and closing tracks "How Could This Go Wrong" and "Too Proud to Cry" were both over eight minutes long, featuring a number of disco-influenced instrument solos. "Too Proud to Cry" was also Hargis's only writing credit. "Let's Do It Again" served as the lead single, reaching 88 on the Billboard Hot 100. Neither "The Part of Me That Needs You Most" nor "Too Proud to Cry" charted in the United States, although the former was a minor chart hit in Australia. Jay Black covered "The Part of Me That Needs You Most" in 1980, as did B.J. Thomas in 1985.

Due to the difficulties experienced during the All There Is recording sessions, Stokley was fired at Chapman's insistence shortly after the album's release. He was briefly replaced by vocalist and guitarist Randy Rickman, who only lasted in the group for "a couple of months" due to his style not working with the rest of the band. After this, the band found vocalists Mark Gray and Les Taylor, who also contributed on keyboards and guitar, respectively. Chapman had recommended Gray after discovering him in Los Angeles. Gray's joining briefly led to the unusual scenario of Exile having three keyboardists: him, Cornelison, and Hargis. Pennington had chosen Taylor due to his involvement in a number of local bands that had played at Martin Youth Center and Speck's. Both Gray and Taylor began auditioning with Exile in August 1979. They made their debut on Exile's third Curb/Warner album, Don't Leave Me This Way (1980), which featured them and Pennington alternating on lead vocals. LeMaire thought Chapman had become increasingly focused on more successful bands with whom he collaborated, such as Blondie and the Knack, and had therefore lost interest in promoting and writing songs for Exile. In addition, due to his involvement with these bands, his sound engineer Peter Coleman took over as producer. Unlike Chapman, Coleman was willing to accept their suggestions on how each song should sound. Because of this, LeMaire later considered Don't Leave Me This Way the best of the band's Warner albums. The album's two singles, "You're Good for Me" and "Take Me Down", both made the Bubbling Under Hot 100 singles chart in 1980. Both the latter and the album track "The Closer You Get" were later recorded by Alabama, whose versions topped the Billboard Hot Country Singles (now Hot Country Songs) charts in the early 1980s. In 1981, Cornelison left the band as he "became more and more estranged" from the soft rock and country pop influences of the album. He re-enrolled at Eastern Kentucky University, where he acquired a master's degree in English, in addition to working in local theater productions and running a craft shop with his family.

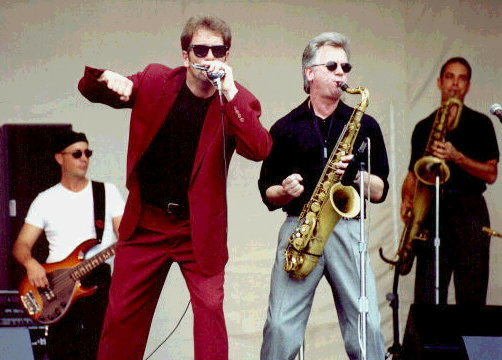
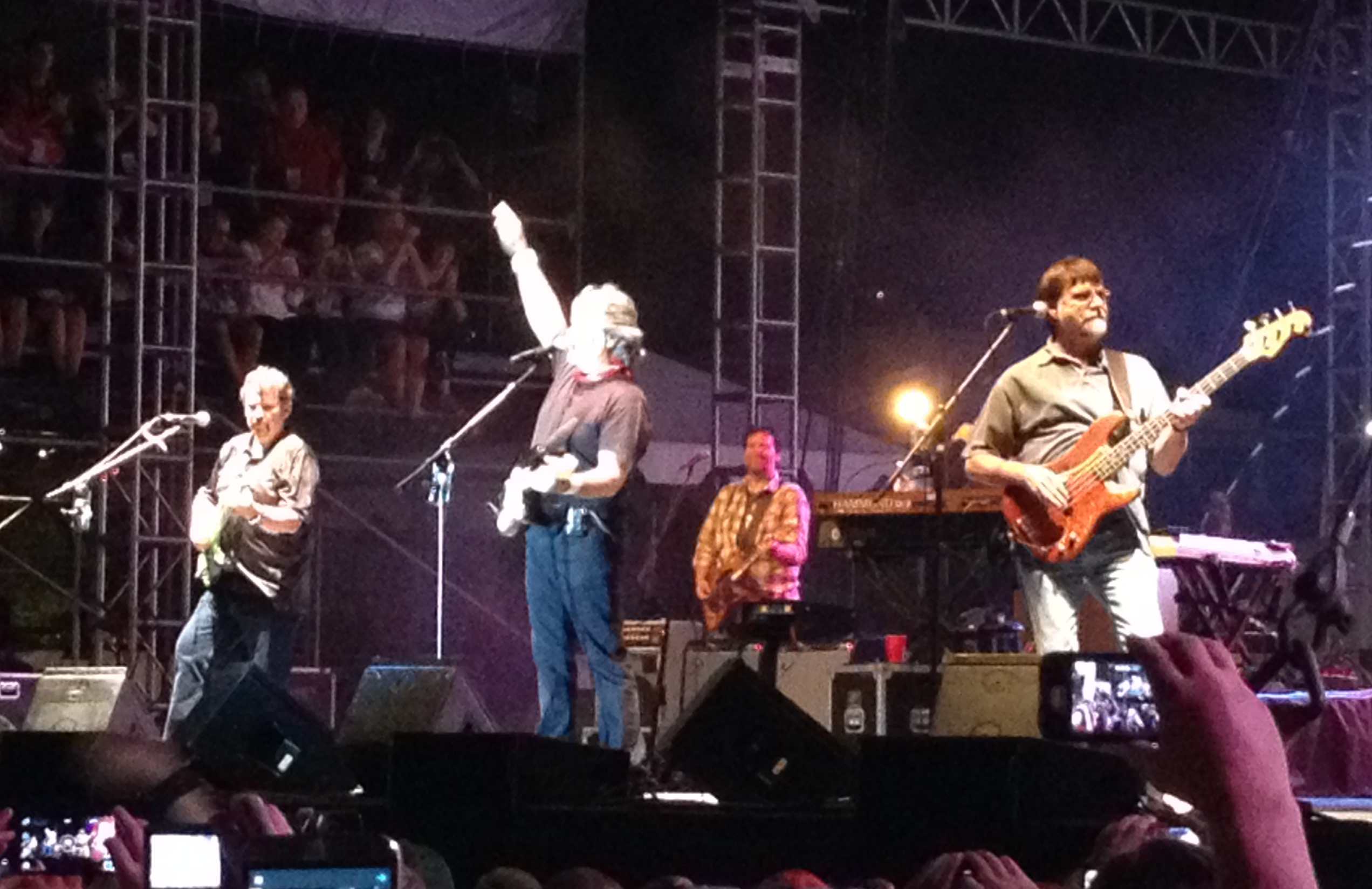
Early single releases by Exile were later successful for Huey Lewis and the News (left) and Alabama (right).

Exile finished their contract with Warner and Curb in 1981 with Heart & Soul. The band reinstated Chapman as producer, as they thought working with him would help them become successful again, due to the band members' perception that Coleman was not strong at selecting songs with potential as hits. LeMaire and Pennington wrote several songs on the album, including "Take This Heart", which was later recorded by Kenny Rogers. Heart & Soul continued to feature elements of soft rock, but Westbrook also said the album showed country influences on tracks such as "One More Night for Love". The album's only charted single release was its title track, "Heart and Soul" (written by Chapman and Chinn), which entered the Bubbling Under Hot 100 singles chart upon release. This song would later be covered by Huey Lewis and the News, whose version was a top-ten pop hit in 1983. "What Kind of Love Is This" was also a single, but it did not chart.

== Country music career ==
Exile was dropped from Warner and Curb in 1981 when their four-album contract expired. Westbrook attributes the band's commercial decline due to a decrease in the popularity of soft rock. As a result of this, their manager Jim Morey suggested between late 1982 and early 1983 that the band begin recording country music due to that genre's increasing popularity, as well as the success of "Take Me Down" and "The Closer You Get" through their covers by Alabama. While Pennington was interested in the band pursuing this genre, Hargis and Goetzman were initially outspoken against such a change. Despite the latter two's reservations, the band began rehearsing covers of artists such as Merle Haggard and George Jones. This led to them playing a country set at the Rebel Room, a club inside a bowling alley in Lexington, Kentucky, before moving to another club called Breeding's. The band also played a number of shows in South Africa, where "Kiss You All Over" had become popular in the interim.

Gray left the band at this point, as he wanted to become a solo artist. As a result, Pennington and Taylor became the band's two lead vocalists. After writing a number of songs for Janie Fricke, Gray was signed to Columbia Records in 1983 as a solo artist. He charted five top-ten singles on the Billboard country charts between 1984 and 1986, two of which ("Left Side of the Bed" and "Diamond in the Dust") were co-written by LeMaire. Gray died of undisclosed causes at the age of 64 in 2016.

=== 1984–1985: Switch to country with Exile and Kentucky Hearts ===
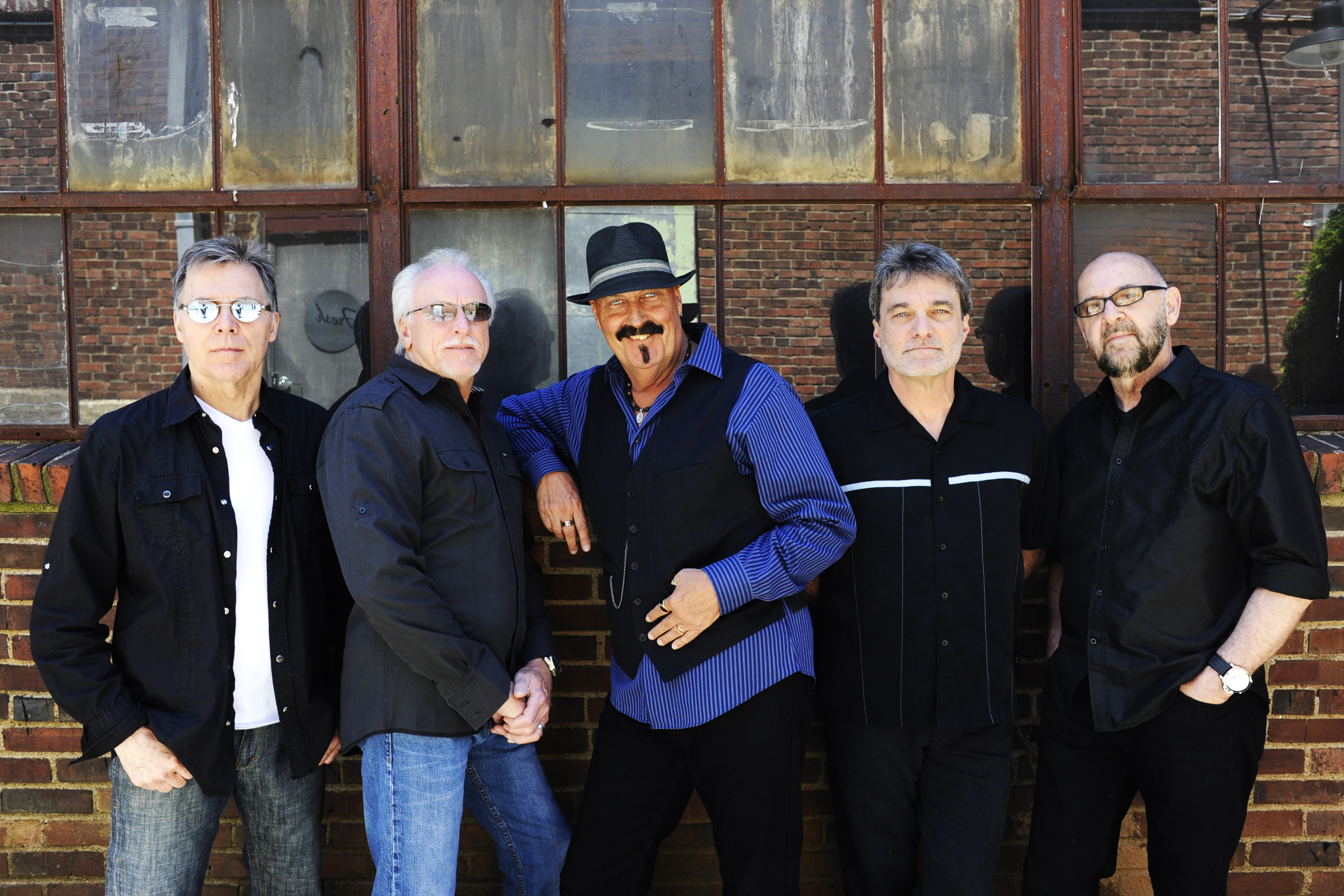
The band's lineup after switching to country in the early 1980s, and again since 2008, has consisted of (from left to right) Sonny LeMaire, Les Taylor, Marlon Hargis, Steve Goetzman, and J.P. Pennington.

Through Morey, the band arranged a meeting with Nashville-based producer and publisher Buddy Killen, who invited them to play a number of shows at a Nashville-based club called the Stockyard in order to aid in the band's transition to country. These shows were attended by representatives of major Nashville labels including those of Epic Records, who signed the band in 1983. At this point, the band consisted of Pennington, LeMaire, Taylor, Hargis, and Goetzman. Their first Epic album, Exile, came out that same year. Killen produced the album and Hargis served as sound engineer. Hargis said Killen was willing to let the band play all of their own instruments, as opposed to most country bands at the time, who relied on session musicians for their albums. The album featured Taylor and Pennington alternating as lead vocalists and songwriters, with Ricky Skaggs being the only outside musician on the entire project. Although Gray had left by this point, he was a co-writer on two tracks. While their first country release "High Cost of Leaving" reached the Top 30 on the Billboard country chart, its follow-ups "Woke Up in Love" and "I Don't Want to Be a Memory" both went to number one between late 1983 and early 1984. Exile also reached number ten on the Top Country Albums chart upon release. The success of this album led to Pennington and LeMaire putting increased focus on their collaborative songwriting, while also restarting the band's touring schedule. Exile was nominated in 1983 for Top Vocal Group by the Academy of Country Music (ACM), a nomination they would receive again in 1984, 1985, and 1987. They would also be nominated by the Country Music Association (CMA) for Vocal Group of the Year in every year from 1984 to 1987, as well as Instrumental Group of the Year in 1984 and 1985.

The band's second country album, Kentucky Hearts, was released in 1984. It was their only number-one album on the Billboard country albums chart. As with the previous album, Killen served as producer. Pennington and LeMaire wrote the album themselves except for "Comin' Apart at the Seams", which Taylor wrote with Jerry Marcum. All three singles, "Give Me One More Chance", "Crazy for Your Love", and "She's a Miracle", went to number one. LeMaire later commented favorably on his and Pennington's use of rhythms and wordplay in the former two songs' compositions, and observed that Charley Pride "loved" the latter. The band also produced a music video for "She's a Miracle", which aired on the television network CMT. Tom Carter of the Lexington, Kentucky, Herald-Leader wrote that the band was "more mellow and confident" than on previous albums, while also praising the harmony and instrumentation. Killen also had the band play instruments and perform backing vocals on Ronnie McDowell's mid-1985 hit "Love Talks", and the Forester Sisters covered "Just in Case" (a track from Kentucky Hearts) and took it to number one in 1985.

=== 1985–1986: Death of Stokley and Hang On to Your Heart ===
After the release of Kentucky Hearts, the band members were informed of former lead singer Jimmy Stokley's continued decline in health. In response, they held a charity concert in Richmond which raised $18,000 toward Stokley's medical bills. Other former members, such as Davenport, Cornelison, Luxon, and Howard were in attendance as well. The members had intended for Stokley to perform with the group, but he was too ill to do so. Stokley died of hepatitis at the age of 41 in August 1985.

This was followed in 1986 by the release of Exile's third Epic album, Hang On to Your Heart. Pennington and LeMaire wrote the entirety of the album, and it accounted for five singles. These were "Hang On to Your Heart", "I Could Get Used to You", "Super Love", "It'll Be Me", and "She's Too Good to Be True". Of these, all except "Super Love" went to number one on the Billboard country charts. Although Taylor had sung lead on a number of album tracks prior to this point, "It'll Be Me" and "She's Too Good to Be True" were the first singles to feature him on lead vocals instead of Pennington. LeMaire said that "It'll Be Me" was specifically written with the intent of having Taylor sing it, due to him having a higher vocal range than Pennington. In addition, the track "Music" features Pennington rapping. Due to the success of "I Could Get Used to You" and the Forester Sisters' rendition of "Just in Case", which reached the number-one position six weeks prior to the former, Pennington and LeMaire were both awarded as top country songwriters of the year by Broadcast Music, Inc. (BMI). Walter Tunis of the Lexington Herald-Leader wrote that the "playing is efficient and economical", highlighting the number of up-tempo tracks and the album's relatively short length.

=== Mid–late 1980s: Shelter from the Night and departing members ===
Following Hang On to Your Heart, Hargis thought there was "too much partying" among the other band members, and that the label wanted to have industry professionals take his place as the band's sound engineer. In response, he quit in early 1987 and stayed in Nashville to own a music store. Lee Carroll took his place on keyboards. Carroll had been serving as a backing musician for the Judds, and had met the members of Exile a number of times in this capacity before Pennington invited him to join. Executive Roy Wunsch had taken over as the head of Epic Records around this point, and told the band members that he thought their sound had "sameness". Similarly, Goetzman said that radio disc jockeys had thought that too many of Exile's songs sounded similar to each other, and that perception in the country music scene had become increasingly negative toward Killen's production style. As a result, Wunsch and other Epic executives ordered the band to fire Killen as their producer and begin seeking songs by other writers than Taylor and Pennington.

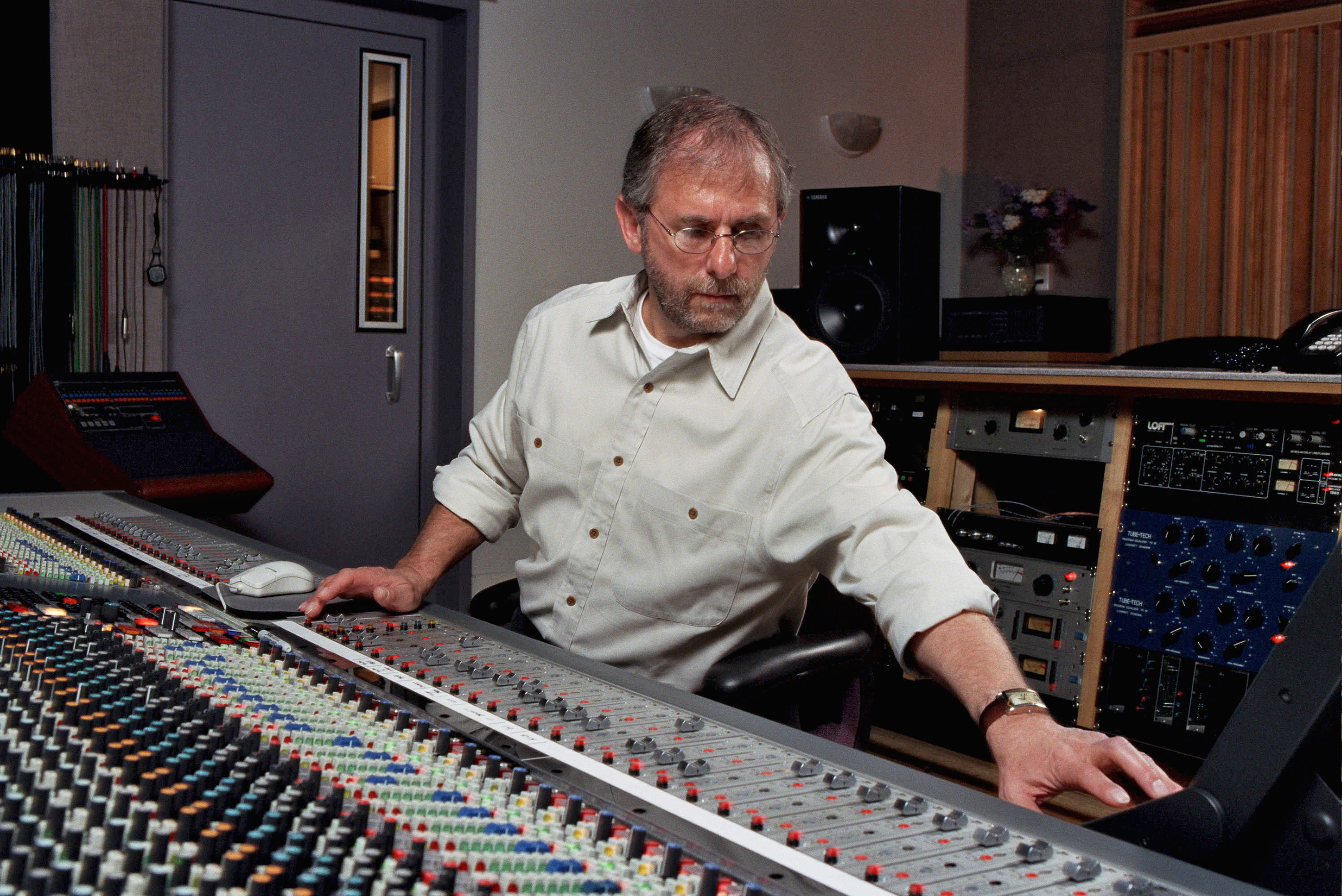
Elliot Scheiner produced the band's 1987 album Shelter from the Night.

The band chose Elliot Scheiner, a pop producer who had worked with Bruce Hornsby and Steely Dan, among others, to produce their final Epic album Shelter from the Night (1987). Pennington thought that employing a pop producer would help the band change their sound, as he had seen the crossover success Restless Heart had with "I'll Still Be Loving You" on pop formats. Scheiner selected three songs by outside writers: the title track, "Fly on the Wall" (written by Hornsby and Bernie Taupin), and John Farrar's "She's Already Gone", all of which were sung by Taylor. The album was recorded in June 1987 at Scheiner's studio in Stamford, Connecticut. Westbrook describes the album as "uneven" due to Scheiner's involvement and Carroll's use of synthesizers. While the lead single "I Can't Get Close Enough" accounted for the band's tenth number-one single on Billboard, the later releases were unsuccessful. "Feel Like Foolin' Around" fell short of the country top 40, while "Just One Kiss" and "It's You Again" were minor chart entries as well. Carroll attributed the single's failures to the success of the Judds and Randy Travis, both of whom were having success with neotraditional country at the time. Norman Rowe of the Richmond Times-Dispatch thought the album contained influences of Southern rock and rhythm and blues, while Ken Tucker of The Philadelphia Inquirer thought that it contained "empty, cliche-ridden country-pop music from a group whose members apparently think that turning up the volume on their guitars qualifies as a bold new direction."

Taylor quit the band in 1987 to begin a solo career, as he was frustrated with the label almost exclusively choosing songs sung by Pennington as singles instead of ones sung by him. He was replaced by multi-instrumentalist Paul Martin, whose family owned a studio in Kentucky where Pennington had recorded on a number of occasions. Shortly after Martin's joining, Pennington quit as well, due to exhaustion and the departure of Taylor. He also experienced personality conflicts with Martin and Carroll. In particular, Carroll thought Pennington was too controlling of the band's sound and would not let him write songs. Pennington exited the band after a show on New Year's Eve 1988, and Martin was promoted to lead singer at the beginning of 1989.

Epic Records dropped the band in 1989 due to the failure of Shelter from the Night along with the departures of Taylor and Pennington. After Martin was in place as lead singer, the band members sought a replacement for Taylor as well. They found guitarist and vocalist Mark Jones, who joined in 1989. Jones had been aware of the band when he tried to hire them for his senior prom in 1978, but they were unable to attend due to scheduling conflicts. Roger BonDurant briefly joined their touring band by early 1989 as a backing vocalist and rhythm guitarist, but was not considered an official member. LeMaire told Jack Hurst of the Chicago Tribune that the addition of Martin to the lineup "opened up what we are capable of doing onstage" due to his ability to play other instruments such as mandolin and Dobro. In the same article, Hurst thought that Martin's singing voice was very similar to Pennington's.

=== 1989–1991: Move to Arista Nashville ===
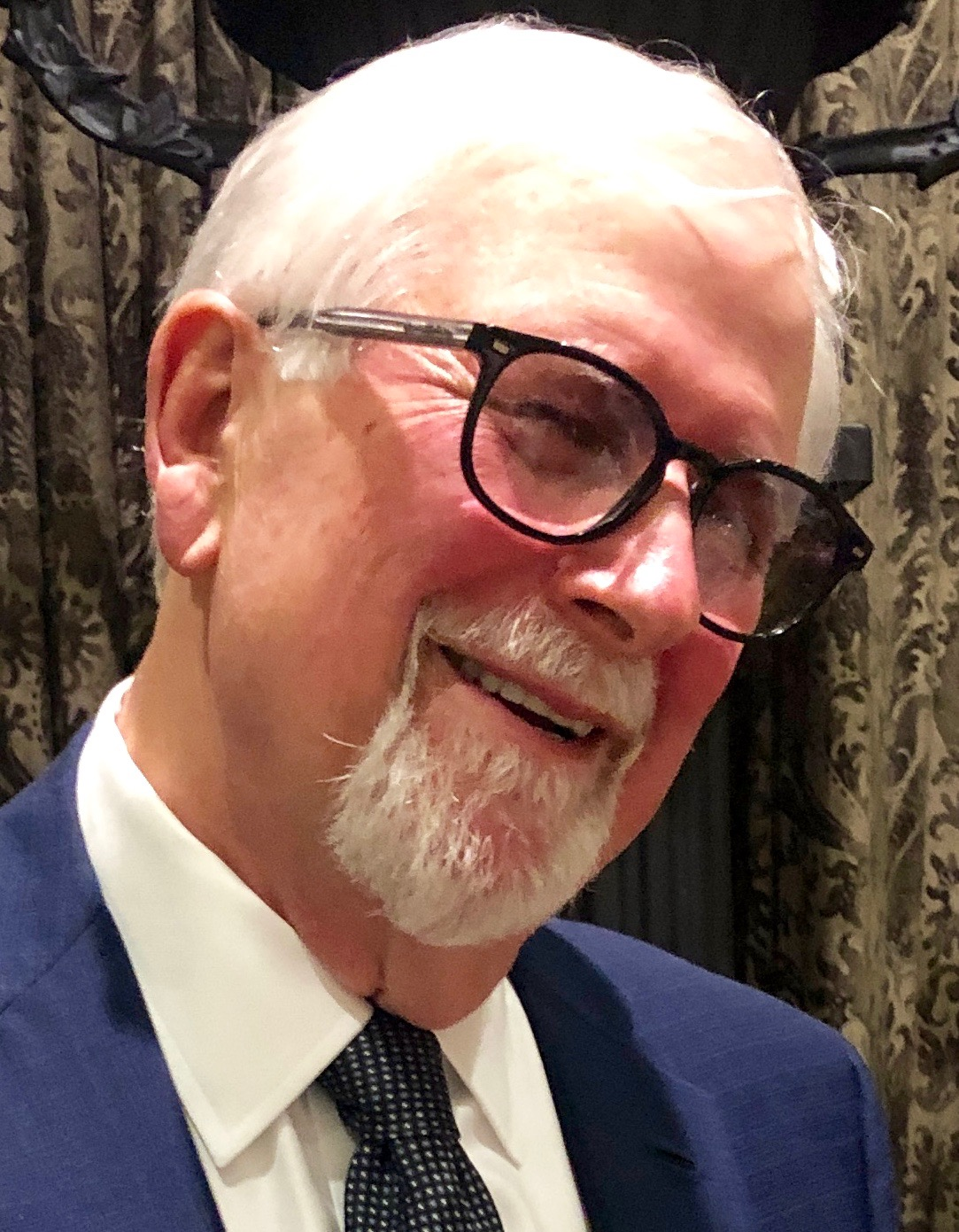
Tim DuBois signed Exile to Arista Nashville in 1989 and co-produced both of their albums for that label.

After Jones joined and Martin was promoted to lead singer, the band looked for a new recording contract. Radio host Lon Helton saw them perform in Hot Springs, Arkansas, and recommended the band to Tim DuBois, a record executive who had just started the Arista Nashville label and needed new artists. LeMaire was apprehensive, as he thought the new lineup should not retain the name Exile due to Pennington's absence, but DuBois thought the name recognition would help draw publicity to the new label, and signed the band at the end of 1989. Exile released their first Arista Nashville album, Still Standing, in 1990. DuBois co-produced it with Randy Sharp, a songwriter who had success with Restless Heart and also wrote several songs on the album. Still Standing was led off by the single "Keep It in the Middle of the Road", co-written by Pennington and LeMaire and featuring Martin on lead vocals. The song was a top-20 country hit in early 1990. An uncredited review of the single in Billboard stated of the song, "Hot guitar and piano licks strike like lightning throughout this lively, tightly performed number." After it were "Nobody's Talking" and "Yet", the band's final top-ten country hits. Both were co-written and sung by LeMaire, accounting for his first contributions as lead vocalist since All There Is. "Keep It in the Middle of the Road" and "Nobody's Talking" were promoted through music videos as well. Despite the success of "Nobody's Talking" and "Yet", the fourth single "There You Go" stopped at number 32 on the country music charts.

Their second and final album for Arista Nashville was 1991's Justice, which also featured DuBois as co-producer. Lead single "Even Now" (composed by Sharp and Marc Beeson) became the band's 21st and final entry on the Billboard country charts, with a peak of number 16. The follow-up was "Nothing at All", which did not chart. According to Martin, the song was withdrawn as a single due to concerns from label executives that it sounded too similar to Reba McEntire's "For My Broken Heart". Both of these songs featured Martin on lead vocals. Another track on the album was "The Invisible Man", composed by Mac McAnally. Jim Patterson of the Associated Press considered this one of the album's strongest tracks lyrically, while also opining that the album had "expertly crafted" musicianship. In response to the withdrawal of "Nothing at All", DuBois suggested "Somebody's Telling Her Lies" as a replacement. Martin later recalled that, while he and Jones liked "Somebody's Telling Her Lies", the other members questioned its potential as a single. As a result, it was not released and Exile asked to end their contract with Arista Nashville instead. Additionally, Caroll was unable to attend 25 concerts in this timespan due to his son needing a liver transplant; as a result, Martin began alternating between keyboards and guitar in concert.

== Early–mid 1990s: Solo careers, 30-year anniversary, and hiatus ==
Both Taylor and Pennington began their solo careers during Exile's tenure on Arista Nashville. Taylor released two albums for Epic as a solo artist: That Old Desire in 1990 and Blue Kentucky Wind a year later. These albums charted a combined four singles between November 1989 and late 1991, including a duet with Shelby Lynne titled "The Very First Lasting Love", although none of these reached the top 40 of the Billboard country charts. Also included on the second album was a song written with early Exile member Bernie Faulkner titled "The Porchlight". Pennington's only solo album, Whatever It Takes, was also released in 1991 on MCA Nashville. Produced by Barry Beckett, the album accounted for charting singles in its title track and "You Gotta Get Serious". Pennington performed two shows in Lexington, Kentucky, to promote the album, both of which included BonDurant as guitarist. Meanwhile, LeMaire and Beeson co-wrote Restless Heart's 1992 hit "When She Cries".

Regarding the band's departure from Arista Nashville, LeMaire thought that DuBois and other executives of the label had begun to focus more heavily on Diamond Rio after that band reached number one in 1991 with their debut single "Meet in the Middle". After exiting Arista Nashville, the members of Exile focused on touring while in search of another recording contract. They played an average of 150 shows a year between 1991 and 1993. They held a 30-year anniversary concert in 1993, which also included Cornelison, Pennington, Luxon, and Davenport. The band's tour bus was robbed after another concert that same year, which they took as a sign to retire from touring. Jones, Martin, and LeMaire did one show in 1994 at Dollywood, while they, Carroll, and Goetzman recorded Latest and Greatest for Intersound Records that same year. The album included a mix of original content and re-recordings of previous hit singles. One such re-recording was of "Super Love", which included several keyboard and synthesizer parts played by Martin. He also received his only writing credit for the band on the new song "L-O-V-E Spells Trouble".

After this album, Exile disbanded in 1995. Both Jones and Goetzman became artist managers, the former working with Pat Green and the latter with Steve Wariner and Bering Strait. In 1996, LeMaire and Beeson joined former Southern Pacific member Kurt Howell in the group Burnin' Daylight, which released one album on Curb Records. Martin chose to pursue a solo career, but after proving unsuccessful in this regard, he worked as a backing musician for Kathy Mattea. He also filled in as baritone vocalist in the Oak Ridge Boys in late 1995 following the departure of Steve Sanders. From there, Martin later joined Marty Stuart's backing band, the Fabulous Superlatives, before founding a family band with his wife and their children. This act was originally called the Martin Family Circus, but was renamed Rockland Road by 2020. According to Martin, this name change was due to the band often being mistaken for a circus act. Carroll moved to Pennsylvania at the beginning of the 21st century to franchise Papa John's pizza restaurants with his brother, and later returned to music in 2008 as keyboardist for a local blues band called Tin Can Buddha.

== Late 1990s–present: Reunion ==
Following the failures of their solo careers, Pennington and Taylor sought to reform Exile. They played a few local shows with various musicians on keyboards, drums, and bass before establishing a lineup with Steve Richmond on drums, Ray Salyer on bass, and Jason Witt on keyboards. This lineup played a concert at Billy Bob's Texas in Fort Worth, Texas, in 2005, and that concert was issued as part of the venue's Live at Billy Bob's Texas series of live albums. Meanwhile, LeMaire had further success as a songwriter in the first decade of the 21st century, including Diamond Rio's "Beautiful Mess", Andy Griggs's "She Thinks She Needs Me", and Clay Walker's "Fall" (also covered by Kimberley Locke). He collaborated with Shane Minor and Clay Mills on all three.

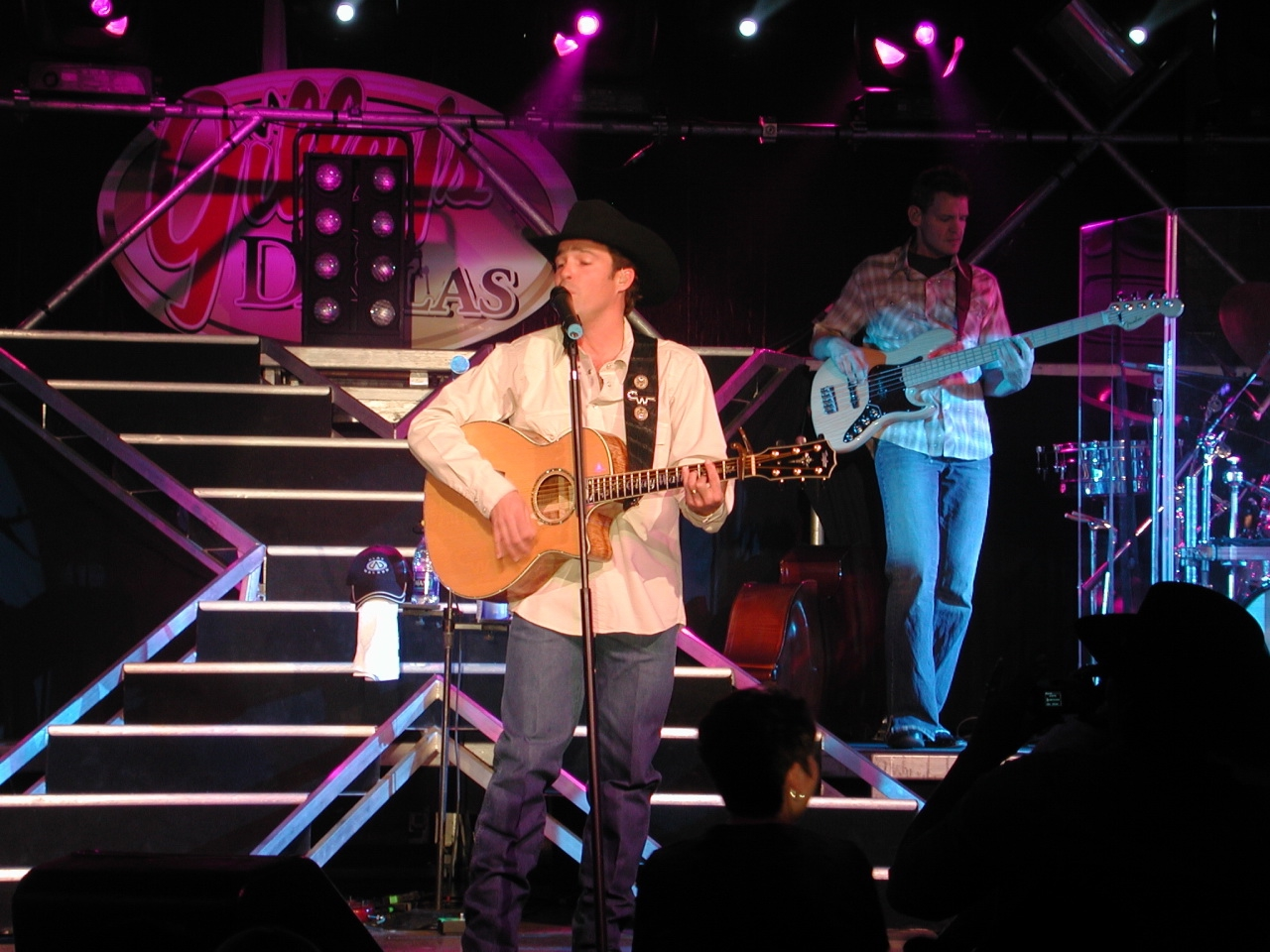
Exile member Sonny LeMaire co-wrote "Fall", a hit single for Clay Walker (pictured in 2008).

In 2008, Pennington and Taylor rejoined Hargis, LeMaire, and Goetzman for a charity concert in Lexington to benefit one of their former managers, who had been seriously injured in a motorcycle accident. In doing so, they re-established the lineup of the band's early Epic releases. After this concert, the five members decided to begin performing officially as Exile once more. Following their reunion, the Kentucky General Assembly honored the band in 2009 for "extraordinary talent", which led to them performing for members of the state of Kentucky legislature. This lineup self-released an extended play titled People Get Ready in 2012. The project featured a rendition of Curtis Mayfield's "People Get Ready", as well as a re-recording of "Kiss You All Over" with a guest vocal from Trace Adkins. The same year, the Kentucky Music Hall of Fame inducted Exile along with Skeeter Davis and the Kentucky Headhunters.

The band continued to record independently throughout the 2010s and 2020s. First was a Christmas album titled Wrapped Up in Your Arms for Christmas in 2017. In 2018, they released a new album titled Hits, consisting of re-recordings of their hit singles. This was followed a year later by The Garage Tapes, which included various demos from their early years. A second Christmas album, Joyful Noise, followed in 2021. Exile released A Million Miles Later via Clearwater Records in 2023. Pennington and LeMaire wrote most of the album except for a cover of Tennessee Ernie Ford's "Sixteen Tons". One track, "Down in Cold Water", features guest vocals from the Isaacs. "Rough Around the Edges" was released as a single from the album. Also in 2023, former member Billy Luxon released a memoir of the band's early years, titled Exiled: The Climax and Surrender of Jimmy Stokley.

On December 1, 2024, former member Bernie Faulkner died at age 77. Exile announced another new single, "Look Out, Heart", in May 2026, to be included on an album of the same name released later in the year. This was followed by another single titled "Rain Keeps Fallin'", alongside a series of tours between July and October 2026.

== Musical styles ==
Exile is known for their successful transition from pop and rock music to country music. Writing for AllMusic, Steve Huey stated that "Among rock listeners, Exile is remembered as the one-hit wonder responsible for 1978's number one smash 'Kiss You All Over.' However, in the early '80s, the Kentucky-bred band reinvented itself as a country outfit—and a hugely successful one at that." Westbrook wrote of hard rock influences in the band's Warner albums, particularly in the gruffness of original lead singer Jimmy Stokley's voice as well as the guitars, drums, and synthesizers present on tracks from All There Is. Huey stated that Taylor "spearheaded" the band's transition to country music, while Westbrook said that the success of "The Closer You Get" and "Take Me Down" in their subsequent covers by Alabama was also integral to the shift of Exile's sound. Westbrook also thought that Taylor and Pennington both had Southern accents conducive to singing country. Hargis told Cashbox in 1984, "It originally started as a rhythm and blues group. When I joined it had developed into a rock 'n' roll band. I suppose because it was the thing to do at the time, even though we all grew up with country music; it wasn't the thing to do, to be in a country band."

Most of the band's sound is defined by the songwriting, composition, and singing of Pennington and LeMaire. Westbrook also wrote of Pennington's sense of melody, such as the use of Lydian mode on the title track of All There Is, as well as the Southern gospel chord progressions of "Woke Up in Love" and the Hang On to Your Heart album track "Promises, Promises". Additionally, Westbrook thought the band included Western swing and boogie-woogie on tracks such as "I've Never Seen Anything", "Proud to Be Her Man", and "Keep It in the Middle of the Road". Also present on the albums with Epic were three-part vocal harmonies among Pennington, Taylor, and LeMaire. Pennington usually handled lead vocal duties on the Epic albums, including almost all the singles, although Taylor sang "It'll Be Me" and "She's Too Good to Be True". Of these songs, Westbrook wrote that their success "started a new streak" and "proved that Les' voice could prove as popular on country radio as J.P.'s." Most of the early Epic albums were dominated by collaborative songwriting between Pennington and LeMaire. Of their songwriting relationship, they both said they usually wrote together at the piano, and would start coming up with lyrics after one of them provided a title. Tom Carter of the Lexington Herald-Leader thought that the band's vocal harmonies and "often contrasting rhythms playing against the tone of the song" were notable elements of the band's overall sound. Hargis said that Exile was one of the first country bands to play all the instruments on their own albums instead of using session musicians, an observation also made by Pennington. Similarly, Walter Tunis thought in a review of Hang On to Your Heart that the album's lack of studio musicians such as a string section, as well as Pennington and LeMaire's dominance as songwriters on the album, would help the band stand out among their contemporaries. Ellen Creager of the Detroit Free Press wrote in a review of Kentucky Hearts that both Pennington and Taylor "have husky voices any girl could fall in love with." She also said that the album, unlike most other country albums at the time, largely consisted of up-tempo material.

== List of members ==
List of current and former members of Exile, in alphabetical order

Current

- J.P. Pennington – guitar, vocals (1964–1965, 1967–1988, 2005–present)
- Marlon Hargis – keyboards (1973–1987, 2008–present)
- Steve Goetzman – drums (1977–1995, 2008–present)
- Sonny LeMaire – bass guitar, vocals (1978–1995, 2008–present)
- Les Taylor – guitar, vocals (1979–1987, 2005–present)

Former

- Jimmy Stokley – lead vocals (1963–1979)
- Billy Luxon – trumpet, backing vocals, percussion (1963–1975)
- Mack Davenport – drums (1963–1971)
- Mike Howard – guitar (1963–1969)
- Paul Smith Jr. – rhythm guitar, bass guitar (1963–1967)
- Ronnie Hall – vocals (1963–1964)
- Doug Jones – guitar (1963)
- Buzz Cornelison – keyboards, backing vocals, saxophone, trumpet (1964–1967, 1969–1981)
- Bernie Faulkner – keyboards, backing vocals, guitar, saxophone (1967–1973)
- Larry Davis – bass guitar (1967)
- Bobby Johns – drums (1971–1977)
- Kenny Weir – guitar, bass guitar (1972–1974)
- Bill Kennon – bass guitar (1972)
- Danny Williams – bass guitar (1974–1977)
- Mark Gray – lead vocals, keyboards (1979–1982)
- Randy Rickman – lead vocals (1979)
- Lee Carroll – keyboards (1987–1995)
- Paul Martin – lead vocals, guitar (1989–1995)
- Mark Jones – harmony vocals, guitar (1988–1993)
- Roger BonDurant – guitar, backing vocals (touring) (1989)
- Steve Richmond – drums (2005–2010)
- Ray Salyer – bass guitar (2005)
- Jason Witt – keyboards (2005)

== Discography ==
=== Studio albums ===
List of studio albums released by Exile

- Exile (1973)
- Stage Pass (1973)
- Mixed Emotions (1978)
- All There Is (1979)
- Don't Leave Me This Way (1980)
- Heart & Soul (1981)
- Exile (1983)
- Kentucky Hearts (1984)
- Hang On to Your Heart (1985)
- Shelter from the Night (1987)
- Still Standing (1990)
- Justice (1991)
- Wrapped Up In Your Arms for Christmas (2017)
- The Garage Tapes (2019)
- Joyful Noise (2021)
- A Million Miles Later (2023)
