= Les Taylor (singer) =

American singer-songwriter

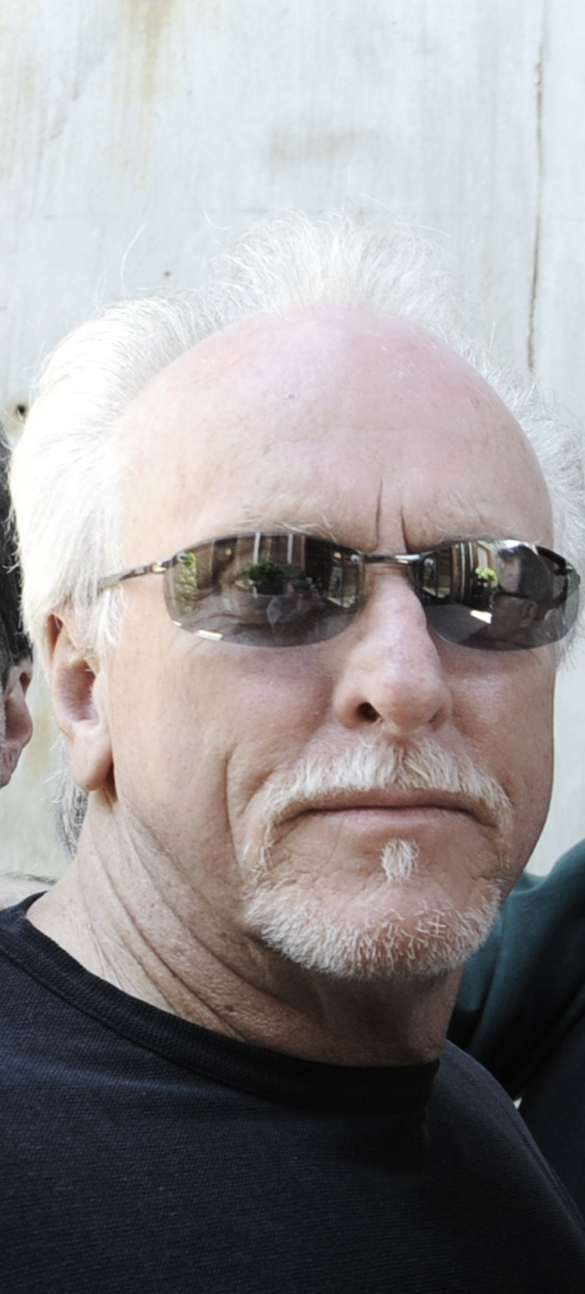
- Taylor in 2013

Background information
- Born: Leslie Christopher Taylor; December 27, 1948 (age 77); Oneida, Kentucky, U.S.
- Origin: Oneida, Kentucky, U.S.
- Genre: Country
- Occupation: Singer-songwriter
- Instruments: Vocals, guitar
- Years active: 1980–present
- Label: Epic
- Member of: Exile

Leslie Christopher Taylor (born December 27, 1948) is an American country music artist. Taylor has released two studio albums on Epic Records. His highest-charting single, "I Gotta Mind to Go Crazy", peaked at No. 44 in 1991.

In 1979, Taylor became the contributing lead vocalist and rhythm guitarist of country-pop band Exile. He performed with the group until 1989, when he left to pursue a solo career. After parting ways with Epic, Taylor reunited with Exile in 1995 and continues to perform with the band.

As a songwriter, Taylor has had his songs recorded by Travis Tritt and Shelby Lynne. He also co-wrote Janie Fricke's Number One single, "It Ain't Easy Bein' Easy".

== Discography ==
=== Albums ===
Title	Album details
That Old Desire	Release date: April 4, 1990; Label: Epic Records
Blue Kentucky Wind	Release date: April 23, 1991; Label: Epic Records

=== Singles ===
Year	Single	Peak positions	Album
Year	Single	US Country	Album
1989	"Shoulda, Coulda, Woulda Loved You"	46	That Old Desire
1990	"Knowin' You Were Leavin'"	58	That Old Desire
1991	"I Gotta Mind to Go Crazy"	44	Blue Kentucky Wind

=== Guest singles ===
Year	Single	Artist	Peak chart positions		Album
Year	Single	Artist	US Country	CAN Country	Album
1990	"Tomorrow's World"	Various artists	74	—	Single only
1991	"The Very First Lasting Love"	Shelby Lynne	50	41	Soft Talk / Blue Kentucky Wind
"—" denotes releases that did not chart

=== Music videos ===
Year	Video	Director
1989	"Shoulda, Coulda, Woulda Loved You"	Deaton Flanigen
1990	"Tomorrow's World" (Various)	Gustavo Garzon
1991	"The Very First Lasting Love" (with Shelby Lynne)	Deaton Flanigen
