= Kiss You All Over =

1978 single by Exile

Single by Exile

from the album Mixed Emotions
- B-side: "Don't Do It"
- Released: 1978
- Genre: Soft rock; pop rock; disco
- Length: 4:57 (album version); 3:27 (single edit)
- Label: Warner Bros.; Curb
- Songwriters: Mike Chapman; Nicky Chinn
- Producer: Mike Chapman

Exile singles chronology
"Try It On" (1976)	"Kiss You All Over" (1978)	"Never Gonna Stop" (1978)

Audio video
- "Kiss You All Over" on YouTube

"Kiss You All Over" is a 1978 song performed by American music group Exile, written by Mike Chapman and Nicky Chinn. It was included on the band's third album, Mixed Emotions (1978), and featured frontman Jimmy Stokley, guitarist J.P. Pennington, and bassist Danny Williams on vocals. On the American Top 40 broadcast of May 26, 1979, Casey Kasem reported that Chapman stated his source of inspiration for "Kiss You All Over" was "It's Ecstasy When You Lay Down Next to Me" by Barry White. The song was a number-one single in the United States, but proved to be Exile's only big hit in the pop market; they later achieved success on the country music charts.

"Kiss You All Over" is the first Exile song to feature founding member J.P. Pennington on lead vocals.

It held the number-one spot on the Billboard Hot 100 for four weeks (starting September 30), and Billboard ranked it as the No. 5 song for 1978. The track also reached number one in at least three other countries. In the United Kingdom, the song was released on Mickie Most's RAK Records, and peaked at number 6 on the UK Singles Chart. The strings are played with a synthesizer on a backing track. In 2010, Billboard ranked the song tenth on its list of "The 50 Sexiest Songs of All Time".

Stokley, co-lead vocalist on the track, parted ways with the band in 1979 due to tensions with Chapman. After the success of "Kiss You All Over", subsequent soft rock singles from the albums Mixed Emotions and All There Is charted lower in comparison.

The band moved into country music in the 1980s, after their self-written pop singles became hits for other acts such as Alabama and Huey Lewis and the News despite failing for Exile. The genre shift was successful, as they achieved over ten No. 1 hits on the U.S. country charts.

== Personnel ==
Exile

- J.P. Pennington – vocals, guitars
- Jimmy Stokley – vocals
- Danny Williams – bass, vocals
- Buzz Cornelison – piano, backing vocals
- Marlon Hargis – synthesizers, backing vocals
- Steve Goetzman – drums

== Charts ==
=== Weekly charts ===
Chart (1978)	Peak position
Australia (Kent Music Report)	1
Austria (Ö3 Austria Top 40)	9
Belgium (Ultratop 50 Flanders)	7
Canada Top Singles (RPM)	2
Canada Adult Contemporary (RPM)	2
Ireland (IRMA)	7
Netherlands (Dutch Top 40)	4
Netherlands (Single Top 100)	7
New Zealand (Recorded Music NZ)	1
Norway (VG-lista)	5
South Africa (Springbok Radio)	1
Sweden (Sverigetopplistan)	2
Switzerland (Schweizer Hitparade)	3
UK Singles (Official Charts)	6
US Billboard Hot 100	1
US Adult Contemporary (Billboard)	19
West Germany (GfK)	3

=== Year-end charts ===
Chart (1978)	Position
Australia (Kent Music Report)	37
Belgium (Ultratop 50 Flanders)	59
Canada Top Singles (RPM)	58
Netherlands (Dutch Top 40)	32
Netherlands (Single Top 100)	71
New Zealand (RIANZ)	7
South Africa (Springbok Radio)	3
US Billboard Hot 100	5

Chart (1979)	Position
Australia (Kent Music Report)	39
West Germany (Media Control)	37

=== All-time charts ===
Chart (1958–2018)	Position
US Billboard Hot 100	163

== Certifications ==
Region	Certification	Certified units/sales
United Kingdom (BPI)	Silver	250,000^{^}
United States (RIAA)	Platinum	1,000,000^{‡}
^{^} Shipments figures based on certification alone.^{‡} Sales+streaming figures based on certification alone.

== Broadway version ==
"Kiss You All Over"

Song by Broadway

from the album Magic Man
- B-side: "Love Bandit"
- Length: 3:48
- Label: Hilltak HT 7802
- Songwriters: Mike Chapman, Nicky Chinn
- Producer: Willie Henderson

Disco band Broadway recorded their version. The single backed with "Love Bandit" was released on Hilltak 7802, and distributed by Atlantic Records. It was also issued in a 12" format. Music magazine called it "The inevitable disco version".

It had a three-week run with the song on the Billboard Hot Soul Singles chart, peaking at No. 92 on December 16, 1978.

=== Charts ===
Chart (1978)	Peak position
US Hot Soul Singles (Billboard)	92

== No Mercy version ==
"Kiss You All Over"

Single by No Mercy
- Released: 1997
- Length: 4:36
- Label: MCI; BMG; Arista
- Songwriters: Mike Chapman; Nicky Chinn
- Producers: Johnny Vicious; Darrin "Spike" Friedman

No Mercy singles chronology
"Please Don't Go" (1997)	"Kiss You All Over" (1997)	"Hello How Are You" (1998)

Music video
- "Kiss You All Over" on YouTube

German Eurodance trio No Mercy's 1997 remixed version by Johnny Vicious and Darrin "Spike" Friedman reached number-one on the US Billboard Dance Club Play chart. It also reached number 16 on the UK Singles Chart and number 47 in Australia. The accompanying music video was directed by DoRo Productions.

=== Critical reception ===
Larry Flick from Billboard magazine wrote, "There's no denying that No Mercy's eponymous album is several notches above standard dance/pop fare—as evidenced by this Latin-spiced rendition of Exile's '70s-era hit." He noted that "the song's hook thrives within FMP's arrangement of swirling house beats and flamenco guitars." He also added "factor in the act's sweet harmonies". Another Billboard editor, Paul Verna, named it an "giddy rendition". Diana Valois from The Morning Call named "Kiss You All Over" the "second best cut" of the album, describing it as "a full-blown flamenco exotica cover". Pan-European magazine Music & Media constated that "this highly successful trio has given this song a poppy-flamenco treatment that is likely to mean it will chart all over the place once again, something that proves that good songs last a long while." A reviewer from Music Week gave the song a score of four out of five, concluding, "A third huge hit for the boys."

=== Track listing ===
- CD single
1. "Kiss You All Over" (radio edit) – 4:31
2. "Kiss You All Over" (club mix) – 5:53
3. "Bonita" (radio edit) – 3:54
4. "Bonita" (club mix) – 7:08

=== Charts ===
Chart (1997)	Peak position
Australia (ARIA)	47
Austria (Ö3 Austria Top 40)	13
Belgium (Ultratop 50 Flanders)	43
Estonia (Eesti Top 20)	8
Estonia Airplay (Eesti Top 25)	5
Europe (Eurochart Hot 100)	20
Germany (GfK)	40
Hungary (Mahasz)	5
Israel (Israeli Singles Chart)	11
Netherlands (Dutch Top 40)	18
Netherlands (Single Top 100)	30
New Zealand (Recorded Music NZ)	44
Scottish Singles Sales (Official Charts)	10
Switzerland (Schweizer Hitparade)	33
UK Singles (Official Charts)	16
US Billboard Hot 100	80
US Dance Club Play (Billboard)	1

=== Release history ===
Region	Date	Format(s)	Label(s)	Ref.
Germany	1997	CD	MCI; BMG	
United Kingdom	August 25, 1997	CD	MCI; BMG; Arista	
United States	October 7, 1997	Rhythmic contemporary; contemporary hit radio	Arista	

== Samplings ==
In 2003, production duo Live Element created a French house song called "Something About You", which samples the lyrics of the second verse of "Kiss You All Over". In the United States, Gossip Records shipped promotion 12-inch vinyls to clubs on November 25, 2003. Two years later, on May 2, 2005, the song was issued as a commercial CD single in Australia through Zip Music, backed with several remixes. The single peaked at number 19 on Australia's ARIA Singles Chart and number three on the ARIA Dance chart, while the remixes by Sgt Slick and Cabin Crew reached number eight on the ARIA Club Tracks chart. It was also a hit in Finland, where it peaked at number 13 in late 2005.
