= Buddy Killen =

American songwriter and record producer (1932-2006)

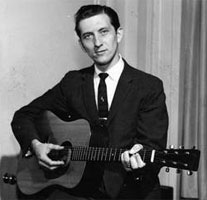
Buddy Killen pitching one of his first songs for Tree Publishing Co.

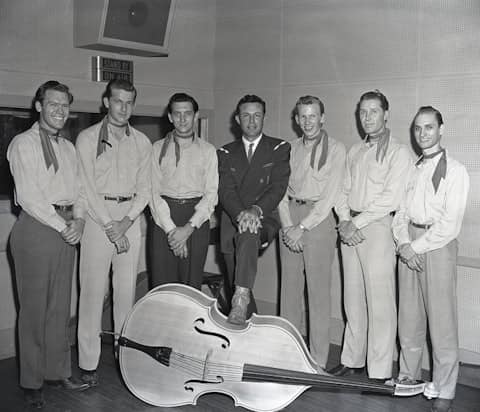
Jim Reeves and his band The Blue Boys. Buddy Killen being the bass player at the time.

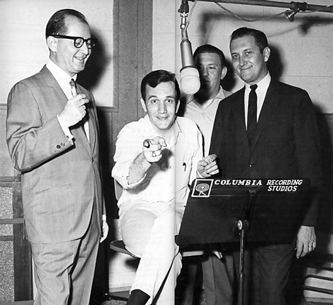
Jack Stapp, Roger Miller, and Buddy Killen. Columbia Records.

William Doyce "Buddy" Killen (November 13, 1932 – November 1, 2006) was an American record producer and music publisher, and a former owner of Trinity Broadcasting Network and Tree International Publishing, the largest country music publishing business, before he sold it to CBS Records in 1989. He was also the owner of Killen Music Group, involved with more diverse genres of music, such as pop and rap.

== Biography ==
William Doyce Killen was born in Florence, Alabama. Immediately upon graduating high school in 1951, he moved to Nashville, Tennessee. In Nashville, Killen worked as an upright bass player in the Grand Ole Opry.

In 1951, Jack Stapp, then program director of WSM radio and manager of the Grand Ole Opry, founded Tree Publishing. Stapp first hired Killen to sing demos for the company for $10 a night, a job Killen accepted while hoping it might lead to a singing spot on the Opry. Stapp promoted him to a song plugger position for company in 1953, and in 1955 Killen and Tree scored international success with Elvis Presley's first number 1 hit, "Heartbreak Hotel". Killen was promoted to executive vice president of Tree Publishing, where he worked with Roger Miller, Dottie West, and Dolly Parton.

Killen also achieved success as a songwriter with songs including the Little Dippers' hit "Forever" (1960), Buck Owens' "Open Up Your Heart" (1966), and "I May Never Get to Heaven", which was a hit for Conway Twitty in 1979. In 1964 Killen formed the Dial Records label in order to promote Joe Tex, with a string of successful songs beginning with "Hold What You've Got" (1964).

In 1971 Killen and three business partners bought Danny Davis' Nashville Audio Recorders studio, with Killen becoming the sole owner of the studio, renamed Sound Shop Recording Studios, in 1975. Killen's work as a record producer included artists such as Louise Mandrell, Exile, Ronnie McDowell, Diana Trask, and T. G. Sheppard.

Killen became president of Tree International Publishing in 1975. Following the death of Jack Stapp in 1980, Killen became the sole owner of the company. Under Killen's leadership, Tree became a leading publisher on the Billboard charts. In 1985, Killen was inducted into the Alabama Music Hall of Fame.

In 1989, Killen sold the company to Sony Music Entertainment subsidiary CBS Records for a price estimated to be between $30 million and $40 million. At the time, Tree International Publishing had a catalogue of approximately 35,000 songs.

After the sale of Tree Publishing, Killen formed the Killen Music Group. During this time, Killen worked with artists such as Faith Hill, Trace Adkins, Kenny Chesney, Reba McEntire and Bill Anderson. In the mid-2000s, Killen's company worked with Outkast, publishing songs on the companion album to their 2006 film Idlewild. He also co-published the popular Rascal Flatts song "Me and My Gang".

=== Death ===
Killen died in Nashville, Tennessee on November 1, 2006, twelve days before his 74th birthday. The cause of death was pancreatic cancer.
