= J.P. Pennington =

American singer-songwriter

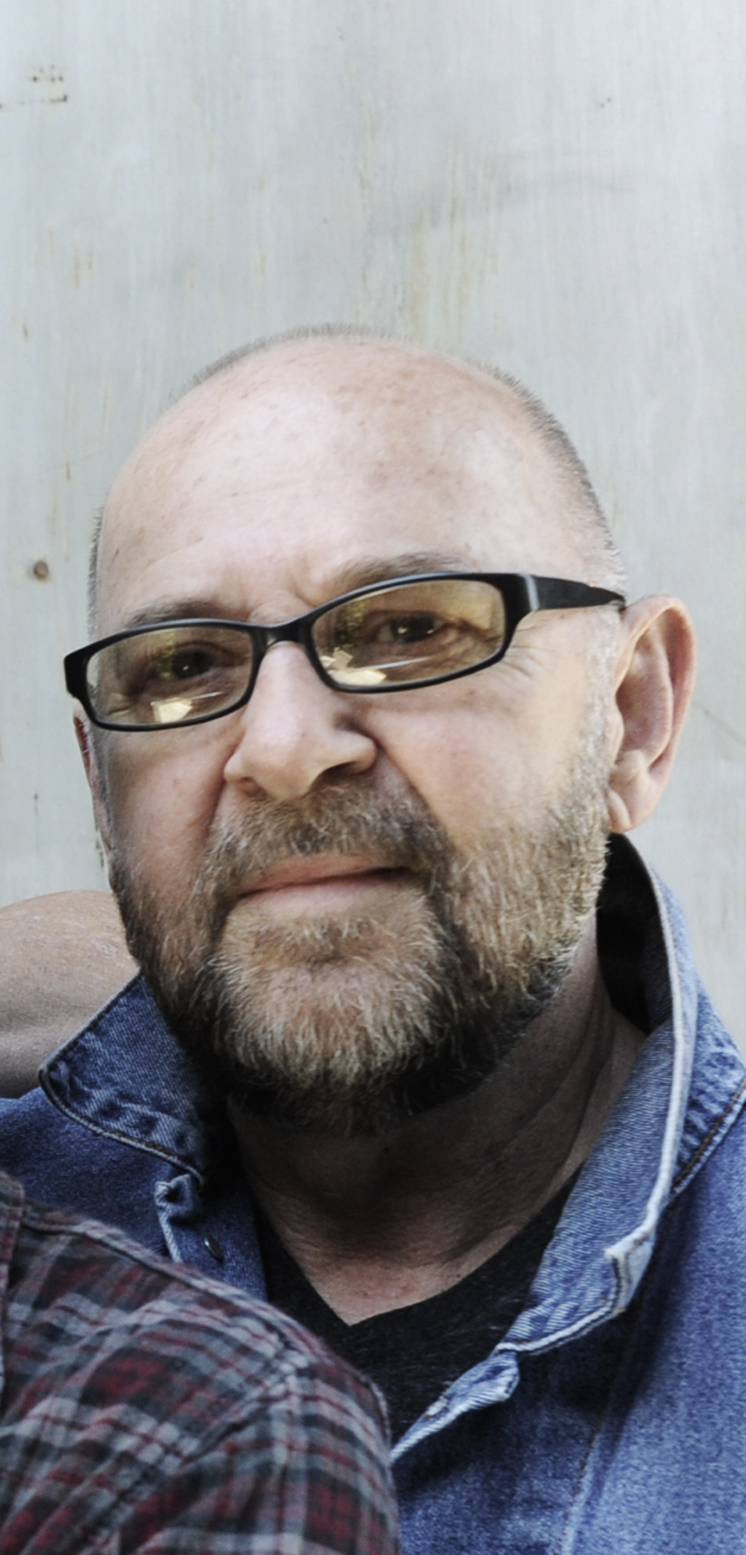
- Pennington in 2013.

Background information
- Born: James Preston Pennington; January 22, 1949 (age 77); Berea, Kentucky, U.S.
- Genres: pop, Country
- Occupation: Singer
- Instruments: Vocals, guitar, bass
- Years active: 1963–present
- Labels: Warner Curb, Epic, MCA
- Member of: Exile

James Preston Pennington (born January 22, 1949) is an American musician, known primarily as the guitarist and co-lead vocalist of the country pop band Exile. Pennington was one of the early members and one of the lead singers of the group until departing in 1989, before reuniting the mid-80s country lineup in 2008.

== Early life ==
Pennington was born in Berea, Kentucky. His mother, Lily May Ledford was a member of The Coon Creek Girls, the first all-female string band.

== Career ==
Pennington started playing guitar in bands as young as fourteen years old. His musical influences include Chet Atkins, Elvis Presley, Jerry Lee Lewis and Little Richard.

He was a member of Le Sabers in the early 1960s, whose lead singer Leroy Pullins later had a hit with the novelty song "I'm a Nut" in 1966. In 1964, he joined Exile, then called Jimmy Stokey and the Exiles, as a bass player. He had never played a bass prior to joining the band. Pennington left in 1965, as his parents thought that at sixteen he was too young to be in a band. Two years later, Pennington, now eighteen, rejoined the group.

Pennington was one of the first members of the band to write original songs, however this time went unnoticed at the time as fans preferred them covering already popular songs. He left Exile again in 1972 to move to California with his cousin, but only a few months later, he was back in the band in Kentucky, this time on lead guitar.

In 1978, Exile finally had their first hit single with "Kiss You All Over", which Pennington shared lead vocals with Stokey. The song became their only number one on the Billboard Hot 100. Stokey left in 1979, and Pennington became co-lead vocalist with other band members. By the 1980s, the band had changed to a country group, and had ten number ones on the US country charts, all of which were either written of co-written by Pennington.

After leaving Exile on New Year's Eve 1988, he signed to MCA Records as a solo artist. There, he released three singles and one album, Whatever It Takes, in 1991. Pennington re-established the band in 2005, together with guitarist Les Taylor.

== Personal life ==
Pennington and his wife Susie have a son, James Lafayette Pennington (born 1988), who is a baritone barbershop singer, and a daughter, Jesse Rose, who is a singer.

== Legacy ==
Pennington was voted alongside Exile band member Sonny LeMaire as BMI Songwriter of the Year in 1986, and in 2000 was one of one-hundred songwriters who were a part of the "Songwriters of the Century" list, also compiled by BMI.

== Discography ==
=== Albums ===
Title	Album details
Whatever It Takes	Release date: May 14, 1991; Label: MCA Records

=== Singles ===
Year	Single	Peak positions	Album
Year	Single	US Country	Album
1991	"Whatever It Takes"	45	Whatever It Takes
1991	"Old Familiar Ring"	—	Whatever It Takes
1991	"You Gotta Get Serious"	72	Whatever It Takes
"—" denotes releases that did not chart
