= Sonny LeMaire =

American singer and bassist (born 1947)

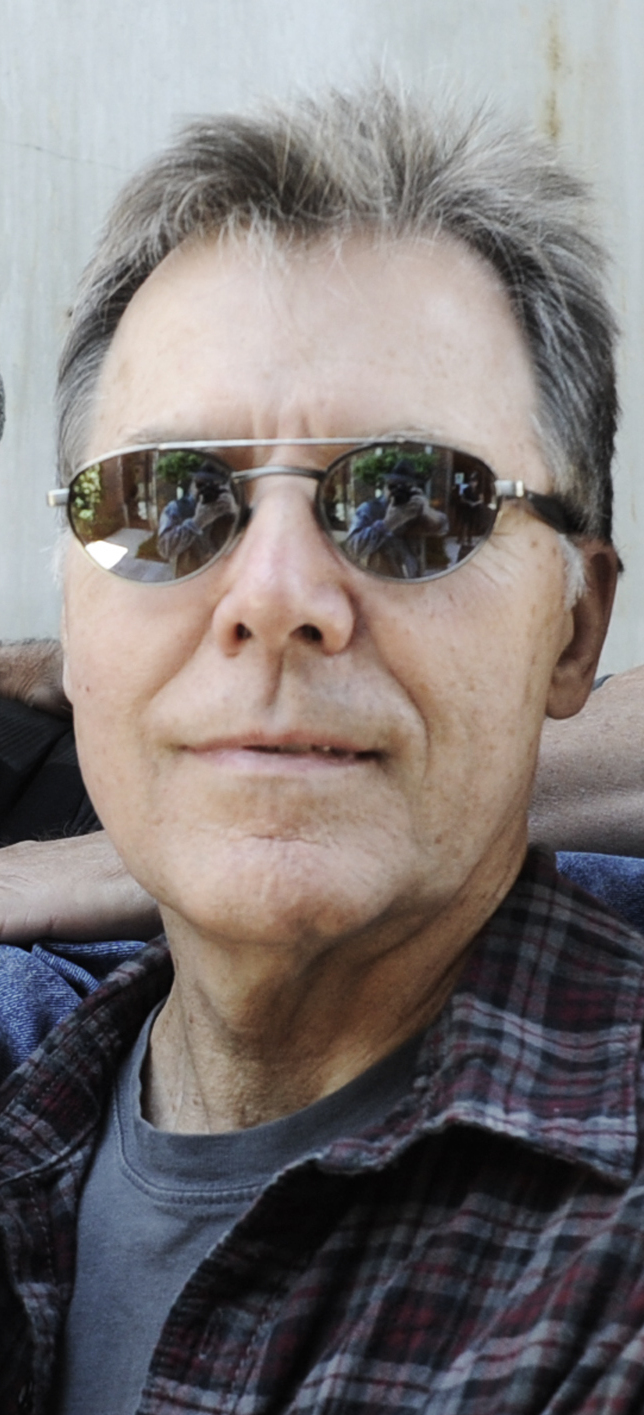
- LeMaire in 2013.

Background information
- Born: Alfred William LeMaire; September 16, 1947 (age 79); Fort Lee, Virginia, U.S.
- Genre: Country
- Occupations: Singer, songwriter
- Instruments: Vocals, bass guitar
- Years active: 1977-present
- Member of: Exile
- Formerly of: Burnin' Daylight

Alfred William "Sonny" LeMaire (born September 16, 1947) is an American country music artist. LeMaire is best known as being the bass guitarist of the band Exile, a role that he first held in 1977. After lead singer J. P. Pennington quit the band in 1989, LeMaire alternated with Paul Martin on lead vocals, including the singles "Nobody's Talking" and "Yet". Following Exile's initial 1993 disbanding, LeMaire played bass for Burnin' Daylight in the mid-nineties, reuniting permanently with his "Kiss You All Over" bandmates in 2008.

In addition to co-writing several of Exile's singles with Pennington, LeMaire wrote Restless Heart's 1992 hit "When She Cries", along with "What I Did Right" by Sons of the Desert, "Beautiful Mess" by Diamond Rio, "She Thinks She Needs Me" by Andy Griggs, and "Fall", recorded first by Clay Walker and then Kimberley Locke.

Sonny has been married to Mary Ellen LeMaire since November 11, 2019
