= Joe Tex discography =

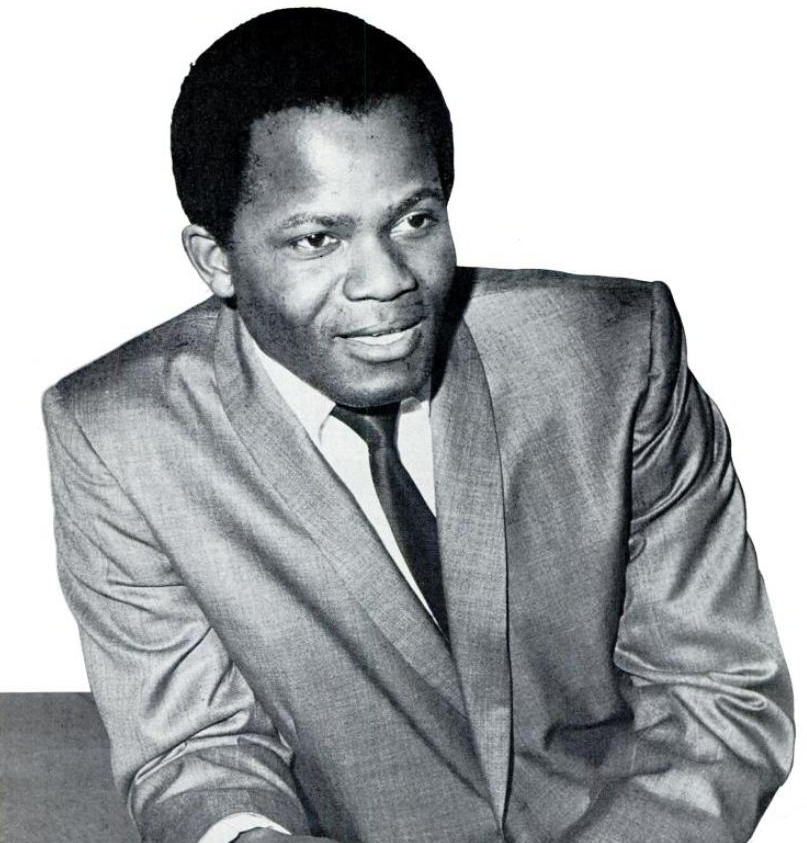
- Joe Tex in 1965
- Studio albums: 18
- Compilation albums: 47
- Singles: 81
- B-sides: 3

This article contains comprehensive discography information related to Joe Tex.

== Albums ==
- 1965 Hold What You've Got (Dial Records, distributed by Atlantic Records) - US Pop #124, US R&B #2
- 1965 Hold On! It's Joe Tex (Checker)
- 1965 The Best of Joe Tex (King)
- 1965 The Best of Joe Tex (Parrot)
- 1965 Joe Tex (Pickwick)
- 1965 The New Boss (Dial/Atlantic) - US #142, US R&B #3
- 1966 The Love You Save (Dial/Atlantic) - US #108
- 1966 I've Got to Do a Little Better (Dial/Atlantic)
- 1967 The Best of Joe Tex (Dial/Atlantic)
- 1968 Live and Lively (Dial/Atlantic) - US #84
- 1968 Soul Country (Dial/Atlantic) - US #154
- 1969 Happy Soul (Dial/Atlantic)
- 1969 Buying a Book (Dial/Atlantic) - US #190
- 1969 You Better Get It (Dial/Atlantic)
- 1970 With Strings and Things (Dial/Atlantic)
- 1972 From the Roots Came the Rapper (Dial/Atlantic)
- 1972 I Gotcha (Dial) - US #17
- 1972 The History of...Joe Tex (Pride)
- 1972 Spill the Beans (Dial)
- 1973 The Best of Joe Tex (Citation)
- 1977 Bumps & Bruises (Epic) - US #108
- 1977 Another Woman's Man (Power Pak)
- 1978 Rub Down (Epic)
- 1979 He Who Is Without Funk Cast the First Stone (Dial)
- 1979 Super Soul (Parrot/London)
- 1982 J.T.'s Funk (Accord)
- 1984 Ain't I a Mess (Chess)
- 1985 The Best of Joe Tex (Atlantic)
- 1988 I Believe I'm Gonna Make It: The Best of Joe Tex 1964-1972 (Rhino)
- 1988 The Best of Joe Tex (Charly)
- 1989 Different Strokes (Charly)
- 1989 Stone Soul Country (Charly)
- 1991 Greatest Hits (Curb)
- 1996 The Very Best of Joe Tex (Rhino)
- 1999 His Greatest Hits (Charly)
- 2000 25 All Time Greatest Hits (Varèse)
- 2000 Golden Legends (Direct Source)
- 2000 Greatest Hits!!! (7-N/Buddha)
- 2001 Show Me the Hits (Malaco)
- 2001 Oh Boy Classics Presents Joe Tex (Oh Boy)
- 2001 Hold On to What You've Got/The New Boss (Connoisseur Collection)
- 2001 The Love You Save/I've Got to Do a Little Bit Better (Connoisseur Collection)
- 2002 Buying a Book (includes bonus tracks)
- 2002 The Masters (Eagle Rock Entertainment)
- 2002 12 Hits: Five Star Collection (Varese)
- 2002 Ain't Gonna Bump No More (Southbound)
- 2002 David Allan Coe Presents Joe Tex (Coe Pop)
- 2002 The Complete Dial Recordings, Volume 3: Live and Lively/Soul Country (RPM)
- 2002 The Complete Dial Recordings, Volume 4: Happy Soul/Buying a Book (RPM)
- 2002 Testifyin': The Essential Joe Tex (Castle Select)
- 2003 Classic Masters (Capitol)
- 2004 This Is Gold (Disky)
- 2006 The Very Best of, Volume 1 (Sony)
- 2006 The Very Best of, Volume 2 (Sony)
- 2006 Yum Yum Yum (HHO Licensing)
- 2006 The Best of Joe Tex (Platinum Disc)
- 2006 Golden Soul Hits (CBujEnt.)
- 2006 Nothing But a Joe Tex Party (Legacy)
- 2007 The One That You Love (KRB Music)
- 2007 Greatest Hits (Collectables)
- 2007 Greatest Hits (Neon)
- 2008 The Best of Joe Tex (Gusto)
- 2008 The Love You Save (Roots and Rhythm)
- 2008 First on the Dial: Early Singles and Rare Gems (Shout)
- 2008 Get Way Back: The 1950s Recordings (Ace)

== Singles ==
Year	Titles (A-side, B-side) Both sides from same album except where indicated	Chart positions				Certifications	Album
Year	Titles (A-side, B-side) Both sides from same album except where indicated	US	US R&B	AUS	UK	Certifications	Album
1955	"Come in This House" b/w "Davy, You Upset My Home"	―	―	―	―		The Best of Joe Tex (King)
1956	"My Biggest Mistake" b/w "Right Back to My Arms"	―	―	―	―		The Best of Joe Tex (King)
1956	"She's Mine" b/w "I Had to Come Back to You"	―	―	―	―		The Best of Joe Tex (King)
1956	"Get Way Back" b/w "Pneumonia"	―	―	―	―		The Best of Joe Tex (King)
1957	"Ain't Nobody's Business" b/w "I Want to Have a Talk with You"	―	―	―	―		The Best of Joe Tex (King)
1958	"Cut It Out" b/w "Just for You and Me"	―	―	―	―		Non-album tracks
1958	"Open the Door" b/w "Teenage Rock"; By "Little Booker, featuring Joe Tex, vocals"	―	―	―	―		Non-album tracks
1958	"You Little Baby Face Thing" b/w "Mother's Advice"	―	―	―	―		Non-album tracks
1959	"Don't Hold It Against Me" b/w "Yum, Yum, Yum"	―	―	―	―		Non-album tracks
1959	"Charlie Brown Got Expelled" b/w "Blessed Are These Tears"; By "Joe Tex and His X Class Mates"	―	―	―	―		Non-album tracks
1960	"Boys Will Be Boys" b/w "Grannie Stole the Show"	―	―	―	―		Non-album tracks
1960	"I'll Never Break Your Heart (Part 1)" b/w "Part 2"; By "Joe Tex and The Vibrators"	―	―	―	―		Hold On!
1960	"All I Could Do Was Cry (Part 1)" b/w "Part 2"	102	―	―	―		Hold On!
1960	"Goodbye My Love" b/w "Wicked Woman"	—	―	―	―		Turn Back the Hands of Time
1961	"Baby You're Right" b/w "Ain't I a Mess"	—	―	―	―		Hold On!
1961	"The Only Girl (I've Ever Loved)" b/w "What Should I Do"	—	―	―	―		The Best of Joe Tex (Parrot)
1961	"One Giant Step" b/w "The Rib"	—	―	―	―		Non-album tracks
1962	"I Let Her Get Away" b/w "The Peck"	—	―	―	―		The Best of Joe Tex (Parrot)
1962	"Hand-Shakin', Love Makin', Girl Takin'; Son-of-a-Gun" b/w "Popeye Johnny" (Non-album track)	—	―	―	―		The Best of Joe Tex (Parrot)
1962	"Meet Me in Church" b/w "Be Your Own Judge" (Non-album track)	—	―	―	―		The Best of Joe Tex (Parrot)
1963	"Someone to Take Your Place" b/w "I Should Have Kissed Her More" (Non-album track)	—	―	―	―		The Best of Joe Tex (Parrot)
1963	"You Keep Her" b/w "Don't Play" (from Hold On!)	—	―	―	―		Non-album track
1963	"I Wanna Be Free" b/w "Blood's Thicker Than Water" (Non-album track)	—	―	―	―		The Best of Joe Tex (Parrot)
1964	"Say Thank You" b/w "Looking for My Pig" (Non-album track)	—	―	―	―		The Best of Joe Tex (Parrot)
1964	"I Had a Good Home But I Left (Part 1)" b/w "Part 2"	—	―	―	―		The Best of Joe Tex (Parrot)
1964	"The Next Time She's Mine" b/w "I've Got a Song"	—	―	―	―		Non-album tracks
1964	"Sit Yourself Down" b/w "Get Closer Together"	—	―	―	―		Hold On!
1964	"I'd Rather Have You" b/w "Old Time Lover" (from The Best of Joe Tex (Parrot))	—	44	―	―		Non-album tracks
1964	"Hold What You've Got" b/w "Fresh Out of Tears"	5	1	―	―		Hold What You've Got
1965	"Boys Will Be Boys" b/w "Baby You're Right (I'm Gonna Hold What I Got)"	—	—	―	―		Non-album tracks
1965	"You Got What It Takes" /	51	10	―	―		Hold What You've Got
1965	"You Better Get It"	46	15	―	―		Hold What You've Got
1965	"A Woman Can Change a Man" /	56	12	―	―		The New Boss
1965	"Don't Let Your Left Hand Know"	95	—	―	―		The Love You Save
1965	"One Monkey Don't Stop No Show" b/w "Build Your Love on a Solid Foundation" (from The Love You Save)	65	20	―	―		Hold What You've Got
1965	"I Want To (Do Everything For You)" b/w "Funny Bone" (from The Love You Save)	23	1	―	―		The New Boss
1966	"A Sweet Woman Like You" b/w "Close the Door"	29	1	―	―		The Love You Save
1966	"The Love You Save (May Be Your Own)" b/w "If Sugar Was as Sweet as You"	56	2	―	―		The Love You Save
1966	"S.Y.S.L.J.F.M. (The Letter Song)" b/w "I'm a Man" (from The Love You Save)	39	9	―	―		I've Got to Do a Little Bit Better
1966	"I Believe I'm Gonna Make It" b/w "You Better Believe It Baby" (from The Love You Save)	67	8	―	―		I've Got to Do a Little Bit Better
1966	"I've Got to Do a Little Bit Better" b/w "What in the World" (from The New Boss)	64	20	―	―		I've Got to Do a Little Bit Better
1966	"Papa Was Too" b/w "The Truest Woman in the World"	44	15	―	―		I've Got to Do a Little Bit Better
1967	"Show Me" b/w "A Woman Sees a Hard Time (When Her Man Is Gone)" (from I've Got to Do a Little Bit Better)	35	24	―	―		The Best of Joe Tex (Atlantic)
1967	"Woman Like That, Yeah" b/w "I'm Going and Get It"	54	24	―	―		Non-album tracks
1967	"A Woman's Hands" b/w "C.C. Rider" (from The New Boss)	63	24	―	―		Live and Lively
1967	"Skinny Legs and All" b/w "Watch the One (That Brings the Bad News)" (from I've Got to Do a Little Bit Better)	10	2	―	―		Live and Lively
1967	"I'll Make Every Day Christmas (For My Woman)" b/w "Don't Give Up" (from Live and Lively)	—	—	―	―		Non-album tracks
1968	"Men Are Gettin' Scarce" b/w "You're Gonna Thank Me Woman" (from Live and Lively)	33	7	―	―		Non-album tracks
1968	"I'll Never Do You Wrong" b/w "Wooden Spoon" (from Live and Lively)	59	26	―	―		Soul Country
1968	"Soul Meeting" b/w "That's How It Feels"; By "The Soul Clan" (Joe Tex, Solomon Burke, Arthur Conley, Don Covay and Ben E. King)	91	34	―	―		Non-album tracks
1968	"Betwixt and Between" b/w "Chocolate Cherry"; By "The Joe Tex Band"	—	—	―	―		Non-album tracks
1968	"Keep the One You Got" b/w "Go Home and Do It"	52	13	―	―		Happy Soul
1968	"You Need Me, Baby" b/w "Baby, Be Good"	81	29	―	―		Happy Soul
1968	"That's Your Baby" b/w "Sweet, Sweet Woman"	—	—	―	―		Happy Soul
1969	"Buying a Book" b/w "Chicken Crazy" (from Happy Soul)	47	10	―	―		Buying a Book
1969	"Say Thank You" b/w "Looking for My Pig" (Non-album track); Reissue	—	—	―	―		The Best of Joe Tex (Parrot)
1969	"That's the Way" b/w "Anything You Wanna Know"	94	46	―	―		Buying a Book
1969	"It Ain't Sanitary" b/w "We Can't Sit Down Now"	117	—	―	―		Buying a Book
1969	"(When Johnny Comes Marching Home Again) I Can't See You No More" b/w "Sure Is Good" (from Buying a Book)	105	―	―	―		Joe Tex Sings with Strings & Things
1970	"You're Right, Ray Charles" b/w "Everything Happens on Time"	—	—	―	―		Joe Tex Sings with Strings & Things
1970	"I'll Never Fall in Love Again" b/w "The Only Way I Know to Love You"	—	—	―	―		From the Roots Came the Rapper
1971	"Bad Feet" b/w "I Knew Him" (Non-album track)	—	—	―	―		I Gotcha
1971	"Papa's Dream" b/w "I'm Comin' Home" (Non-album track)	—	—	―	―		Joe Tex Spills the Beans
1971	"Give the Baby Anything the Baby Wants" b/w "Takin' a Chance"	102	20	―	―		I Gotcha
1972	"I Gotcha" /	2	1	―	―		I Gotcha
1972	"A Mother's Prayer"	—	41	―	―		Joe Tex Spills the Beans
1972	"You Said a Bad Word" b/w "It Ain't Gonna Work Baby"	41	12	―	―		I Gotcha
1973	"King Thaadeus" b/w "Rain Go Away"	—	—	―	―		Joe Tex Spills the Beans
1973	"Woman Stealer" b/w "Cat's Got Her Tongue"	103	41	―	―		Joe Tex Spills the Beans
1973	"All the Heaven a Man Really Needs" b/w "Let's Go Somewhere and Talk"	—	—	―	―		Joe Tex Spills the Beans
1973	"Trying to Win Your Love" b/w "I've Seen Enough" (Non-album track)	—	—	―	―		Joe Tex Spills the Beans
1975	"Under Your Powerful Love" b/w "Sassy Sexy Wiggle"	—	27	―	―		Non-album tracks
1975	"I'm Going Back Again" b/w "My Body Wants You"	—	—	―	―		Non-album tracks
1975	"Have You Ever" b/w "Baby, It's Rainin'"	—	74	―	―		Non-album tracks
1975	"Love Shortage" b/w "Mama Red"	—	—	―	―		Non-album tracks
1977	"Ain't Gonna Bump No More (With No Big Fat Woman)" b/w "I Mess Up Everything I Get My Hands On"	12	7	2	2	BPI: Silver	Bumps & Bruises
1977	"Hungry for Your Love" b/w "I Almost Got to Heaven Once"	—	84	―	―		Bumps & Bruises
1977	"Rub Down" b/w "Be Kind to Old People"	—	70	―	―		Rub Down
1978	"Get Back, Leroy" b/w "You Can Be My Star"	—	—	―	―		Rub Down
1979	"Loose Caboose" b/w "Music Ain't Got No Color"	—	48	―	―		He Who Is Without Funk Cast the First Stone
1979	"Who Gave Birth to the Funk" b/w "If You Don't Want the Man (Don't Take the Money)"	—	—	―	―		He Who Is Without Funk Cast the First Stone
1979	"Discomonia" b/w "Fat People"	—	—	―	―		Non-album tracks
1980	"Stick Your Key In (and Start Your Car)" b/w "Lady J. (I Love You)"	—	—	―	―		Non-album tracks
1981	"Don't Do Da Do" b/w "Here Comes No. 34 (Do the Earl Campbell)" (first pressings) "Loose Caboose" (later pressings)	—	—	―	―		Non-album tracks
"—" denotes releases that did not chart or were not released in that territory.

== Soundtrack Inclusions (Joe Tex performances) ==
- 1970 The Boys in the Band ("Take the Fifth Amendment")
- 1992 Reservoir Dogs ("I Gotcha")
- 1993 Love Is Like That ("The Love You Save (May Be Your Own)")
- 1995 Go Now ("Show Me", "Woman Like That Yeah", "I'm a Man", "I Want To (Do Everything for You)", "A Sweet Woman Like You", "I'll Never Do You Wrong")
- 1995 Sabrina ("Love's in Need of Love Today")
- 1996 I Shot Andy Warhol ("Ain't Gonna Bump No More with No Big Fat Woman")
- 1999 Edtv ("Have You Ever")
- 2000 The Visit ("You Said a Bad Word")
- 2000 Jesus' Son ("The Love You Save (May Be Your Own)")
- 2002 Serving Sara ("I Gotcha")
- 2004: When Will I Be Loved ("Hold On to What You've Got")
- 2004 Mr. 3000 ("I Gotcha")
- 2007 Music Within ("Papa Was Too")
- 2007 Death Proof ("The Love You Save (May Be Your Own)")
- 2007 Grindhouse ("The Love You Save (May Be Your Own)")
- 2008 The Wire (1 episode, "Just Out of Reach")
- 2018 Ash vs Evil Dead (1 episode, "You Said a Bad Word")
