= Skinny Legs and All (song) =

Single by Joe Tex

from the album Live and Lively
- B-side: "Watch the One (That Brings the Bad News)"
- Released: 1967
- Recorded: 1967
- Studio: American (Memphis, Tennessee)
- Genre: Soul, southern soul
- Length: 3:10
- Label: Dial/Atlantic
- Songwriter: Joe Tex
- Producer: Buddy Killen

Joe Tex singles chronology
"Show Me" (1967)	"Skinny Legs and All" (1967)	"I'll Never Do You Wrong" (1968)

"Skinny Legs and All" is a song composed and recorded by soul singer Joe Tex and released on the Dial label in 1967. The single was later featured on Tex's "live" album, Live and Lively a year later in 1968.

== Background and recording ==
By 1967, Joe Tex had been recording for over a decade but started reaching his commercial peak in the mid-1960s with the releases of R&B hits such as "I Want To (Do Everything For You)", "A Sweet Woman Like You" and "Hold What You've Got", which became the first song in the Southern soul style to become a top five pop record. The three aforementioned records had also peaked at number-one on the R&B singles charts.

Tex was also known as an energetic live performer whose intense dancing was often compared to the likes of Jackie Wilson and James Brown. Two of his major trademarks, which Tex accused James Brown of stealing from him, was doing microphone stand kicks and adapting a cape, the latter of which Tex poked fun of during a rare joint headlining gig with both musicians, in which he covered Brown's hit "Please, Please, Please" but in the middle as his emcee dropped the cape on him, Tex yelled "please, please, please...get this cape off me!" which didn't go over well with Brown, who allegedly later shot at Tex and his entourage at a nightclub after the show. Luckily for Tex and his entourage, no one was injured.

In 1967, Tex's producer Buddy Killen decided to record a "live show" of Tex's, which was actually cut at American Studios. Killen would later include a live audience to give it a feeling of an actual live show. One of the last songs Tex did was a novelty type of song he had composed on the spot titled "Skinny Legs and All" in which he poked fun at a man who was ignoring a woman he was with who apparently had skinny legs. Tex advised the woman to dump her lover because "someone out there will take you, Miss skinny legs and all". He later mocked a woman for similarly treating a man with "raggedy clothes" and advised the guy to do the same thing. Tex would later tell an interviewer in 1972 that he got the inspiration to write the song while in Alabama and noticing a man arguing with his wife who was reportedly skinny and holding two bags of groceries, which frustrated her husband, causing an argument. Joe said he said to himself about what he'd say to the woman, "‘Walk on baby’. If that man don’t want you in public someone else will." During his early years with The Jackson 5, Michael Jackson, who later listed Tex as one of his idols, performed the song and often did it going into audiences and peeking under women's skirts on the behest of his father Joseph.

== Song performance and release ==
The song was released in the spring of that year and became a top ten hit on the pop charts, reaching #10 and later going gold. It was Tex's biggest hit until the release of "I Gotcha" in 1972.

== Charts ==
Chart (1967–1968)	Peak position
US Billboard Hot 100	10
US Best Selling R&B Singles (Billboard)	2

== Personnel ==
- Reggie Young – electric guitar
- Tommy Cogbill – bass
- Gene Chrisman – drums
- Horn section
