= List of Top Selling R&B Singles number ones of 1966 =

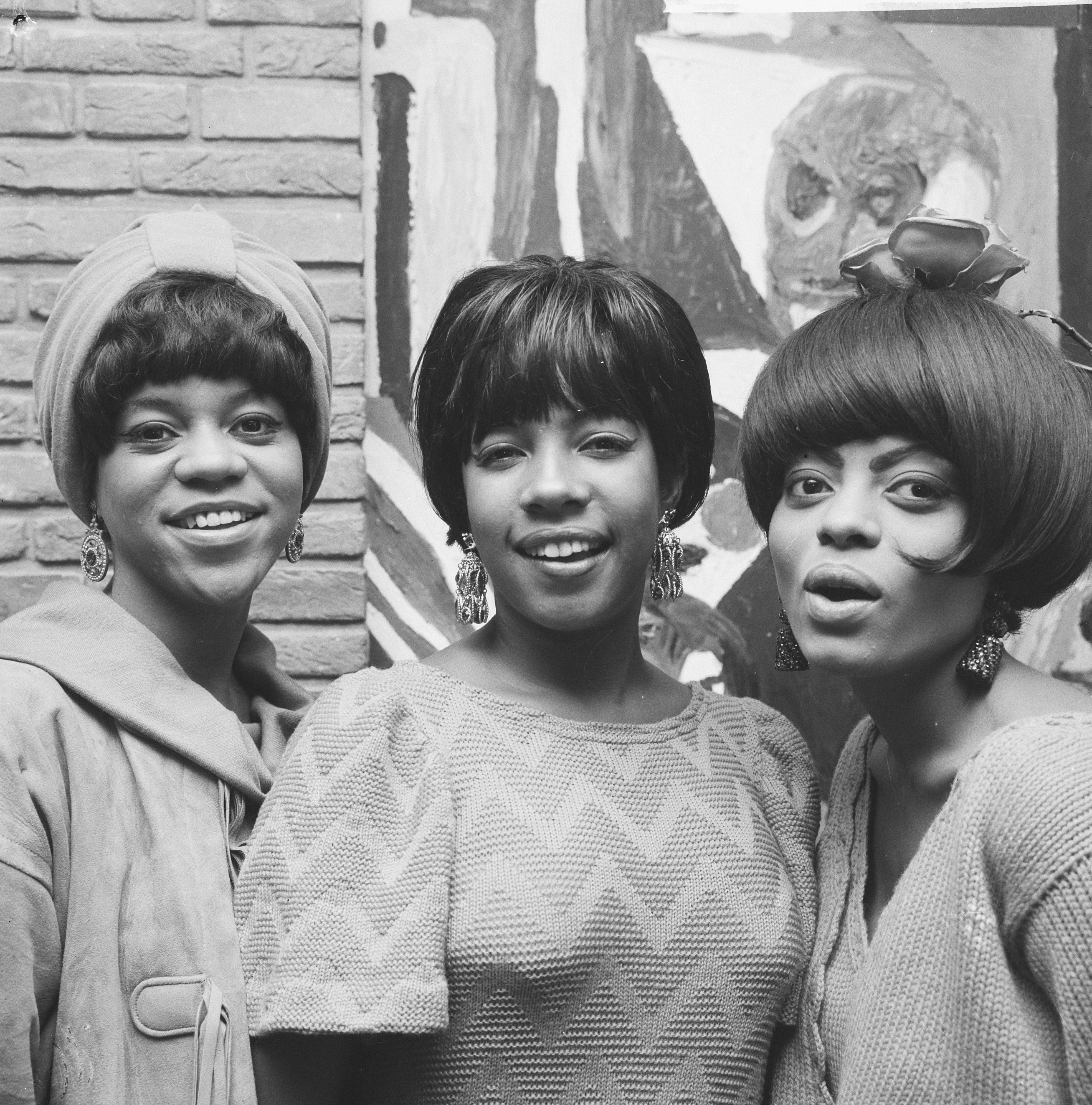
The Supremes had two number ones ("You Can't Hurry Love" and "You Keep Me Hangin' On") in 1966.

In 1966, Billboard published a chart ranking the top-performing singles in the United States in rhythm and blues (R&B) and related African American-oriented music genres; the chart has undergone various name changes over the decades to reflect the evolution of such genres and since 2005 has been published as Hot R&B/Hip-Hop Songs. During the year, 20 different singles topped the chart, which was published under the title Top Selling Rhythm & Blues Singles through the issue dated April 2 and Top Selling R&B Singles thereafter.

In the issue of Billboard dated January 1, James Brown was at number one with "I Got You (I Feel Good)", the song's fifth week in the top spot. It was displaced the following week by "A Sweet Woman Like You" by Joe Tex, but returned to the top of the chart for one final week in the issue dated January 15. Many of the year's chart-toppers were released on the Motown label, including singles by Stevie Wonder, the Temptations, the Supremes and the Four Tops. Motown is regarded as one of the most successful and influential labels of the 20th century and as having brought unprecedented levels of mainstream success to black music. The Temptations were the year's most successful act, achieving four chart-toppers with "Get Ready", "Ain't Too Proud to Beg", "Beauty Is Only Skin Deep" and "(I Know) I'm Losing You", which spent a cumulative total of sixteen weeks in the top spot, the highest figure for any act. "Ain't Too Proud to Beg" spent eight non-consecutive weeks at number one, the longest time spent in the top spot by a song. The longest unbroken run at number one was seven weeks, achieved by Wilson Pickett's "634-5789 (Soulsville, U.S.A.)".

In addition to the Temptations, four other acts achieved more than one number one during 1966. Brown gained his second chart-topper of the year in June with "It's a Man's Man's Man's World". Pickett topped the chart for seven weeks in March and April with "634-5789 (Soulsville, U.S.A.)" and for a single week in September with "Land of a Thousand Dances", the Supremes spent time at number one in the last quarter of the year with both "You Can't Hurry Love" and "You Keep Me Hangin' On", and Wonder reached the peak position with both "Uptight (Everything's Alright)" and his recording of Bob Dylan's song "Blowin' in the Wind". Artists who topped the chart for the first time in 1966 included Rock and Roll Hall of Fame inductee Percy Sledge, who spent four weeks at number one with "When a Man Loves a Woman"; it also topped the all-genre Hot 100 chart and would prove to be his signature song, but was his only chart-topper.

== Chart history ==
Key
| † | Indicates best-charting R&B single of 1966 |

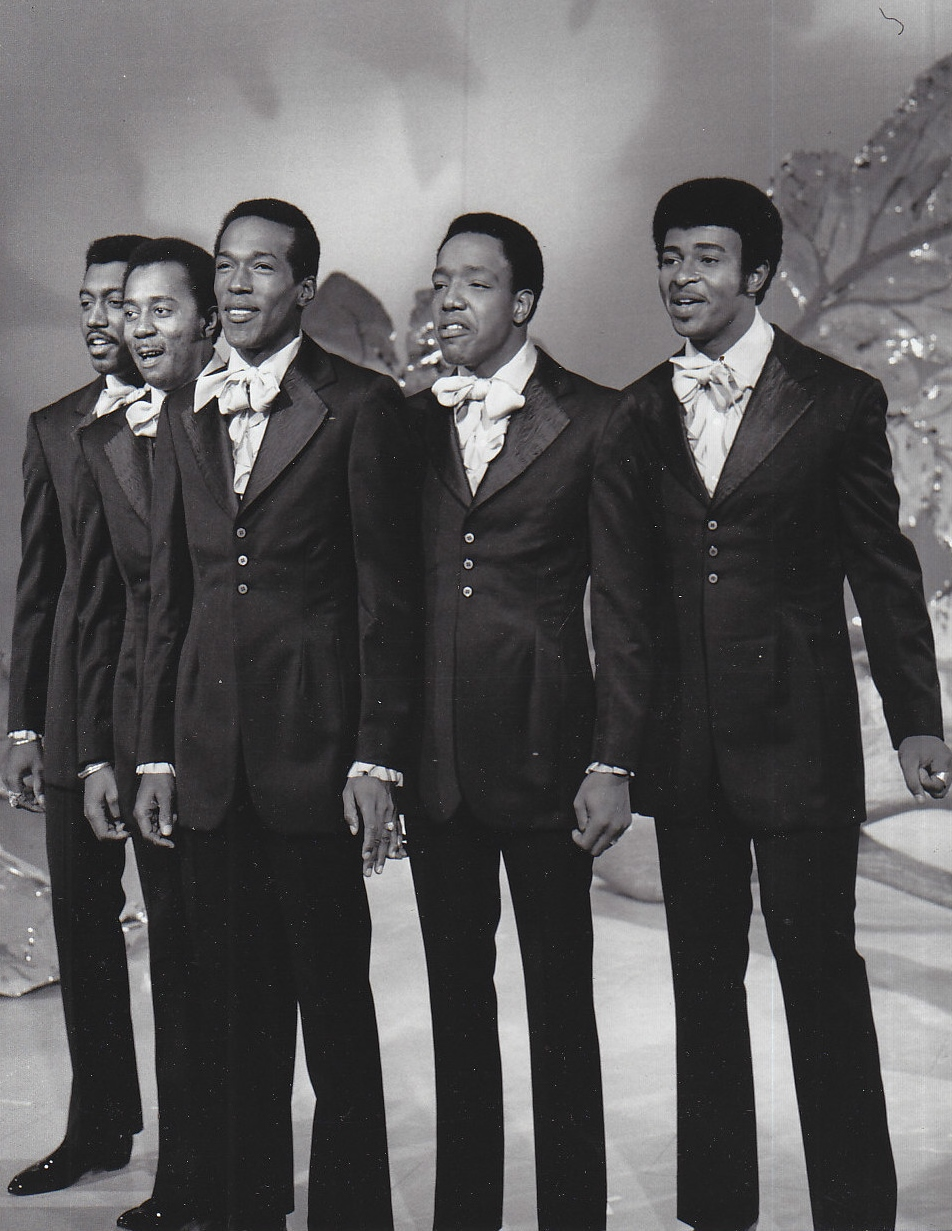
The Temptations had four number ones in 1966: "Get Ready", "Ain't Too Proud to Beg", "Beauty Is Only Skin Deep", and "(I Know) I'm Losing You".

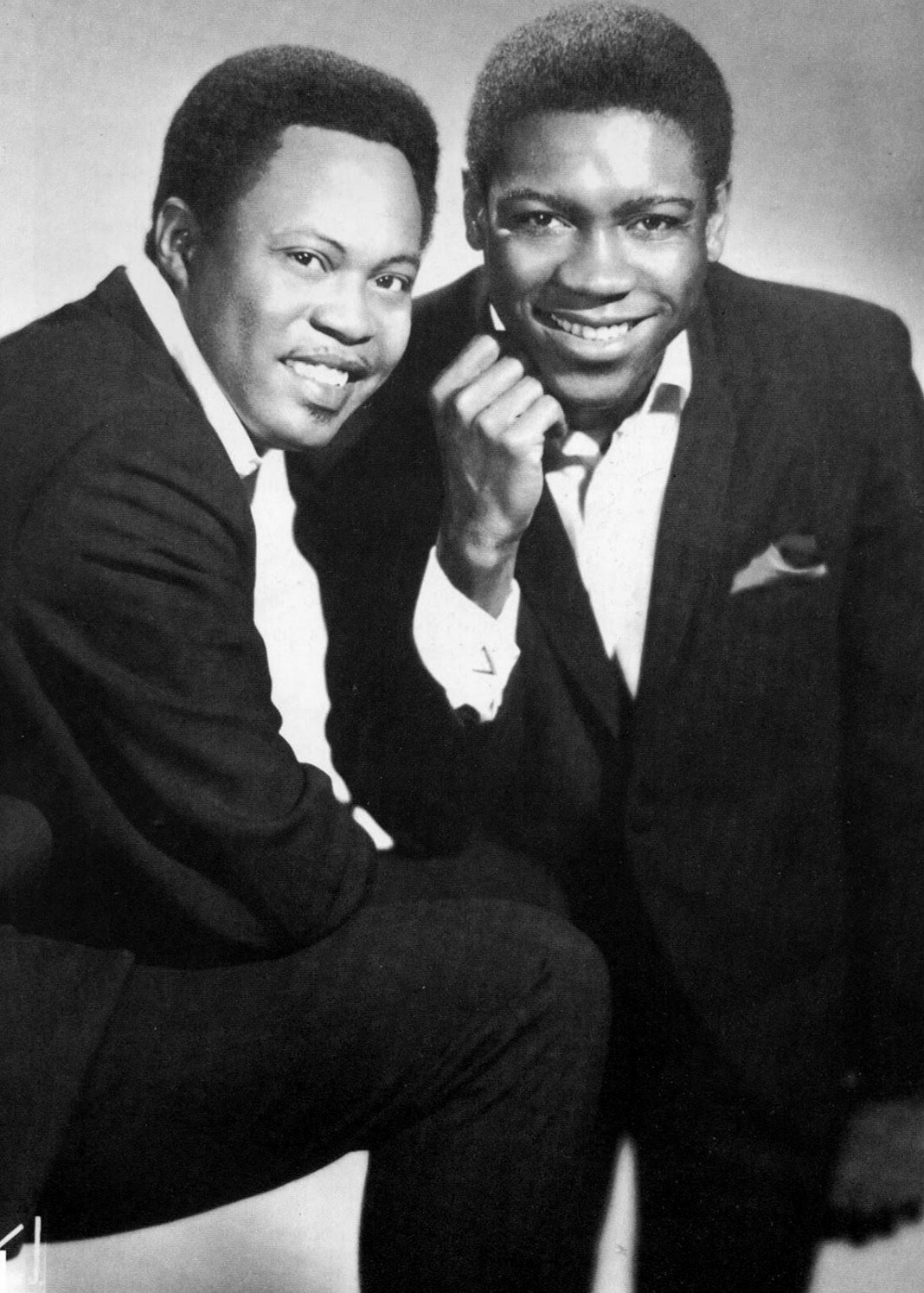
Sam & Dave topped the chart with "Hold On! I'm a Comin'".

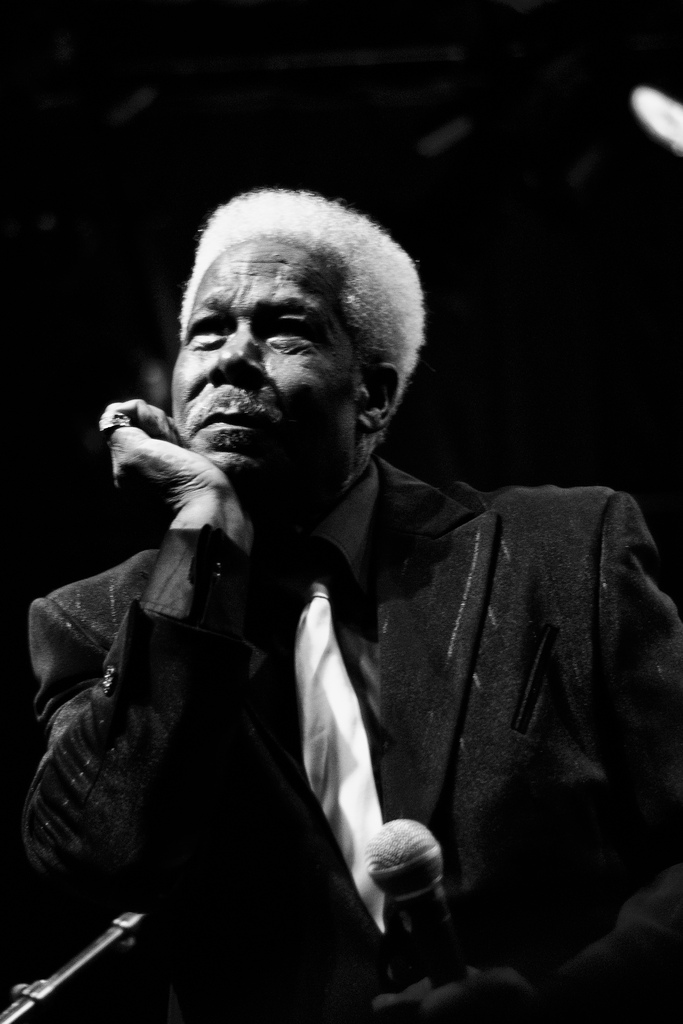
Eddie Floyd reached number one with "Knock On Wood". He also co-wrote "634-5789 (Soulsville, U.S.A.)", a chart-topper for Wilson Pickett.

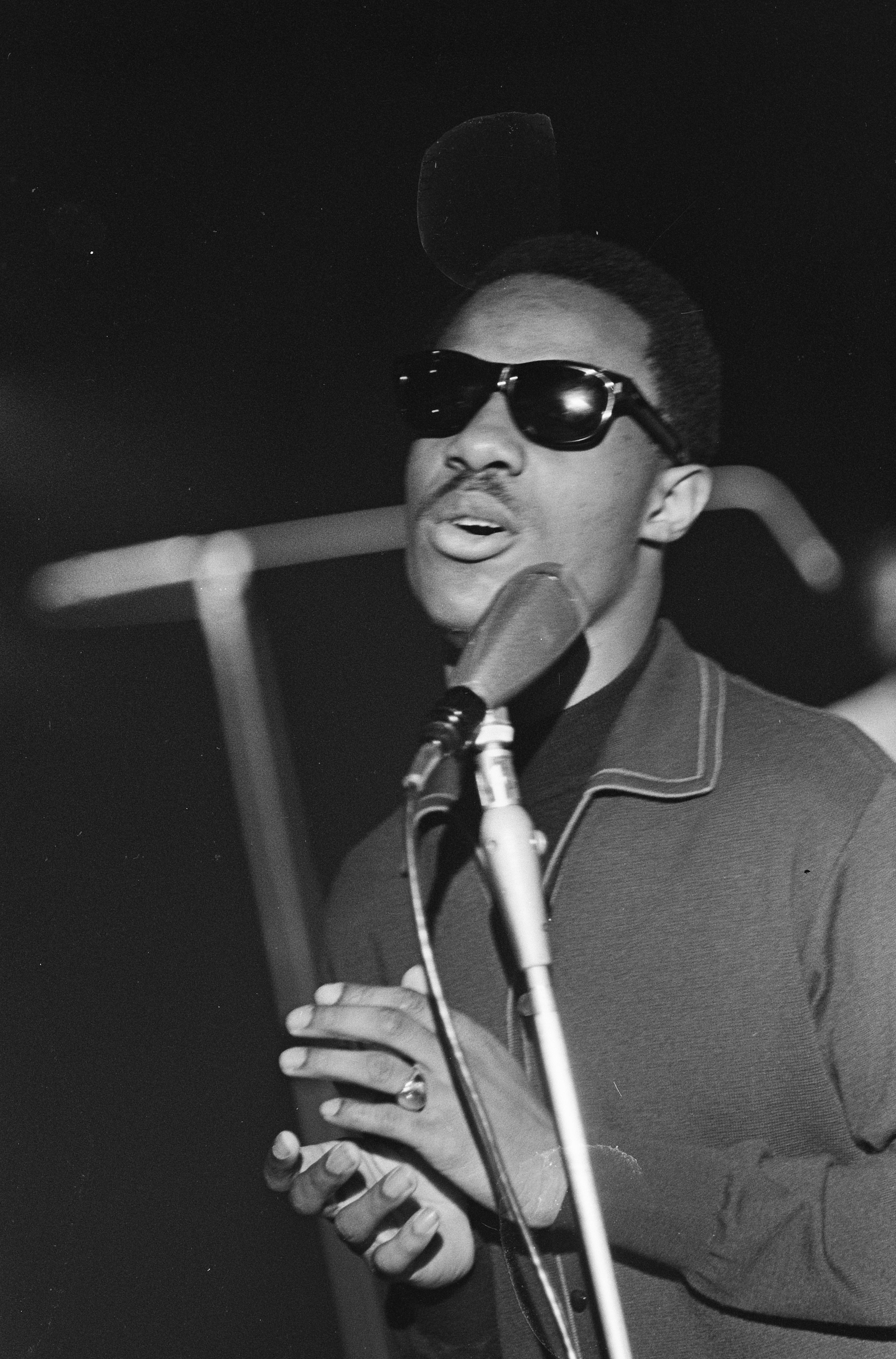
Stevie Wonder had two number ones ("Uptight (Everything's Alright)" and "Blowin' in the Wind") in 1966.

Chart history
| Issue date | Title | Artist(s) | Ref. |
|---|---|---|---|
| January 1 | "I Got You (I Feel Good)" | James Brown | |
| January 8 | "A Sweet Woman Like You" | Joe Tex | |
| January 15 | "I Got You (I Feel Good)" | James Brown | |
| January 22 | "Uptight (Everything's Alright)" | Stevie Wonder | |
| January 29 | "Uptight (Everything's Alright)" | Stevie Wonder | |
| February 5 | "Uptight (Everything's Alright)" | Stevie Wonder | |
| February 12 | "Uptight (Everything's Alright)" | Stevie Wonder | |
| February 19 | "Uptight (Everything's Alright)" | Stevie Wonder | |
| February 26 | "Baby Scratch My Back" | Slim Harpo | |
| March 5 | "Baby Scratch My Back" | Slim Harpo | |
| March 12 | "634-5789 (Soulsville, U.S.A.)" | Wilson Pickett | |
| March 19 | "634-5789 (Soulsville, U.S.A.)" | Wilson Pickett | |
| March 26 | "634-5789 (Soulsville, U.S.A.)" | Wilson Pickett | |
| April 2 | "634-5789 (Soulsville, U.S.A.)" | Wilson Pickett | |
| April 9 | "634-5789 (Soulsville, U.S.A.)" | Wilson Pickett | |
| April 16 | "634-5789 (Soulsville, U.S.A.)" | Wilson Pickett | |
| April 23 | "634-5789 (Soulsville, U.S.A.)" | Wilson Pickett | |
| April 30 | "Get Ready" | The Temptations | |
| May 7 | "When a Man Loves a Woman" | Percy Sledge | |
| May 14 | "When a Man Loves a Woman" | Percy Sledge | |
| May 21 | "When a Man Loves a Woman" | Percy Sledge | |
| May 28 | "When a Man Loves a Woman" | Percy Sledge | |
| June 4 | "It's a Man's Man's Man's World" | James Brown | |
| June 11 | "It's a Man's Man's Man's World" | James Brown | |
| June 18 | "Hold On! I'm Comin'" † | Sam & Dave | |
| June 25 | "Ain't Too Proud to Beg" | The Temptations | |
| July 2 | "Ain't Too Proud to Beg" | The Temptations | |
| July 9 | "Ain't Too Proud to Beg" | The Temptations | |
| July 16 | "Ain't Too Proud to Beg" | The Temptations | |
| July 23 | "Let's Go Get Stoned" | Ray Charles | |
| July 30 | "Ain't Too Proud to Beg" | The Temptations | |
| August 6 | "Ain't Too Proud to Beg" | The Temptations | |
| August 13 | "Ain't Too Proud to Beg" | The Temptations | |
| August 20 | "Ain't Too Proud to Beg" | The Temptations | |
| August 27 | "Blowin' in the Wind" | Stevie Wonder | |
| September 3 | "You Can't Hurry Love" | The Supremes | |
| September 10 | "You Can't Hurry Love" | The Supremes | |
| September 17 | "Land of a Thousand Dances" | Wilson Pickett | |
| September 24 | "Beauty Is Only Skin Deep" | The Temptations | |
| October 1 | "Beauty Is Only Skin Deep" | The Temptations | |
| October 8 | "Beauty Is Only Skin Deep" | The Temptations | |
| October 15 | "Beauty Is Only Skin Deep" | The Temptations | |
| October 22 | "Beauty Is Only Skin Deep" | The Temptations | |
| October 29 | "Reach Out I'll Be There" | The Four Tops | |
| November 5 | "Reach Out I'll Be There" | The Four Tops | |
| November 12 | "Love Is a Hurtin' Thing" | Lou Rawls | |
| November 19 | "Knock On Wood" | Eddie Floyd | |
| November 26 | "You Keep Me Hangin' On" | The Supremes | |
| December 3 | "You Keep Me Hangin' On" | The Supremes | |
| December 10 | "You Keep Me Hangin' On" | The Supremes | |
| December 17 | "You Keep Me Hangin' On" | The Supremes | |
| December 24 | "(I Know) I'm Losing You" | The Temptations | |
| December 31 | "(I Know) I'm Losing You" | The Temptations | |
