= The Daybreakers =

The Daybreakers may refer to:

- The Daybreakers (band), an American garage rock and psychedelic band
- The Daybreakers (novel), a 1960 novel by Louis L'Amour

== See also ==
- Daybreaker (disambiguation)
- Daybreakers, a 2009 science-fiction action horror film
