= George Kent =

George Kent may refer to:

- George Kent Ltd, a British engineering company
- Walter George Kent (1858–1938), chairman and managing director of George Kent Ltd
- George E. Kent (1920–1982), American professor of literature
- George P. Kent, American diplomat

== See also ==
- Prince George, Duke of Kent (1902–1942)
- Jacob & Youngs, Inc. v. Kent, a case in which George Kent was defendant
