= Porthole =

Window of a ship

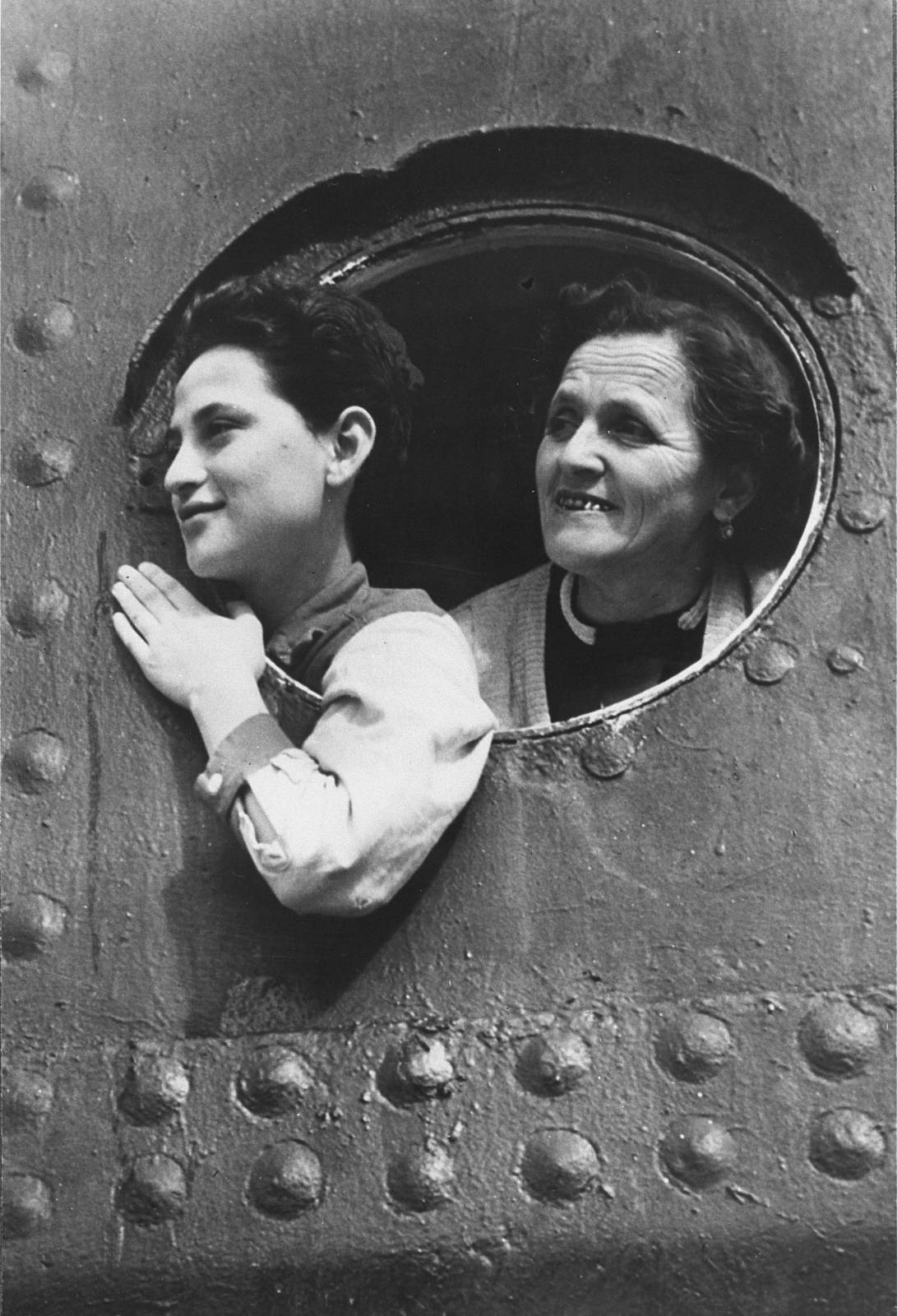
Jewish refugees look out through a porthole of a ship while docked in the port of Haifa, c. 1950–1959

A porthole, sometimes called bull's-eye window or bull's-eye, is a generally circular window used on the hull of ships to admit light and air. Though the term is of maritime origin, it is also used to describe round windows on armored vehicles, aircraft, automobiles (the Ford Thunderbird is a notable example) and even spacecraft.

On a ship, the function of a porthole, when open, is to permit light and fresh air to enter the dark and often damp below-deck quarters of the vessel. It also affords below-deck occupants a limited view to the outside world. When closed, the porthole provides a strong water-tight, weather-tight and sometimes light-tight barrier.

A porthole on a ship may also be called a sidescuttle or side scuttle (side hole), as officially termed in the International Convention for the Safety of Life at Sea. This term is used in the U.S. Code of Federal Regulations. It is also used in related rules and regulations for the construction of ships. The use of the word "sidescuttle" instead of "porthole" is meant to be broad, including any covered or uncovered hole in the side of the vessel. A deadlight is a hinged metal cover which can be clamped over the porthole to secure it in heavy weather.

== Etymology ==
According to the Navy Department Library, the word "porthole" has nothing to do with its location on the port side of a ship, but originated during the reign of Henry VII of England (1485). The king insisted on mounting guns too large for his ships and therefore the conventional methods of securing the weapons on the forecastle and aftcastle could not be used. A French shipbuilder named James Baker was commissioned to solve the problem, which he did by piercing the ship's sides so the cannon could be mounted inside the fore and aft castles. For heavy weather and when the cannons were not in use, the openings were fitted with covers, that were called porte in French, meaning "door". "Porte" was Anglicized to "port" and later corrupted to porthole. Eventually, it came to mean any opening in a ship's side whether for cannon or not.

== Structure ==
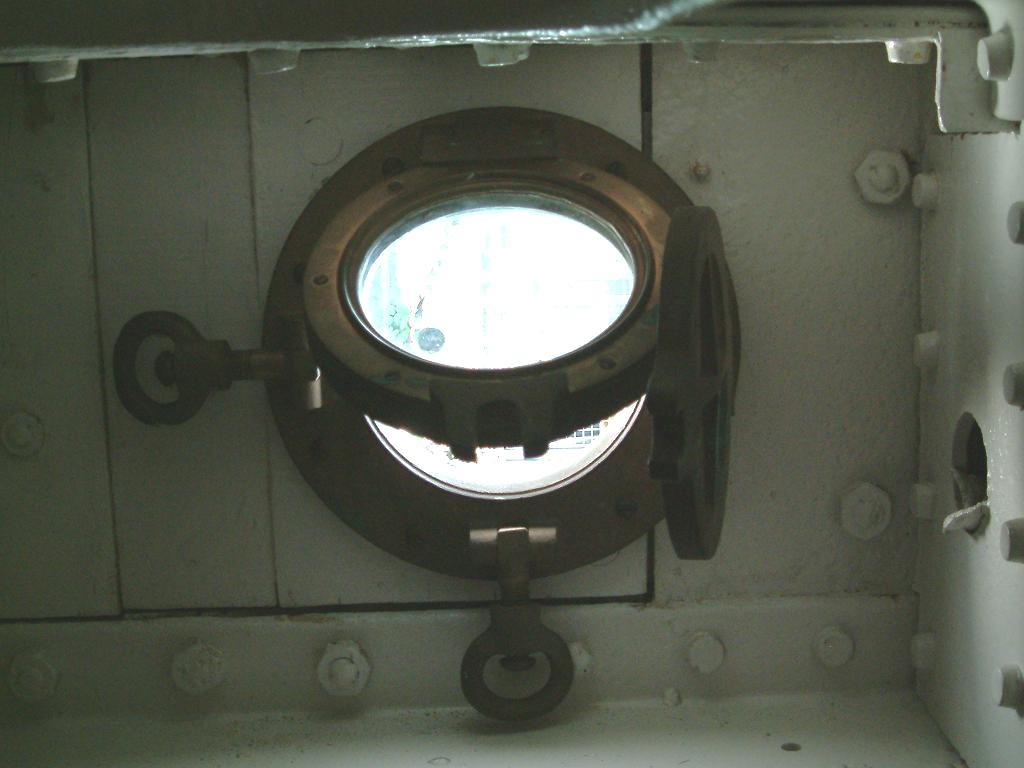
A brass porthole with hinged window and storm cover

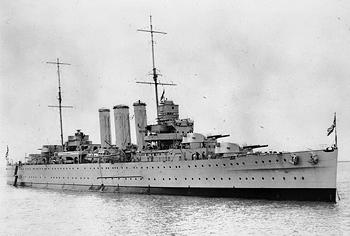
Rows of portholes can be seen on the hull of HMS Cornwall, a British heavy cruiser from the 1920s

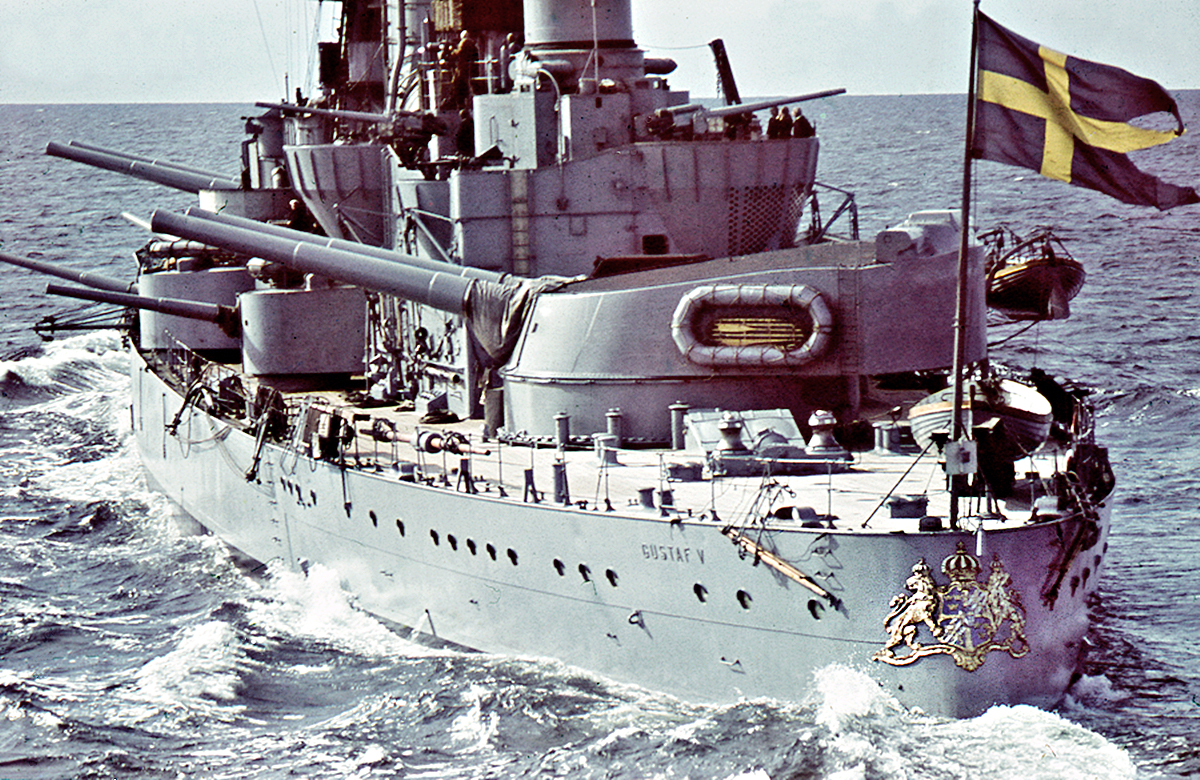
Rows of portholes on the hull of Swedish HM Pansarskepp Gustaf V with gun Bofors 283 mm (until 1957).

A porthole consists of at least two structural components and is, in its simplest form, similar to any other type of window in design and purpose. The porthole is primarily a circular glass disk, known as a portlight, encased in a metal frame that is bolted securely into the side of a ship's hull. Sometimes the glass disk of a porthole is encased in a separate frame which is hinged onto the base frame so that it can be opened and closed. In addition, many portholes also have metal storm covers that can be securely fastened against the window when necessary. The main purpose of the storm cover is, as its name implies, to protect the window from heavy seas. It is also used to block light from entering lower berths when darkness is preferred. The storm cover is referred to as a deadlight in maritime parlance. Storm covers are also used on navy and merchant marine ships to prevent interior light from escaping the ship's lower berths, and to provide protection from hostile fire. Hinged porthole windows and storm covers are accessible from inside the ship's hull and are typically fastened to their closed positions by hand-tightening several pivoting, threaded devices, commonly referred to as "dogs". Older portholes can be identified by the protruding collar of their base plate which may be up to several inches deep, thus accommodating the thickness of a wooden hull.

Portholes range in diameter from several inches to more than two feet, and weigh from several pounds to over one hundred pounds. Much of the porthole's weight comes from its glass, which, on ships, can be as much as two inches thick. Metal components of a porthole are also typically very heavy; they are usually sand-cast and made of bronze, brass, steel, iron, or aluminium. Bronze and brass are most commonly used, favoured for their resistance to saltwater corrosion. The design of the porthole is such that it achieves its purposes without sacrificing the integrity of the ship's hull. The porthole's thick glass and rugged construction, tightly spaced fasteners, and its round shape all contribute to its purpose of maintaining hull strength and withstanding the pressure of storm waves crashing against it.

Recently, there has been a decline in the number of portholes on larger ships. Cruise liners have higher superstructures with more upper deck cabins which can have large windows and balconies. Most warships no longer have portholes on their main hulls as they could weaken them and modern vessels have air conditioning and strong lighting below decks, meaning that they are no longer necessary.

== Spacecraft portholes ==
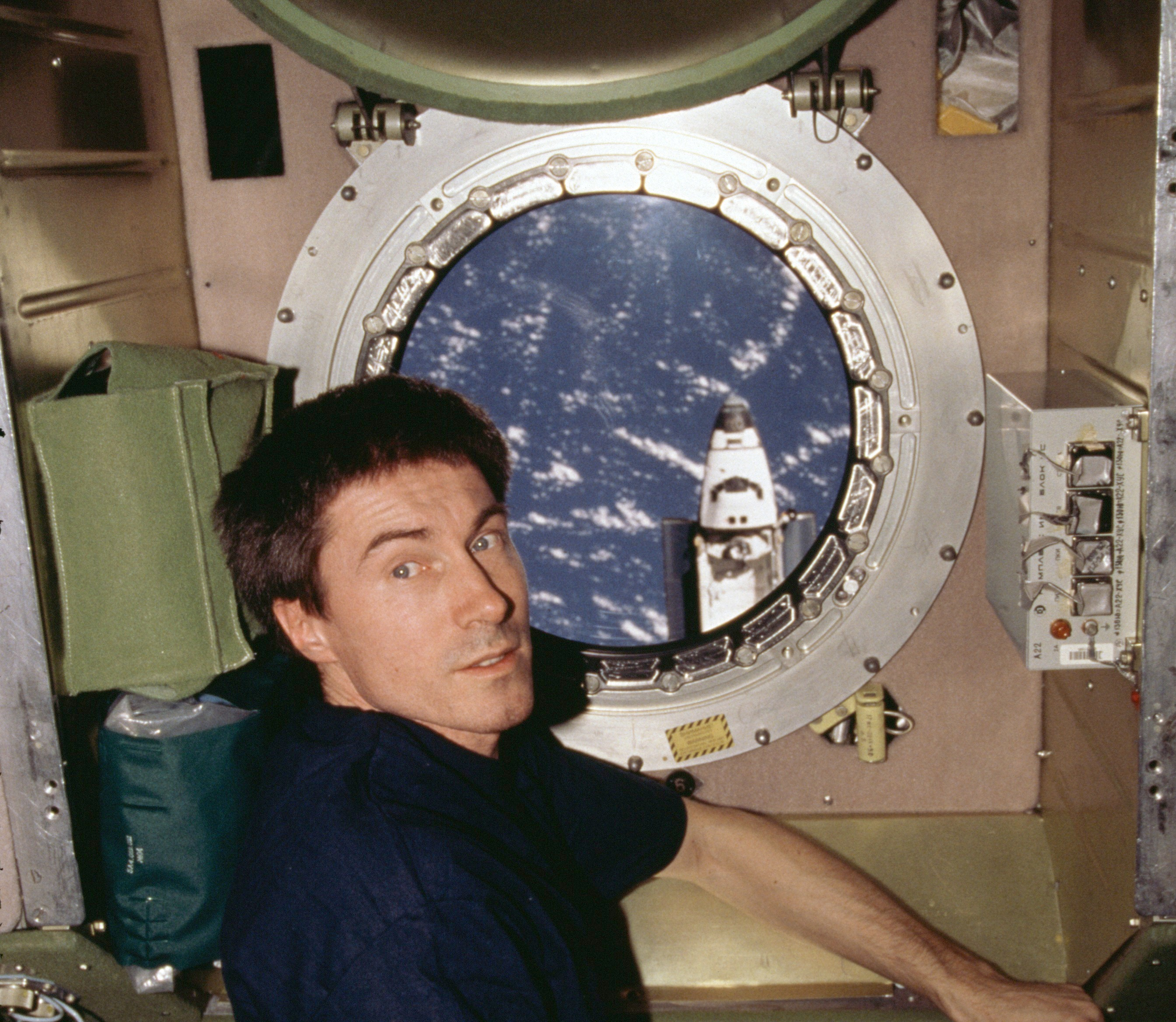
Cosmonaut Sergei Krikalev in front of a porthole in the Zvezda component of the International Space Station

Portholes on spacecraft must be made from glass that can survive rapid temperature changes without suffering the cracking that can result from thermal shock. Some of those on the International Space Station, particularly those in the Russian modules, are made from quartz glass mounted in titanium-alloy frames and sealed with vacuum-resistant rubber rings. Reflective surfaces within these portholes are coated with a special optical enamel to reduce glare. The windows also have shrouds or doors to protect them from micro-meteorites.

On the Apollo space capsules, a porthole was located in the hatch that the astronauts used at the beginning and end of each flight.

== Submarine portholes ==
Portholes on submarines are generally made of acrylic plastic. In the case of deep diving submarines, the portholes can be several inches thick. The edge of the acrylic is usually conically tapered such that the external pressure forces the acrylic window against the seat. Usually such windows are flat rather than spherically dished. This decreases the area that can be viewed, but eliminates distortion associated with curved glass.

== See also ==
- 1900 Hoboken Docks fire
- Clear view screen
- Deck prism
