= Little Archie (singer) =

American singer and musician (1942–2011)

Archie Patrick Himons
- Also known as: Little Archie; Aashid Himons
- Born: September 22, 1942; West Virginia, United States
- Died: March 19, 2011 (aged 68) Nashville, Tennessee, United States
- Genres: Country blues, reggae, world music, soul music
- Occupations: Singer, musician
- Instruments: Piano, drums
- Years active: 1960s–2011
- Label: Dial Records

Archie Patrick Himons, also known as Little Archie and latterly Aashid Himons, (September 22, 1942 – March 19, 2011) was an American singer and musician born in West Virginia. He was "a musical innovator that fused traditional country blues with reggae and world music during the late 1970s" and is best known for his "blu-reggae" band Afrikan Dreamland.

== Biography ==
Himons was born in rural West Virginia and learned to play the piano by the age of three and the drums by the time he was five years old. At the age of ten, he made his debut performing on national television on NBC's The Today Show.

He began his music career as pianist and soul singer signed to Dial Records by Buddy Killen in 1966. He had two popular soul singles "All I Have To Do", and "You Can't Tie Me Down".

In the 1970s he converted to Rastafari. He moved to Nashville, Tennessee, in 1979, where he finished recording Jah Messenger, the first album of the Afrikan Dreamland group that he fronted.

He died at the age of 68 in Nashville on March 19, 2011, at Vanderbilt University Medical Center of complications from diabetes and vascular disease.
