= Wayne Handy =

- Handy c. 1957

Background information
- Birth name: Wayne Jackson Handy
- Born: May 14, 1935
- Origin: Eden, North Carolina, U.S.
- Died: April 1, 2025 (aged 89); Devon, Pennsylvania, U.S.
- Genres: Rock and roll, rockabilly
- Occupation(s): Singer, banker
- Labels: Renown, Dial

Wayne Jackson Handy (May 14, 1935 – April 1, 2025) was an American rock and roll singer.

== Life and career ==
=== Early life ===
Wayne Jackson Handy was born on May 14, 1935, in what is now Eden, North Carolina. He grew up in neighboring Reidsville, North Carolina, a once thriving tobacco town and home to the American Tobacco Company. Wayne's father was a farmer and letter carrier, and his mother a housewife. The last of five children, Wayne enjoyed singing popular church songs with his sister, Frances. In 1956 he joined a Reidsville swing dance band called The Blue Flames, for which he provided the vocals.

=== Music career ===
In 1957 he was scouted by a local man to come down to Durham, North Carolina, and sing on the local television show Saturday Night Country Style with Jim Thornton. Watching the performance that night was Howard Rambeau, the owner of a small Durham label called Renown Records. Howard called the TV station that night before Wayne left to ask if he wanted to record for Renown. Wayne signed with Renown and released his first single "Say Yeah" in 1957. Authored by Handy, "Say Yeah" was later recorded by rockabilly artist Sammy Salvo, The Southerners, and Ollie Shephard.

Wayne recorded with some moderately well-known musicians at the time such as The Melody Masters, the King Sisters from Danville, Virginia, and the saxophonist Boots Randolph. In 1957 he was asked to appear in Philadelphia on the television show American Bandstand with Dick Clark. After his performance, he was driven back to the airport by a representative from the show who informed Handy that if he wanted Bandstand to keep playing his songs, he or Renown Records would have to enter into a "pay to play" (also called "payola") deal with the show. Neither Handy nor Renown Records would cooperate.

Disillusioned by the music industry, Handy joined the US Army in 1958 and was stationed in Alaska. After his Army enlistment, he returned to North Carolina to enroll at the University of North Carolina at Chapel Hill and pursue a degree in Business. Handy continued to record with Howard Rambeau off and on until 1962 when his contract with Renown Records ended. In the 1960s and 1970s he collaborated with a musician friend, Harold Langdon, to entertain with original songs at social events as Handy and Landy. They also released one single on the JCP label of Raleigh, N.C. in the early 1960s.

=== Later life and death ===
Handy retired from mortgage banking in the early 2000s and lived in Greensboro, North Carolina. After the death of his wife in 2018, and in declining health, he moved to Devon, Pennsylvania in 2023 to be closer to family. He died there in hospice care on April 1, 2025, at the age of 89. His music is still appreciated by fans of vintage American rock n' roll and rockabilly around the world.

== Style ==
Handy was influenced by Little Richard and Chuck Berry, and was part of the original American rock and roll movement. His songs ranged from raucous rockabilly to crooning ballads.

== Discography ==
Handy recorded six singles with Renown Records, which frequently leased Handy's songs to music distributors and publishers including Trend Records, Parkway Records, and Dial Records. All of his recorded songs, except for "You'll Never Be Mine" and "Conscience Let Me Go", were authored by him. His most well-known song was "Say Yeah". Today his songs can be found on multiple compilations of rockabilly and country rock music from the 1950s. The complete list of his published songs:

- "Say Yeah" - 1957, Renown Records
- "Could It Be" - 1957, Renown Records
- "Betcha' Didn't Know" - 1958, Renown Records/Trend Records
- "Seminole Rock n' Roll" - 1958, Renown Records/Trend Records
- "Don't Be Unfair" - 1958 Renown Records/Trend Records
- "I'll Never Be the Same" - 1959, Renown Records
- "I Think You Oughta' Look Again" - 1959, Renown Records/Trend Records
- "Problem Child" - 1959, Renown Records
- "So Much to Remember" - 1960, Renown Records/Parkway Records
- "You'll Never Be Mine" - 1960, Renown Records/Parkway Records
- "Pain Reliever" - 1961, Renown Records/Dial Records
- "Conscience Let Me Go" - 1961, Renown Records/Dial Records

Handy's name is erroneously printed as "Wayne C. Handy" on some of his singles.
