= Bumps & Bruises (Joe Tex album) =

Studio album by Joe Tex
- Released: 1977
- Studio: Sound Ship, Nashville, Tennessee
- Genre: R&B, soul
- Label: Epic; PE 34666
- Producer: Buddy Killen

Joe Tex chronology
Another Man's Woman (1977)	Bumps & Bruises (1977)	Rub Down (1978)

Bumps & Bruises is an album by the American R&B musician Joe Tex, released in 1977 via Epic Records.

The album peaked at No. 108 on the Billboard 200. "Ain't Gonna Bump No More" was Tex's last major hit, making the top 10 on the R&B chart and the top 20 on the pop chart. The song reached No. 2 on the UK Singles Chart.

== Production ==
The album was recorded in Nashville, Tennessee, and was produced by Buddy Killen.

== Critical reception ==
Professional ratings
Review scores
Source	Rating
AllMusic	3/5 stars
Robert Christgau	B+
The Encyclopedia of Popular Music	2/5 stars
The New Rolling Stone Record Guide	3/5 stars

Robert Christgau praised the "very punchy dance tracks by James Brown out of Stax-Volt," and called Bumps & Bruises "amazingly rich and spirited for a comeback album off a freak hit." The Bay State Banner wrote that it, along with Millie Jackson's Feelin' Bitchy (1977), "kept fans of well-told tales in stitches with Southern country-soul's best blues yarns in years." New Times wrote that "the rebirth of Southern Soul ... is complete with the return of the great Joe Tex ... one of his strongest sets."

The New Rolling Stone Record Guide deemed the album a "charmingly anachronistic [LP] spurred by a hot Nashville session band."

== Track listing ==
No.	Title	Writer(s)	Length
1.	"Ain't Gonna Bump No More (With No Big Fat Woman)"	Bennie Lee McGinty, Buddy Killen	6:45
2.	"Leaving You Dinner"	Joe Tex	3:21
3.	"Be Cool (Willie Is Dancing with a Sissy)"	Joe Tex	5:29
4.	"I Mess Up Everything I Get My Hands On"	Joe Tex	3:05
5.	"We Held On"	Joe Tex, Jerry King, Louis Bernard Johnson	3:24
6.	"I Almost Got to Heaven Once"	Bennie Lee McGinty	3:54
7.	"Hungry for Your Love"	Joe Tex, Jerry King, Louis Bernard Johnson	4:02
8.	"Jump Bad"	Bennie Lee McGinty	3:57
9.	"There's Something Wrong"	Bennie Lee McGinty	2:44
