= Daybreak =

Daybreak most commonly refers to:

- Dawn, the beginning of the twilight before sunrise
- Sunrise, when the upper edge of the Sun appears over the horizon

Daybreak may also refer to:

== Books ==
- Al-Falaq (Dawn, Daybreak), the 113th Sura of the Qur'an
- Daybreak, comic book by Brian Ralph
- Daybreak, adventure book by Ally Kennen
- Daybreak (Nietzsche book), an 1881 book of aphorisms by Friedrich Nietzsche
- Daybreak, a 1968 autobiographical memoir by folk singer Joan Baez

== Films ==
- Daybreak (1918 film), a silent film
- Daybreak (1931 film), an MGM film with Ramon Novarro
- Daybreak (1933 film), a Chinese film directed by Sun Yu
- Le Jour Se Lève, a 1939 French film by Marcel Carnè also known as Daybreak
- Daybreak (1948 film), a British film starring Ann Todd
- Daybreak (1954 film), a West German film directed by Viktor Tourjansky
- Daybreak (1993 film), an HBO film starring Cuba Gooding, Jr., Moira Kelly, Martha Plimpton, and Omar Epps
- Day Break (2005 film), an Iranian film directed by Hamid Rahmanian
- Daybreak (2008 film), a Filipino film
- Amanecer, a 2009 Colombian-Australian film also known as Daybreak
- Daybreak (2017 film), an Albanian film

== Music ==
- Daybreak (band), a South Korean band

=== Albums ===
- Daybreak (Béla Fleck album) or the title song, 1987
- Daybreak (Chet Baker album) or the title track, 1980
- Daybreak (Dave Burrell and David Murray album) or the title track, 1989
- Daybreak (Saves the Day album) or the title song, 2011
- Daybreak, by Leanne & Naara, 2020
- Daybreak, by Mezzoforte, 1993
- Daybreak, by Michael Haggins, or the title song (used in several episodes of Community), 2004
- Daybreak, by Paul Field, 1983
- Daybreak (Woe, Is Me album), 2025

=== Songs ===
- "Daybreak" (Ayumi Hamasaki song), 2002
- "Daybreak" (Barry Manilow song), 1977
- "Daybreak", by Harold Adamson, adapted from Ferde Grofé's 1926 Mississippi Suite, 1942; recorded by several performers
- "Daybreak", by Harry Nilsson from the film Son of Dracula, 1974
- "Daybreak", by Janet Jackson from 20 Y.O., 2006
- "Daybreak", by Linda Perhacs from The Soul of All Natural Things, 2014
- "Daybreak", by Minhyun and JR of NU'EST from Canvas, 2016
- "Daybreak", by Moka Only from Sex Money Moka, 2014
- "Daybreak", by Robin Carolan from the Nosferatu film soundtrack, 2024
- "Daybreak", by the Stone Roses from Second Coming, 1994
- "You're the One for Me" / "Daybreak" / "A.M.", by Paul Hardcastle, 1984

== Radio ==
- Daybreak, the local morning program of CBC Radio One station CBME-FM
- Daybreak USA, an American syndicated talk radio show

== Television ==
- Day Break, a 2006 ABC television series
- CNN Daybreak, a former CNN early day show
- Daybreak (1983 TV series), a defunct British morning television programme that ran from 1983 to 1984
- Daybreak (2010 TV programme), a defunct British morning television programme on ITV that ran from September 2010 until April 2014
- Daybreak (1993 film), a TV movie produced in 1993, starring Cuba Gooding, Jr. and Moira Kelly
- "Daybreak" (Battlestar Galactica), the final two-part episode of the re-imagined Battlestar Galactica television series
- Daybreak, a local morning news show on KATV in Little Rock, Arkansas
- Daybreak (Philippine TV program), a Philippine English-language morning hard-news newscast of 9TV
- Daybreak Scotland, a former regional news broadcaster for the two ITV regions in northern and central Scotland (2007–2010)
- Daybreak (2019 TV series), a Netflix television series

== Other ==
- Daybreak (board game), board game about climate change
- Daybreak (painting), 1922 painting by Maxfield Parrish
- Daybreak Game Company, video game developer and publisher (formerly Sony Online Entertainment)
- Daybreak (community), a planned development in South Jordan, Utah, US

== See also ==
- Daybreaker (disambiguation)
