= Walter George Kent =

Sir Walter Kent
- Born: Walter George Kent; 3 August 1858; Bloomsbury, London
- Died: 11 November 1938 (aged 80); Harrow, London
- Occupations: Chairman and Managing Director
- Spouse: Alice Louisa Kent
- Children: Son and two daughters

Sir Walter George Kent CBE (3 August 1858 – 11 November 1938) was a British businessman who was chairman and managing director of the engineering firm George Kent Ltd which was started by his father, George Kent, in 1838. He was appointed a CBE in 1918 and was knighted in 1929 for political services; he was at the time chairman of the Luton Conservative Association.

Kent died following an operation during the Two-Minute Silence on Armistice Day, while in a Harrow nursing home.
