= The Daybreakers (band) =

American rock band

- Origin: Muscatine, Iowa, U.S.
- Genres: Garage rock
- Years active: 1966–1972
- Label: Dial
- Past members: Max Allan Collins; Mike Bridges; Denny Maxwell; Buddy Busch; Terry Beckey; Paul Thomas; Bruce Peters

The Daybreakers were an American garage rock and psychedelic band from Muscatine, Iowa, who were active in the 1960s. They became one of the most popular bands in their region, which included the Quad Cities. Jack Barlow, a popular DJ and country music recording artist, had them record songs for a planned single at Columbia Recording Studios arranged a contract with Atlantic Records, which released the group's single on their Dial label featuring "Psychedelic Siren," which included siren sound effects generated by a primitive electronic device. Though the song became a big regional hit in Iowa, Atlantic lost interest in the band, and they made no further recordings. In the intervening years, their work has come to the attention of garage rock enthusiasts and has been included in several compilations.

The Daybreakers were inducted into the Iowa "Rock 'n' Roll Hall of Fame" in 2008.

== History ==
The Daybreakers were founded by keyboardist Max Allan Collins in 1966 in Muscatine, Iowa. Collins, a high school senior at Muscatine High School whose father had once been a music teacher there, asked George Dunker, the school guitar teacher, to help recruit musicians for the group. Dunker recommended three junior high students whom Collins found acceptable to form the band's lineup: guitarists Mike Bridges and Denny Maxwell, and drummer Buddy Busch. Bridges would play lead guitar and Maxwell rhythm, with Collins on keyboards and lead vocals, though the other members would occasionally sing leads and harmonies. Collins' father helped the group work out their vocal style. Chuck Bunn, who had played in several other local bands, joined on bass. The band rehearsed in the basement of Collins' parents' house. The Daybreakers quickly became one of the most popular groups in Muscatine. Other popular bands were the XLs, from Wilton and the Night People, from the Quad Cities area. In November 1966, the Daybreakers won the Carnival of Bands competition, held at the Col Ballroom in Davenport. Max Collins, who still has the trophy, recounts:

They had around 30 bands from all over the Midwest, including Minneapolis and Chicago. We won because we did a very different set from everybody else. We did some steps like The Raiders and wore gold sparkle shirts!"

The band became acquainted with Jack Barlow, a popular radio DJ and country music recording artist, who had been a music student of Collins' father. Barlow asked his A&R man, Buddy Killen, to produce a session for the group for a single initially planned to be released for the local market. Collins played Killen six of the group's original songs, including "Psychedelic Siren". When performed live, the band would use a siren effect generated by an electronic device (a primitive version of a synthesizer built by a college classmate of Collins') operated by rhythm guitarist Denny Maxwell. Despite the song's reference to psychedelia, none of the band members did drugs. According to Collins, "...The term 'psychedelic' was largely just a buzz word to the group, describing the sights and sounds of the era". Killen took the group to record at the Columbia Recording Studios, where they recorded "Psychedelic Siren" and four other numbers, including guitarist Mike Bridges' composition "Afterthoughts." Thom Hetzer was brought in to play bass at the session. Killen offered the group a three-year recording deal with Atlantic Records through its Dial label, which released the single "Psychedelic Siren" b/w "Afterthoughts" in December 1967. Each of the group's members was signed to a five-year songwriting contract.

Despite their enthusiasm, on the way back to Muscatine, the group heard Jimi Hendrix and the Doors on the radio and realized that their style of music might soon fall out of fashion. According to Collins, "I think the contract came just as music was changing..." "Psychedelic Siren," nonetheless, became a local and regional hit. It entered the charts at Davenport radio station KSTT in December 1967 and stayed on the charts for over three months. In early 1968, the band did a small tour to promote the single and opened for the Young Rascals and Gary Puckett and the Union Gap at several concerts held in Davenport and Des Moines, as well as the Buckinghams and Strawberry Alarm Clock. In 1969, they won the Iowa State Fair Teen Town Battle of the Bands. The Daybreakers included a lot of original material in their live act, most penned by Collins, Bridges, Maxwell, and Peters. The Daybreakers' deal with Buddy Killen and Atlantic Records led to no further releases. Demo tapes recorded at Fredlo Records in Davenport failed to get attention, while phone calls to Nashville went unreturned. Chuck Bunn departed and was replaced by Bruce Peters on bass, and subsequently Terry Beckey, then later Paul Thomas. Peters and Thomas also played guitar.

In the early 1970s, the Daybreakers evolved into the group Rox. They remained under the leadership of Collins, but with Bruce Peters came to dominate musically as they moved in a more pop direction, suggestive of the late 1960s Beach Boys and early Raspberries. In the mid-1970s, Collins, Peters and Thomas reunited with Crusin', one of the first 1960s revival bands, which played with varying members, including Bunn and Maxwell, but always with Collins. Collins also became a writer for the Dick Tracy comic book series. Paul Thomas continued to play music until he died in 2004. Peters and Beckey are also deceased. The Daybreakers reunited with their original lineup on Aug. 30, 2008, in Arnolds Park, Iowa, for their induction into the Iowa Rock & Roll Hall of Fame.

Garage rock music fans rediscovered the group in the early 1980s with the release of the Psychedelic Unknowns compilation. Their song "Psychedelic Siren" also appears on Garage Beat '66, Volume 6: Speak of the Devil..., issued by Sundazed Music.

== Membership ==
- Max Allan Collins (keyboards and vocals)
- Mike Bridges (lead guitar)
- Denny Maxwell (rhythm guitar)
- Buddy Busch (drums)
- Terry Beckey (bass, guitar)
- Paul Thomas (bass, guitar, vocals)
- Bruce Peters (guitar, vocals, writer)

== Discography ==
- "Psychedelic Siren" b/w "Afterthoughts" (Dial 4006, December 1967)

== Bibliography ==
- Markesich, Mike (2012). Teenbeat Mayhem (1st ed.). Branford, Connecticut: Priceless Info Press. ISBN 978-0-985-64825-1.
