= I Want To (Do Everything for You) =

Single by Joe Tex

from the album New Boss
- B-side: "Funny Bone"
- Released: July 22, 1965
- Recorded: 1965
- Genre: R&B
- Length: 2:07
- Label: Dial
- Songwriter: Joe Tex

Joe Tex singles chronology
"One Monkey Don't Stop No Show" (1965)	"I Want To (Do Everything for You)" (1965)	"A Sweet Woman Like You" (1965)

"I Want To (Do Everything for You)" is a 1965 R&B hit written and performed by Joe Tex. The single was his second number one on the R&B chart in the U.S., where it stayed for three weeks. "I Want To (Do Everything for You)" was also Joe Tex's second Top 40 entry on the Billboard Hot 100.

== Other Versions ==
The song has been covered by other artists, among them:

- Huey Lewis and the News
- Nazareth

== Chart positions ==
Chart (1965)	Peak position
U.S. Billboard Hot 100	23
U.S. Billboard Hot R&B Singles	1

== See also ==
- List of number-one R&B singles of 1965 (U.S.)
