= George Kent Ltd =

British manufacturing company

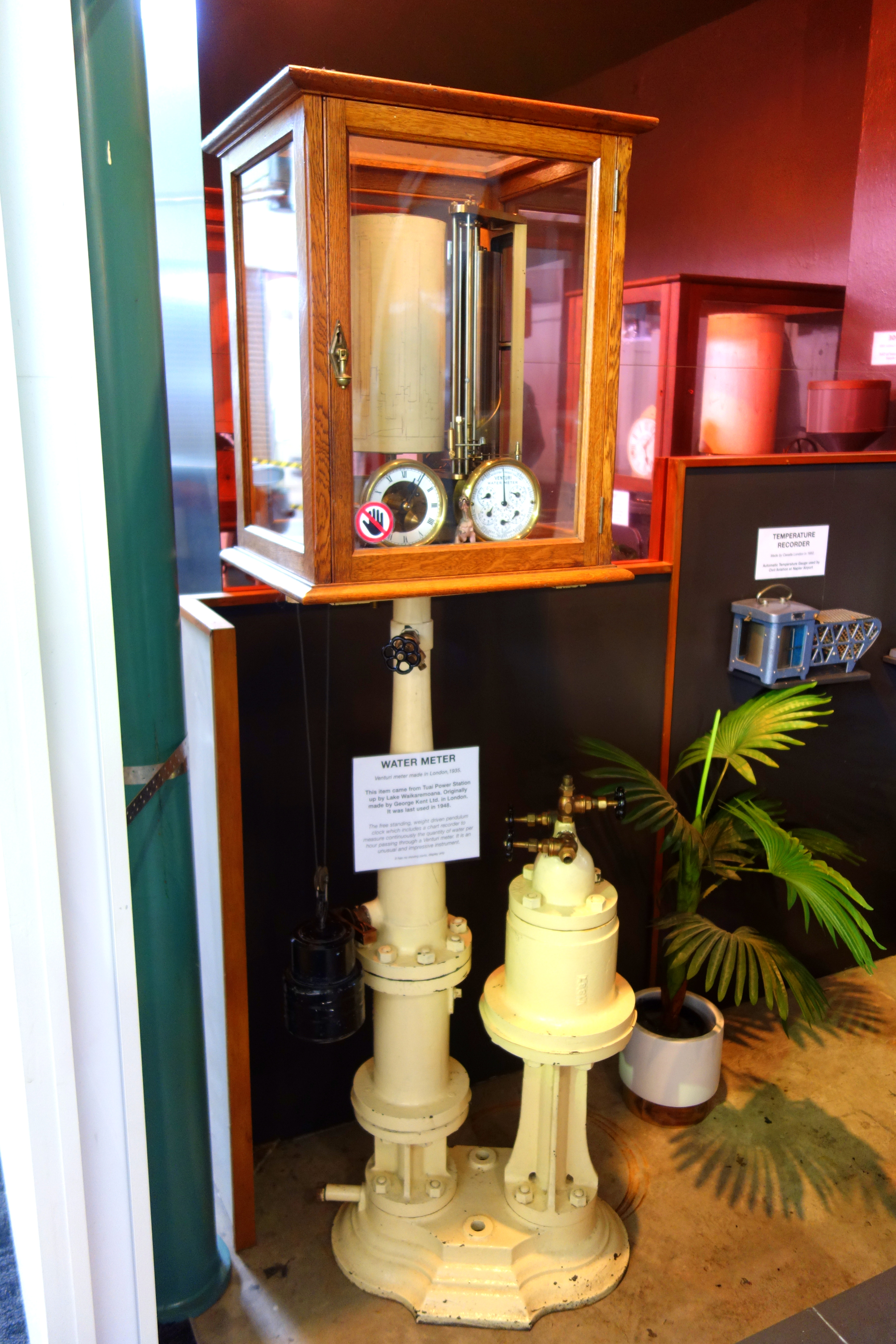
- Venturi Water Meter, made by George Kent Ltd, London, 1935
- Company type: Private
- Industry: Instrumentation, Military, Domestic appliances
- Founded: 1838; 188 years ago
- Successor: Brown Boveri Kent in 1974
- Headquarters: London, United Kingdom
- Number of locations: Luton, St Neots
- Key people: Walter George Kent
- Products: Artillery fuses, linear actuators, flow meters, ice boxes, clear view screens

Founded in 1838, George Kent Ltd was initially a manufacturer of household gadgets, then a manufacturer of munitions during World War One, and became the largest British manufacturer of instruments for industrial control systems, prior to its acquisition by Brown Boveri in 1974.

== Corporate history ==
The company was founded in 1838.

The company was incorporated as a limited company in 1907, and was managed by the founder's son Walter George Kent.

=== World War One ===
During World War One, Kents had a factory in Luton with over 3,000 workers, mostly munitionettes, in this case producing fuses for artillery shells. They were producing 140,000 shell fuses a week. After the war, this grew to 5,000 workers.

=== International growth ===
George Kent grew to have significant reach worldwide, including establishing a subsidiary in Malaysia in 1936. Currently, as an independent organisation, the Malaysian company George Kent provide engineering and metering solutions in South-East Asia, with a diverse set of activities including the integration of railways and the manufacture of water meters.

=== Acquisitions and George Kent Group ===
In 1968, George Kent Ltd acquired Fielden Electronics and Cambridge Scientific Instruments forming the George Kent Group. This was the UK's largest industrial instrument manufacturer. Tony Benn as Minister of Technology answered questions about the backing the British Government had given George Kent in the Cambridge Scientific Instruments takeover in Parliament. The support gave the Government a 24% interest in the company. The Rank Organisation, a rival bidder for Cambridge Scientific Instruments, also acquired an almost 18% interest in the company at the time.

=== Fielden Electronics ===
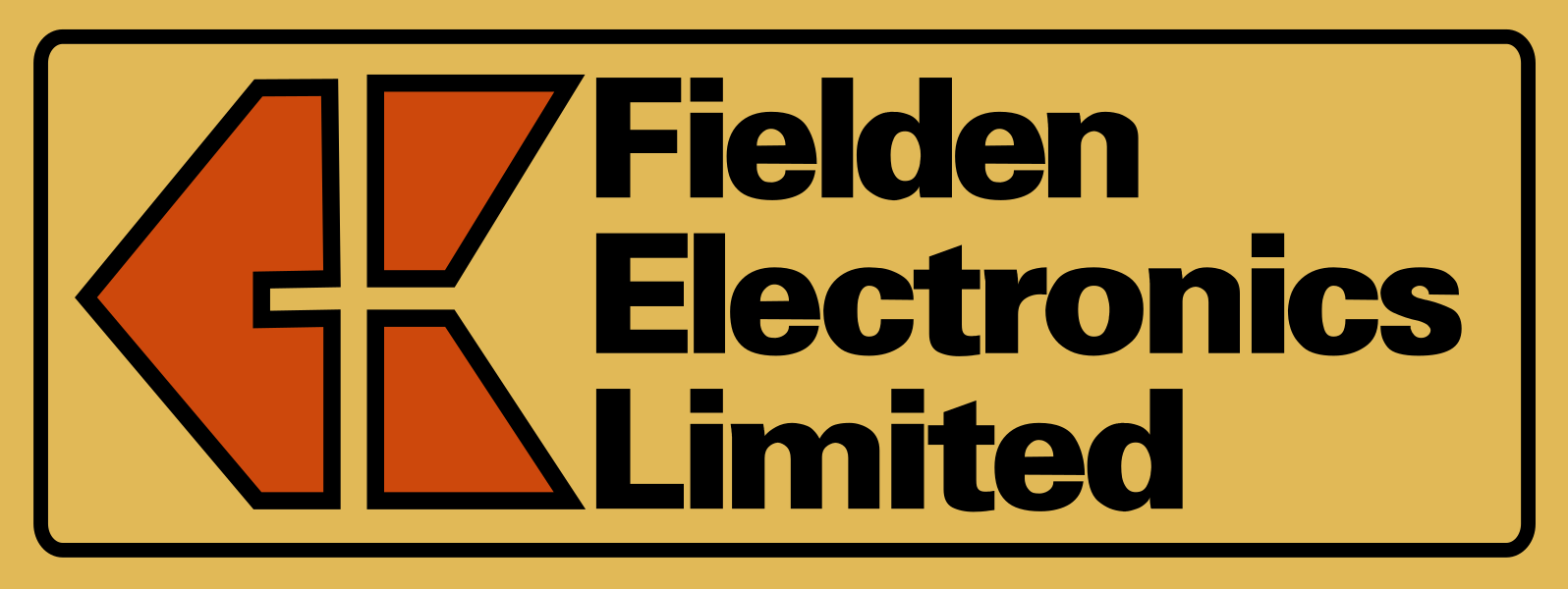
Fielden logo following acquisition by George Kent group

Fielden Electronics of Wythenshawe, Manchester produced a data recorder known as the Servograph and a capacitance-sensing proximity meter alongside a variety of scientific instruments and process control devices. These included the bikini temperature controller, a temperature recorder, and the E296 level controller.

=== Acquisition by Brown Boveri ===
An acquisition in 1974 of George Kent Group by Swiss instrument company Brown Boveri caused a rename to Brown Boveri Kent. At the same time, the company Scientific and Medical Instruments was spun-out which eventually became Cambridge Instrument Company, resurrecting that brand. Brown Boveri eventually merged with ASEA and is today the industrial giant ABB. Kent is maintained as a brand within ABB.

== Notable products ==
=== Domestic equipment ===
Kent's breakthrough product was a knife sharpener, first available around 1850. Later products included an ice cabinet, being a well-insulated damp-proof box suitable for storing meat and dairy products; a miniaturised one appeared in Queen Mary's Dolls' House.

=== Industrial instrumentation ===
Early Kent industrial products include water flow meters. The company motto was "From drops to rivers".

Power cylinders were first manufactured in the 1950s in Luton. These are a type of linear actuator featuring a control loop where the position of the actuator is governed by some input pressure signal. Power cylinders continue to be manufactured, alongside similar linear actuators featuring digital control technology.

=== Other items ===
Kent's produced the clear view screen, a spinning transparent panel that provided visibility in wet weather. Kent also produced avionic equipment, including aircraft fuel gauges and fuel flow meters.
