= Daybreaker =

Daybreaker may refer to:

== Music ==
- Daybreaker (Beth Orton album), 2002, or the title song
- Daybreaker (Architects album), 2012
- Daybreaker (Electric Light Orchestra song), a B-side to the single "Ma-Ma-Ma Belle" from the 1973 album On the Third Day
- Daybreaker (Moon Taxi album), 2015

== Film and television ==
- Daybreakers, 2009 film
- Day Breaker, a crime drama starring Song Yi (actress)
- Persona 5: The Animation – The Day Breakers

=== Fictional characters ===
- Daybreaker, the evil alter-ego of Princess Celestia from My Little Pony: Friendship Is Magic

== See also ==
- Daybreak (disambiguation)
