= Clear view screen =

Spinning window to disperse rain/spray/snow

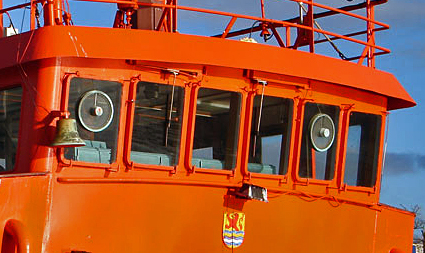
Two clear view screens on the navigation bridge of a tugboat

A clear view screen or clearview screen is a glass disk mounted in a window that rotates to disperse rain, spray, and snow. A clear view screen is typically driven by an electric motor at the center of the disk, and is often heated to prevent condensation or icing. Other common names for it include "clear sight", "spin window", "Kent Screen" and "rotating windshield wiper".

Clear view screens were patented in 1917 by Samuel Augustine de Normanville and Leslie Harcourt Kent as a stand-alone pillar-mounted screen, with later patents for telescope and optics covers, followed by the more familiar ships bridge glass. Clear view screens are also used in locomotives and rail transport, and were unsuccessfully marketed for automobiles. They were initially manufactured by George Kent Ltd, a firm began by Leslie Kent's grandfather, and of which Leslie Kent later was a director. The technology was then acquired by BAE Marine Works to produce clear view screens for military applications. BAE Marine Works was sold to Cornell-Carr Company in 2012.

Identical rotating view ports are used in machine tools with flood coolant. This allows observers to view work through windows which would otherwise be obscured by coolant spray inside the enclosure. Manufacturers such as Rotoclear compete with analogs of Rainex such as Insight KB.

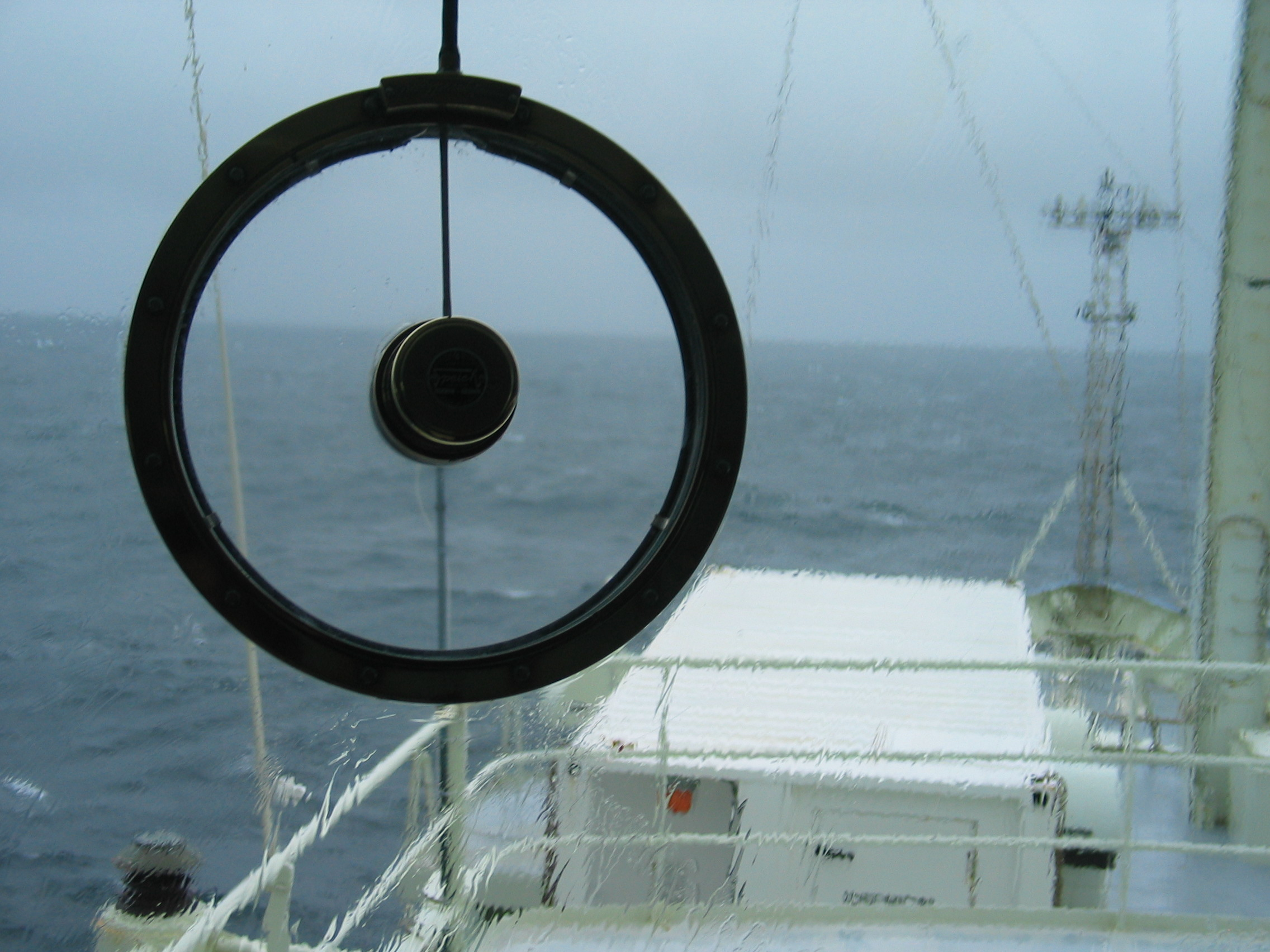
Detail image from inside of a clear view screen on R/V Knorr

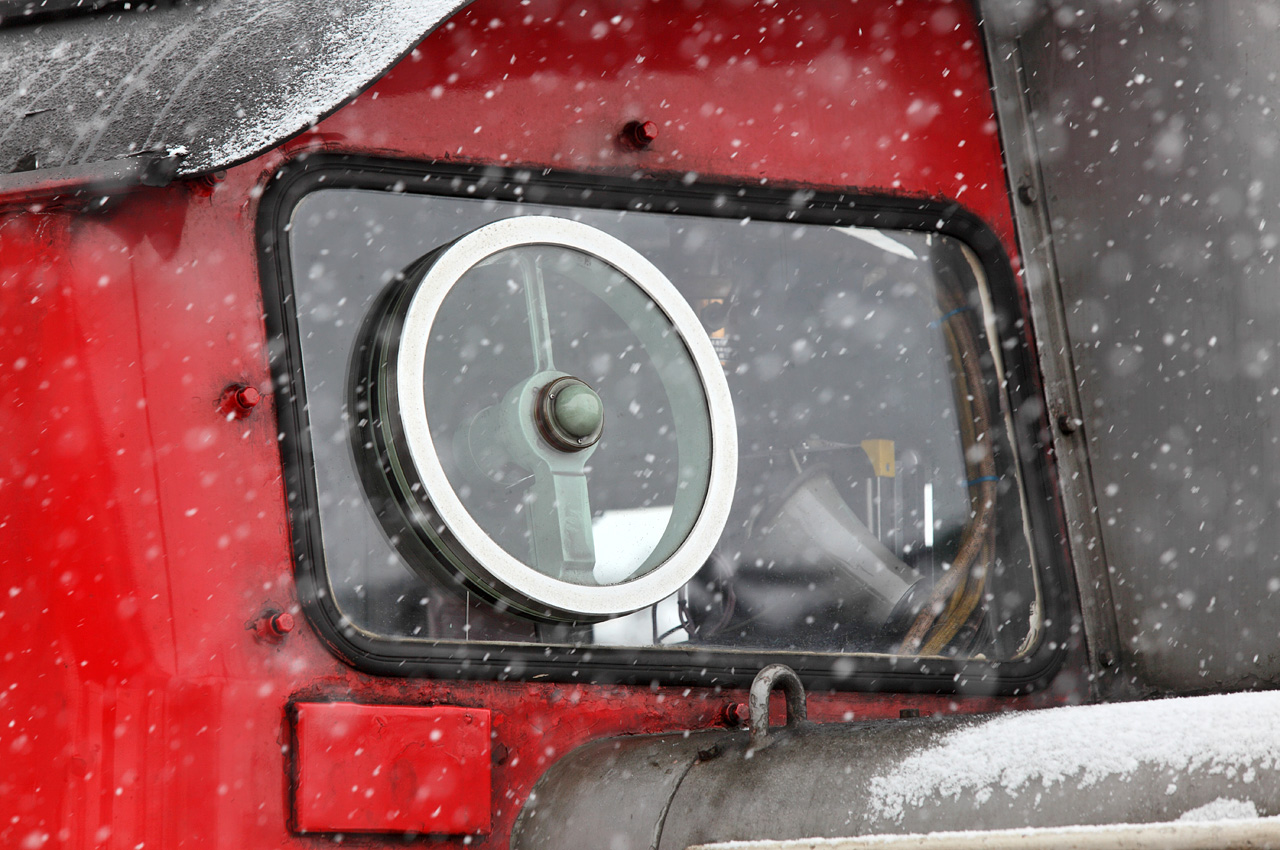
A clear view screen of the Type DD51 diesel locomotive in Hokkaidō, Japan

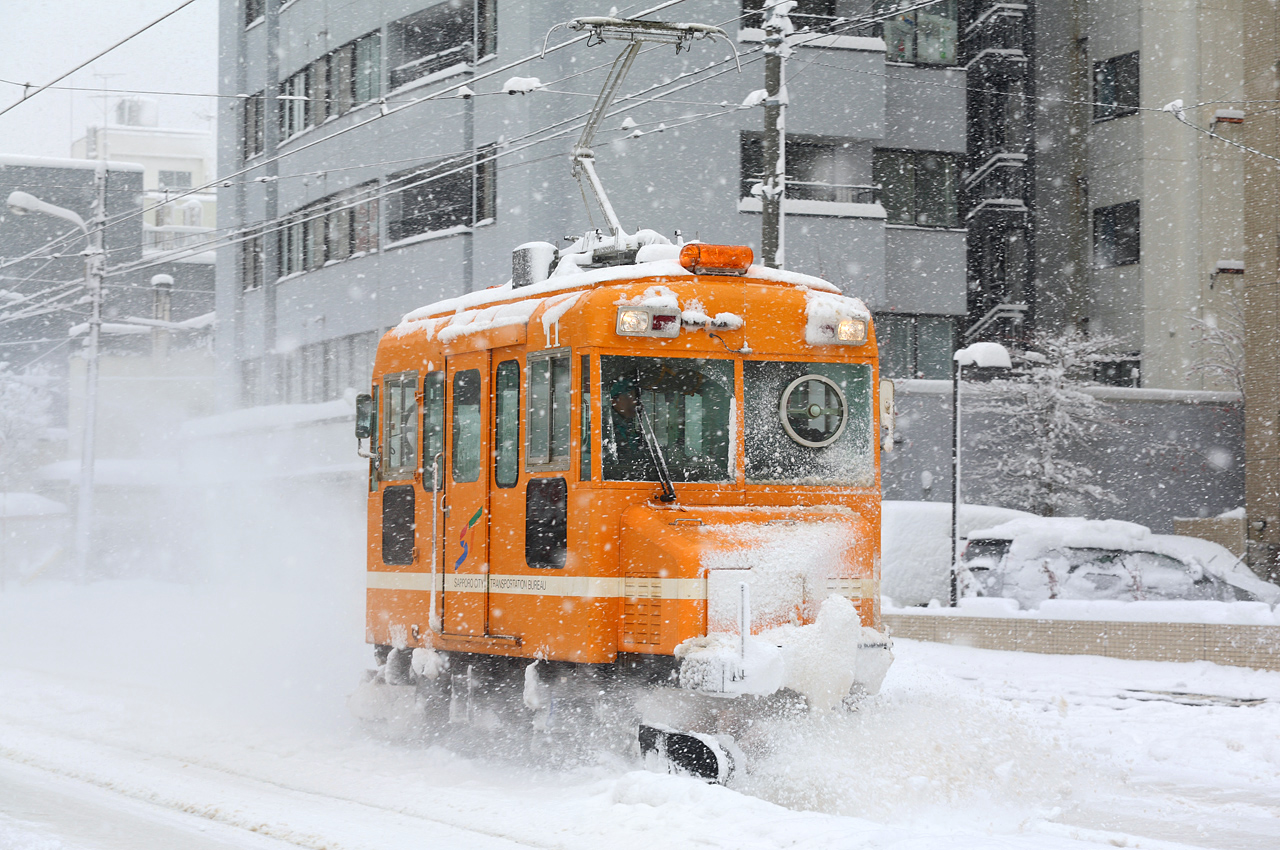
Sasara Trams of Sapporo Streetcar are equipped with clear view screens
