= Ain't Gonna Bump No More (With No Big Fat Woman) =

Single by Joe Tex

from the album Bumps & Bruises
- B-side: "I Mess Up Everything I Get My Hands On"
- Released: December 1976
- Recorded: 1976
- Studio: Sound Shop (Nashville, Tennessee)
- Genre: Funk; disco; R&B; comedy
- Length: 3:30 (single version); 6:34 (full version)
- Label: Tree Productions, Epic
- Songwriters: Bennie Lee McGinty (Joe Tex), Buddy Killen
- Producer: Buddy Killen

Joe Tex singles chronology
"Have You Ever" (1976)	"Ain't Gonna Bump No More (With No Big Fat Woman)" (1976)	"Hungry for Your Love" (1977)

"Ain't Gonna Bump No More (With No Big Fat Woman)" is a song composed by Joe Tex and Buddy Killen, and released by Tex as a single in December 1976, bringing the musician back to the top 40 of the US pop and R&B charts simultaneously for the first time since 1972's "I Gotcha". Tex used his aunt Bennie Lee McGinty's name as composer for tax reasons.

== Reception ==
Tex's previous hit, "Have You Ever", was a hit in New Zealand. In the US, "Ain't Gonna Bump No More" was received well upon its release, reaching number 12 on the Billboard Hot 100 and number 7 on the Billboard R&B chart. Overseas, it was also a success in Europe, reaching number 2 on the UK Singles Chart and number 3 in Ireland.

Tex was later nominated for a Grammy Award for the song and performed it at the ceremony in 1978. The song was later included on the album Bumps & Bruises, without the parenthetical part of the title of the single. It was Tex's final hit before his death in 1982.

== Charts ==
=== Weekly charts ===
Chart (1977)	Peak position
Australia (Kent Music Report)	2
Belgium (Ultratop 50 Flanders)	12
Belgium (Ultratop 50 Wallonia)	29
Canada Top Singles (RPM)	13
Netherlands (Dutch Top 40)	6
Netherlands (Single Top 100)	5
Ireland (IRMA)	3
Sweden (Sverigetopplistan)	18
UK Singles (Official Charts)	2
US Billboard Hot 100	12
US Hot Soul Singles (Billboard)	7
West Germany (GfK)	25

=== Year-end charts ===
Chart (1977)	Position
Australia (Kent Music Report)	22
Belgium (Ultratop Flanders)	98
Canada Top Singles (RPM)	124
Netherlands (Dutch Top 40)	48
Netherlands (Single Top 100)	55
UK Single (OCC)	32
US (Joel Whitburn's Pop Annual)	97

== Personnel ==
Credits taken from the liner notes of the LP Bumps & Bruises.

- Joe Tex: singer, composer
- Buddy Killen: producer
- Ernie Winfrey: recording engineer
- Lea Jane Berinati, Janie Fricke, Yvonne Hodges, Ginger Holladay: background vocals
