= A Sweet Woman Like You =

Single by Joe Tex

from the album The Love You Save
- B-side: "Close the Door"
- Released: November 20, 1965
- Genre: R&B
- Length: 2:30
- Label: Dial
- Songwriter: Joe Tex
- Producer: Buddy Killen

Joe Tex singles chronology
"I Want To (Do Everything for You)" (1965)	"A Sweet Woman Like You" (1965)	"The Love You Save (May Be Your Own)" (1966)

"A Sweet Woman Like You" is a 1965 single written and performed by Joe Tex. The single is the follow-up to his crossover hit, "I Want To (Do Everything for You)". Like its predecessor, "A Sweet Woman Like You" made the Top 40 and hit number-one on the R&B singles chart, becoming Joe Tex's third release to hit the top spot.

== Song ==
"A Sweet Woman Like You" was exemplary Southern soul with its rough-hewn rhythm track and imploring horns.

== Chart positions ==
Chart (1966)	Peak position
U.S. Billboard Hot 100	29
U.S. Billboard Hot R&B Singles	1
