= Hold What You've Got =

Single by Joe Tex

from the album Hold On To What You've Got
- B-side: "Fresh Out of Tears"
- Released: Dec. 1964
- Recorded: 1964
- Genre: Southern soul; R&B
- Length: 3:04
- Label: Dial
- Songwriter: Joe Tex

Joe Tex singles chronology
"I'd Rather Have You" (1964)	"Hold What You've Got" (1964)	"You Got What It Takes" (1965)

"Hold What You've Got" is a 1964 single by Joe Tex. The single was his second chart release and first to reach the Billboard Hot 100. "Hold What You've Got" went to number one on the Cash Box R&B chart, and reached number five in 1965, on the pop chart.

== Background ==
The song is noted for the two spoken recitations, between the refrains of the song, telling first the men and then the women to keep on supporting their loved ones and not take them for granted.

Tex exhorts men that a "good woman" - someone he can call his own and minds their children and cooks his dinner before he comes home - is rare. But when a man takes a woman like that for granted, he warns, and throws her away, she can be snapped up "before you can count one, two, three."

For women, Tex says the value of a good man is one who stands by her, brings home his pay from work and gives her all her heart desires. But if she goes out to play and neglects to take care of her man, other women will step up to take care of him.
