= Joe Tex =

American singer and musician (1935–1982)

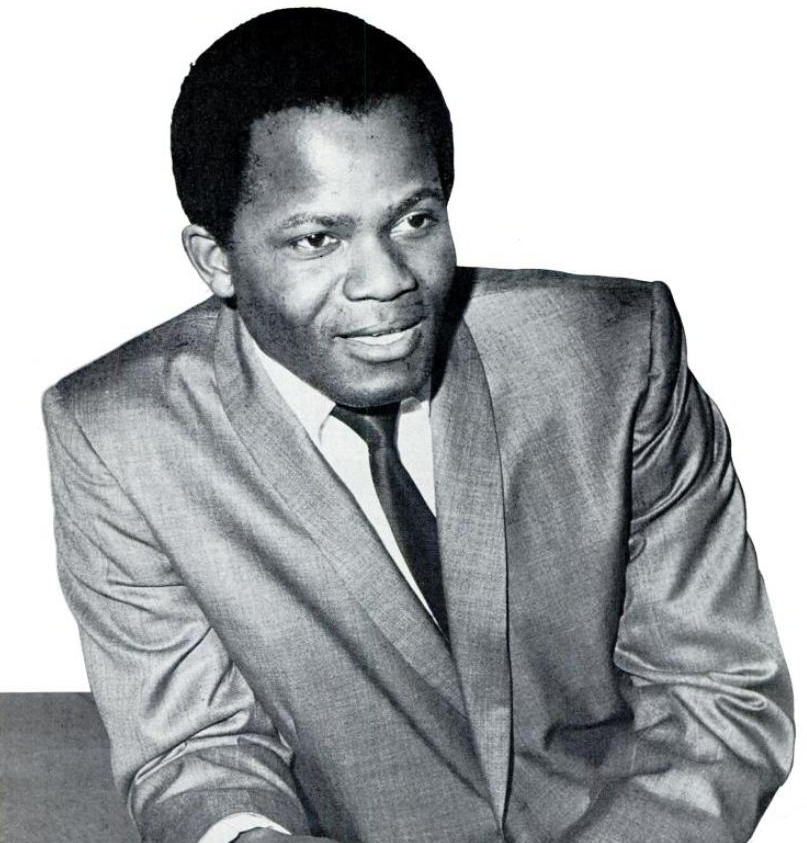
- Tex in 1965

Background information
- Also known as: Yusuf Hazziez
- Born: Joseph Arrington Jr. August 8, 1935; Rogers, Texas, U.S.
- Origin: Baytown, Texas, U.S.
- Died: August 13, 1982 (aged 47) Navasota, Texas, U.S.
- Genres: R&B; soul; southern soul; deep soul; funk; disco
- Occupation: Singer-songwriter
- Instruments: Vocals, guitar
- Years active: 1955–1982
- Labels: King; Ace; Anna; Dial; Atlantic; Mercury; Epic

Yusuf Hazziez (born Joseph Arrington Jr.; August 8, 1935 – August 13, 1982), known professionally as Joe Tex, was an American singer and musician who gained success in the 1960s and 1970s with his brand of Southern soul, which mixed the styles of funk, country, gospel, and rhythm and blues.

His career started after he was signed to King Records in 1955 following four wins at the Apollo Theater. Between 1955 and 1964, he struggled to find hits, and by the time he finally recorded his first hit, "Hold What You've Got" in 1964, he had recorded 30 previous singles that were deemed failures on the charts. He went on to have four million-selling hits: "Hold What You've Got" (1965), "Skinny Legs and All" (1967), "I Gotcha" (1972), and "Ain't Gonna Bump No More (With No Big Fat Woman)" (1977).

Tex was nominated for the Rock & Roll Hall of Fame six times, most recently in 2017.

== Early life ==
Joe Tex was born Joseph Arrington, Jr. in Rogers, Texas, in Bell County to Joseph Arrington and Cherie Sue (Jackson) Arrington. He and his sister Mary Sue were initially raised by their grandmother, Mary Richardson. After their parents divorced, Cheri Arrington moved to Baytown. Tex played baritone saxophone in the high-school band and sang in a local Pentecostal church choir. He entered several talent shows, and after an important win in Houston, he won $300 and a trip to New York City. Joe Tex took part in the amateur portion of the Apollo Theater, winning first place four times, which led to his discovery by Henry Glover, who offered him a contract with King Records. His mother's wish was that he graduate from high school first, and Glover agreed to wait a year before signing him at age 19.

== Music career ==
=== Early recordings ===
Tex recorded for King Records between 1955 and 1957 with little success. He later claimed he sold musical rights to the composition "Fever" to King Records staff to get money to pay his rent. The song's credited songwriters, Otis Blackwell (who used the pseudonym John Davenport) and Joe Cooley, disputed Tex's claims. Labelmate Little Willie John had a hit with "Fever", which inspired Tex to write the first of his answer songs, "Pneumonia".

In 1958, he signed with Ace and continued to have relative failures, but he was starting to build a unique stage reputation, opening for artists such as Jackie Wilson, James Brown, and Little Richard. He perfected the microphone tricks and dance moves that defined the rest of his career. Many, including Little Richard, claim that Tex's future nemesis James Brown stole Tex's dance moves and microphone tricks. In 1960, he left Ace and briefly recorded for Detroit's Anna Records label, scoring a Bubbling Under Billboard hit with his cover version of Etta James' "All I Could Do Was Cry". By then, Tex's use of rapping over his music was starting to become commonplace.

In 1961, he recorded his composition "Baby You're Right" for Anna. Later that year, James Brown recorded a cover version, though with different lyrics and a different musical composition, gaining songwriting credit, making it a hit in 1962, and reaching number two on the R&B chart. During this time, Tex first began working with Buddy Killen, who formed the Dial Records label behind Tex. After a number of songs failed to chart, Killen decided to have Atlantic Records distribute his recordings with Dial in 1964. By the time he signed with Atlantic, Tex had recorded 30 songs, all of which had failed to make an impact on the charts.

=== Success ===
Tex recorded and finally scored his first hit, "Hold What You've Got", in November 1964 at FAME Studios in Muscle Shoals, Alabama. He was unconvinced the song would be a hit and advised Killen not to release it. However, Killen felt otherwise and released the song in early 1965. By the time Tex got wind of its release, the song had already sold 200,000 copies. The song eventually peaked at number five on the Billboard Hot 100 and became Tex's first number-one hit on the R&B charts, staying on the charts for 11 weeks and selling more than a million copies by 1966.

Tex placed six top-40 charted singles on the R&B charts in 1965 alone, including two more number-one hits, "I Want To (Do Everything For You)" and "A Sweet Woman Like You". He followed that with two successive albums, Hold On To What You've Got and The New Boss. He placed more R&B hits than any artist, including his rival James Brown. In 1966, five more singles entered the top 40 on the R&B charts, including "The Love You Save" and "S.Y.S.L.J.F.M." or "The Letter Song", which was an answer song to Wilson Pickett's "634-5789 (Soulsville, U.S.A.)".

His 1967 hits included "Show Me", which became an often-covered tune for British rock artists and later some country and pop artists, and his second million-selling hit, "Skinny Legs and All". The latter song, released off Tex's pseudo-live album, Live and Lively, stayed on the charts for 15 weeks and was awarded a gold disc by the Recording Industry Association of America (RIAA) in January 1968. After leaving Atlantic for Mercury, Tex had several more R&B hits including "Buying a Book" in 1970 and "Give the Baby Anything the Baby Wants" in 1971. The intro saxophone riffs in his 1969 song, "You're Right, Ray Charles" later influenced Funkadelic's "Standing on the Verge of Gettin' It On".

"Tex is a novelty artist whose subject is morality ... all over some very punchy dance tracks by James Brown out of Stax-Volt."

— Christgau's Record Guide: Rock Albums of the Seventies (1981)

Tex recorded his next big hit, "I Gotcha", in December 1971. The song was released in January 1972 and stayed on the charts for 20 weeks, staying at number two on the Hot 100 for two weeks and sold more than 2 million copies, becoming his biggest-selling hit to date. Tex was offered a gold disc of the song on March 22, 1972. The parent album reached number 17 on the pop albums chart. The song would later be included in director Quentin Tarantino's 1992 film debut Reservoir Dogs. Following this and another album, Tex announced his retirement from show business in September 1972 to pursue life as a minister for Islam. Tex returned to his music career following the death of Elijah Muhammad in 1975, releasing the top-40 R&B hit, "Under Your Powerful Love". His last hit, "Ain't Gonna Bump No More (With No Big Fat Woman)", was released in 1977 and peaked at number 12 on the Hot 100 and number 2 in the UK.

His last public appearances were as part of a revised 1980s version of the Soul Clan in 1981. After that, Tex withdrew from public life, settling at his ranch in Navasota, Texas, and watching football games by his favorite team, the Houston Oilers.

=== Rivalry with James Brown ===
The feud between Tex and fellow label mate James Brown allegedly originated sometime in the mid-1950s, when both artists were signed to associated imprints of King Records, when Brown reportedly called out on Tex for a "battle" during a dance at a local juke joint. In 1960, Tex left King and recorded a few songs for Detroit-based Anna Records; one of the songs he recorded was the ballad "Baby, You're Right". A year later, Brown recorded the song and released it in 1961, changing the lyrics and the musical composition, earning Brown co-songwriting credits along with Tex. By then, Brown had recruited singer Bea Ford, who had been married to Tex but had divorced him in 1959. In 1960, Brown and Ford recorded the song, "You've Got the Power". Shortly afterward, Tex got a personal letter from Brown telling him that he was through with Ford and if Tex wanted her back, he could have her. Tex responded by recording the diss record "You Keep Her" in 1962.

In 1963, their feud escalated when Tex and Brown performed a concert in Macon, Georgia. Tex, who opened the show, imitated Brown by appearing in a torn, tattered cape and rolling around on the floor screaming, "Please—somebody help get me out of this cape!" Brown, already angry with Tex over the song "You Keep Her", left the club and returned with guns. Tex had left the club before the shooting commenced. The incident led to multiple people being shot and stabbed. Since Brown was still on parole at the time, he relied on his agent Clint Brantley "and a few thousand dollars to make the situation disappear". According to fellow performer Johnny Jenkins, "seven people got shot", and after the shootout ended, a man appeared and gave "each one of the injured a hundred dollars apiece not to carry it no further and not to talk to the press". Brown was never charged for the incident. Tex later claimed that Brown stole his dance moves and his microphone stand tricks.

In a few interviews he gave in the 1960s, Tex dismissed the notion of Brown being called "Soul Brother No. 1", insisting that Little Willie John was the original "Soul Brother No. 1". Tex even claimed Brown stopped some radio disc jockeys from playing his hit "Skinny Legs and All", which Tex claimed prevented Tex from taking down one of Brown's number-one songs at the time. During a 1968 tour, Tex had the words "The New Soul Brother No. 1" on his tour bus, but eventually took the name off the bus and had it repainted. Tex challenged Brown to contest who "the real soul brother" was. Brown reportedly refused the challenge, telling the Afro-American, "I will not fight a black man. You need too much help." While Tex moved on from his initial feud with Brown, Brown reportedly joked, "Who?" in his Bobby Byrd and Hank Ballard duet "Funky Side of Town" from his Get on the Good Foot album when Ballard mentioned Tex's name as one of the stars of soul music.

== Personal life and death ==
A convert to the Nation of Islam in 1966, he changed his name to Yusuf Hazziez, and toured as a spiritual lecturer. He had two daughters, Eartha Doucet and Leslie Arrington, and four sons, Joseph Arrington III, Ramadan Hazziez, Jwaade Hazziez, and Joseph Hazziez.

Though he lived most of his life free of drugs and alcohol, according to his longtime producer Buddy Killen, Tex suffered from addiction during the last four years of his life. In his final performances as part of the Soul Clan, he appeared gaunt and unwell, and Killen claimed that Tex had "lost his will to live".

In early August 1982, Tex was found at the bottom of a swimming pool at his home in Navasota, after which he was revived in hospital and sent home. Just a few days later, on August 13, five days after his 47th birthday, he died at Grimes Memorial Hospital in Navasota, following a heart attack.

== Cover versions ==
Several other artists have covered Tex's work. Jimmy Barnes had a top ten Australian hit with "I Gotcha" from his 1991 album Soul Deep, which also featured a version of "Show Me". The Foundations also covered "Show Me". US R&B group the Raelettes and UK hard rock band Nazareth covered "I Want To (Do Everything for You)", and Phish performed "You Better Believe It Baby".

== Selected discography ==
=== Chart albums ===
Year	Album	Chart positions		Label
Year	Album	US Pop	US R&B	Label
1965	Hold What You've Got	124	2	Dial Records 8106
1965	The New Boss	142	3	Dial/Atlantic 8115
1966	The Love You Save	108	3	Dial/Atlantic 8124
1967	The Best of Joe Tex	168	23	Dial/Atlantic 8144
1967	I've Got to Do a Little Better	—	24	Dial/Atlantic 8133
1968	Live and Lively	84	13	Dial/Atlantic 8156
1968	Soul Country	154	45	Dial/Atlantic 8187
1969	Buying a Book	190	—	Dial/Atlantic 8231
1972	I Gotcha	17	5	Dial 6002
1973	Spill the Beans	—	42	Dial 6004
1977	Bumps & Bruises	108	32	Epic 34666
"—" denotes releases that did not chart.

=== Chart singles ===
Year	Single	Chart positions				Certifications
Year	Single	US Pop	US R&B	AUS	UK	Certifications
1960	"All I Could Do Was Cry"	102	—	—	—	
1964	"I'd Rather Have You"	—	44	—	—	
1964	"Hold What You've Got"	5	1	—	—	
1965	"You Got What It Takes" / "You Better Get It"	51; 46	10; 15	—	—	
1965	"A Woman Can Change a Man"	56	12	—	—	
1965	"Don't Let Your Left Hand Know"	95	—	—	—	
1965	"One Monkey Don't Stop No Show"	65	20	—	—	
1965	"I Want To (Do Everything for You)"	23	1	—	—	
1965	"A Sweet Woman Like You"	29	1	—	—	
1966	"The Love You Save (May Be Your Own)"	56	2	—	—	
1966	"S.Y.S.L.J.F.M. (The Letter Song)"	39	9	—	—	
1966	"I Believe I'm Gonna Make It"	67	8	—	—	
1966	"I've Got to Do a Little Bit Better"	64	20	—	—	
1966	"Papa Was Too"	44	15	—	—	
1967	"Show Me"	35	24	—	—	
1967	"Woman Like That, Yeah"	54	24	—	—	
1967	"A Woman's Hands"	63	24	—	—	
1967	"Skinny Legs and All"	10	2	—	—	
1968	"Men Are Gettin' Scarce"	33	7	—	—	
1968	"I'll Never Do You Wrong"	59	26	—	—	
1968	"Keep the One You Got"	52	13	—	—	
1968	"You Need Me, Baby"	81	29	—	—	
1969	"That's Your Baby"	88	—	—	—	
1969	"Buying a Book"	47	10	—	—	
1969	"That's the Way"	94	46	—	—	
1969	"It Ain't Sanitary"	117	—	—	—	
1969	"I Can't See You No More"	105	—	—	—	
1971	"Give the Baby Anything the Baby Wants"	102	20	—	—	
1972	"I Gotcha" / "A Mother's Prayer"	2 —	1; 41	—	— —	
1972	"You Said a Bad Word"	41	12	—	—	
1973	"Woman Stealer"	103	41	—	—	
1975	"Under Your Powerful Love"	—	27	—	—	
1976	"Have You Ever"	—	74	—	—	
1977	"Ain't Gonna Bump No More (With No Big Fat Woman)"	12	7	2	2	BPI: Silver
1977	"Hungry for Your Love"	—	84	—	—	
1978	"Rub Down"	—	70	—	—	
1978	"Loose Caboose"	—	48	—	—	
"—" denotes releases that did not chart or were not released in that territory.

== See also ==
- Blues
- Southern soul
- Atlantic Records
