= Dial Records (1960s American record label) =

Dial Records was an American record label founded in Nashville, Tennessee, in 1961 by Buddy Killen. The label specialized in soul music and rhythm and blues, and is best known as the longtime recording home of Joe Tex. Although initially distributed on a regional basis, Dial achieved national success through distribution agreements with London Records, Atlantic Records, and later Mercury Records. The label became inactive during the mid-1970s before a brief revival in partnership with T.K. Records in 1978. Killen closed Dial permanently in 1979.

== History ==
Buddy Killen established Dial Records in 1961 primarily to issue recordings by Joe Tex, whose earlier releases had failed to achieve sustained commercial success. Dial's first releases consisted of two Tex singles, and throughout the decade he remained the label's flagship artist. The label gained national attention in 1964 when Tex's "Hold What You've Got" reached the Billboard R&B chart and crossed over to the Billboard Hot 100. During the mid-1960s, Dial expanded its roster to include artists such as Bobby Marchan, Clarence "Blowfly" Reid, George Kent, Clarence "Frogman" Henry, The Allman Joys, The Daybreakers, Chris Harris and the Soul Agents, Frederick Knight, Jean Knight, King Floyd, Paul Kelly, Little Archie, Gunilla Hutton, Wayne Handy, Len Wade and The Tikis,

== Distribution and later years ==
Dial initially relied on independent distribution before entering national distribution agreements with London Records and Atlantic Records during the mid-1960s, whose releases were issued in separate catalog-number series. In 1971, distribution transferred to Mercury Records, which introduced a new catalog sequence for Dial releases. Following Joe Tex's retirement from recording in 1972, the label's output declined considerably. After several years of relative inactivity, Dial was briefly revived in 1978 through a distribution arrangement with T.K. Records, which issued the label's final singles. Killen discontinued the label permanently in 1979, and operated Tree International Publishing, which was ultimately acquired by Sony Music Publishing, the current owner of Dial's catalog.

== See also ==
- List of record labels
- Keith Records
