= Diana Trask discography =

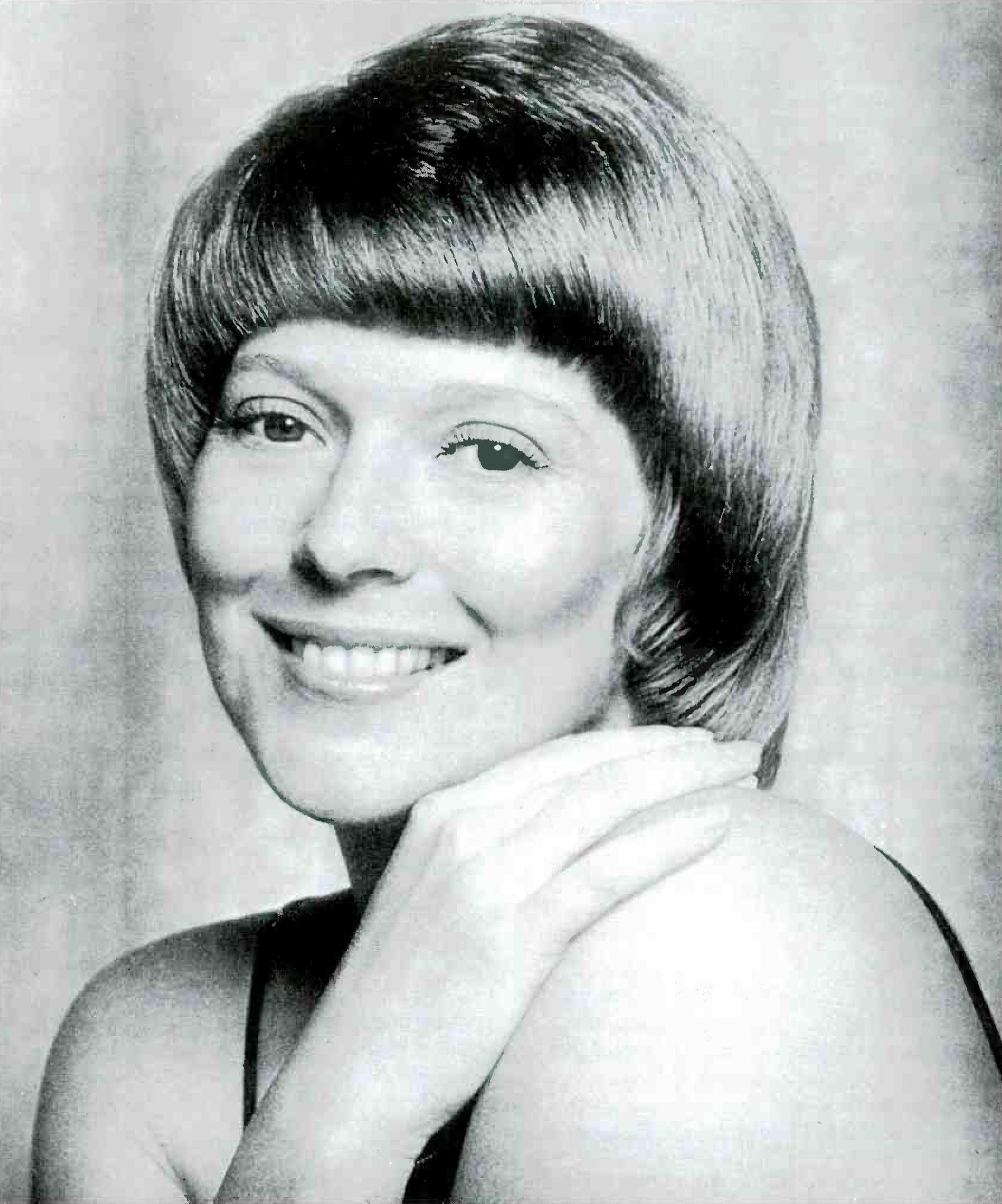
- Diana Trask, 1974.
- Studio albums: 16
- EPs: 1
- Compilation albums: 6
- Singles: 33
- Other charted songs: 1

The discography of Australian singer Diana Trask contains 16 studio albums, six compilation albums, one extended play (EP), 33 singles and one other charting song. The Columbia label issued her first two albums in 1961: Diana Trask on TV and an eponymous studio LP. It was followed in 1965 by the CBS International LP, Just for You. The label also issued several singles, including the songs "A Guy Is a Guy" and "Our Language of Love". Both made the top 60 in Australia in 1961. In the country field, the 1968 single "Lock, Stock and Teardrops" reached the top 70 on the US Hot Country Songs chart. Her version of "I Fall to Pieces" made the US country top 40 in 1969. It was issued on her second studio album with the Dot label called From the Heart (1969). The LP reached number 32 on the US Top Country Albums chart.

The Dot label issued two more studio albums by Trask through 1972: Diana's Country and Diana Trask Sings About Loving. The LP's produced three charting singles including a pair of US top 40 country songs: "It Meant Nothing to Me" and "We've Got to Work It Out Between Us". Her next four singles made the US country songs top 20 between 1973 and 1974: "Say When", "It's a Man's World (If You Had a Man Like Mine)", "When I Get My Hands on You" and "Lean It All on Me". Additionally, "Say When" reached number eight on the RPM country chart in Canada. The songs were included on the studio albums It's a Man's World and Lean It All on Me. Her 1974 single "Oh Boy" rose into the US country top 30, the Canadian country top 20 and number ten on Australia's Kent Music Report chart.

Four more of Trask's singles made the US country songs chart through 1981. The Hammard label issued two studio albums of her material in the 1980s, including 1981's One Day at a Time, which was certified gold by the Australian Recording Industry Association. Both One Day at a Time and its follow-up, Footprints, reached the Australian albums chart in the early 1980s. A collaborative compilation album with Allison Durbin titled Nothing But the Very Best reached the Australian albums top 100 in 1982. It was not until 2010 that Trask released her next studio album titled Country Lovin'. She has since released two more studio albums and an EP since 2017.

== Albums ==
=== Studio albums ===
List of albums, with selected chart positions, showing other relevant details
Title	Album details	Peak chart positions		Certifications
Title	Album details	AUS	US Cou.	Certifications
Diana Trask	Released: March 1961; Label: Columbia; Formats: LP	—	—	
Diana Trask on TV (with Mitch Miller's Sing Along Chorus)	Released: November 1961; Label: Columbia; Formats: LP	—	—	
Just for You	Released: 1965; Label: CBS; Formats: LP	—	—	
Miss Country Soul	Released: February 1969; Label: Dot; Formats: LP	—	34	
From the Heart	Released: September 1969; Label: Dot; Formats: LP	—	32	
Diana's Country	Released: May 1971; Label: Dot; Formats: LP	—	—	
Diana Trask Sings About Loving	Released: July 1972; Label: Dot; Formats: LP	—	—	
It's a Man's World	Released: December 1973; Label: Dot; Formats: LP	—	25	
Lean It All on Me	Released: May 1974; Label: Dot; Formats: LP, cassette	—	34	
The Mood I'm In	Released: June 1975; Label: ABC–Dot; Formats: LP, cassette	65	—	
Believe Me Now or Believe Me Later	Released: May 1976; Label: ABC; Formats: LP	—	—	
One Day at a Time	Released: 1981; Label: Hammard; Formats: LP	50	—	ARIA: Gold
Footprints	Released: 1985; Label: Hammard; Formats: LP	64	—	
Country Lovin'	Released: 2010; Label: Trask; Formats: CD, digital	—	—	
Daughter of Australia	Released: March 21, 2014; Label: Trask; Formats: CD, digital	—	—	
Memories Are Made of This	Released: September 23, 2016; Label: Trask; Formats: CD, digital	—	—	
"—" denotes a single that did not chart or was not released.

=== Compilation albums ===
List of albums, with selected chart positions, showing other relevant details
Title	Album details	Peak chart positions	
Title	Album details	AUS	US Cou.
Diana Trask's Greatest Hits	Released: October 1974; Label: ABC–Dot; Formats: LP	—	32
Diana Trask's Greatest Hits	Released: 1975; Label: Ember; Formats: LP	—	—
The ABC Collection	Released: 1977; Label: ABC; Formats: LP	—	—
Join the Country Club	Released: 1977; Label: ABC Dot/MCA; Formats: LP, cassette	—	—
Nothing But the Very Best (with Allison Durbin)	Released: 1982; Label: Hammard; Formats: LP, cassette	88	—
Country Bumpkin	Released: December 1986; Label: Hammard; Formats: LP, cassette	—	—
"—" denotes a single that did not chart or was not released.

== Extended plays ==
List of EPs, showing all relevant details
Title	Album details
Duets (with Dave Owens)	Released: May 19, 2017; Label: Trask; Formats: Digital

== Singles ==
List of singles, with selected chart positions, showing other relevant details
Title	Year	Peak chart positions				Certifications	Album
Title	Year	AUS	CAN Cou.	US Bub.	US Cou.	Certifications	Album
"Going Steady"	1958	—	—	—	—		—N/a
"Soldier Won't You Marry Me"	1959	54	—	—	—		—N/a
"A Guy Is a Guy"	1960	59	—	—	—		—N/a
"Long Ago Last Summer"	1960	26	—	—	—		—N/a
"Our Language of Love"	1960	48	—	—	—		—N/a
"Waltzing Matilda"	1961	—	—	—	—		Diana Trask on TV
"Too Young"	1964	—	—	—	—		Just for You
"The Road to Gundagai"	1965	—	—	—	—		Just for You
"Lock, Stock and Teardrops"	1968	—	—	—	70		—N/a
"Hold What You've Got"	1968	—	—	—	59		Miss Country Soul
"You Got What It Takes"	1969	—	—	—	—		Miss Country Soul
"Children"	1969	—	—	—	58		From the Heart
"I Fall to Pieces"	1969	—	29	14	37		From the Heart
"Beneath Still Waters"	1970	—	50	—	38		—N/a
"The Last Person to See Me Alive"	1971	—	—	—	—		Diana's Country
"The Chokin' Kind"	1971	—	—	—	59		Diana's Country
"We've Got to Work It Out Between Us"	1972	—	—	—	30		Diana Trask Sings About Loving
"It Meant Nothing to Me"	1972	—	—	—	33		Diana Trask Sings About Loving
"Say When"	1973	—	8	—	15		It's a Man's World
"It's a Man's World (If You Had a Man Like Mine)"	1973	—	22	—	20		It's a Man's World
"When I Get My Hands on You"	1973	—	25	—	16		It's a Man's World
"Lean It All on Me"	1974	—	12	11	13		Lean It All on Me
"(If You Wanna Hold on) Hold to Your Man"	1974	—	—	—	32		Lean It All on Me
"Oh Boy"	1974	10	14	—	21	ARIA: Gold	The Mood I'm In
"There Has to Be a Loser"	1975	—	—	—	82		The Mood I'm In
"Cry"	1975	—	—	—	99		Diana Trask's Greatest Hits
"Let's Get Down to Business"	1976	—	—	—	—		Believe Me Now or Believe Me Later
"Waltzing Matilda"	1977	—	—	—	—		—N/a
"Rising Above It All"	1980	—	—	—	—		—N/a
"Mothers and Daddies"	1980	—	—	—	—		—N/a
"This Must Be My Ship"	1981	—	—	—	62		—N/a
"Stirrin' Up Feelings"	1981	—	—	—	74		—N/a
"Never Gonna Be Alright"	1981	—	—	—	—		—N/a
"—" denotes a single that did not chart or was not released.

== Other charted songs ==
List of singles, with selected chart positions, showing other relevant details
Title	Year	Peak chart positions	Album	Notes
Title	Year	AUS	Album	Notes
"Lover Is Another Name for Fool"	1959	56	—N/a	(Note: Appeared as the B-side to "Soldier Won't You Marry Me".)
