= Diana Trask's Greatest Hits =

Compilation album by Diana Trask
- Released: October 1974
- Genre: Country
- Label: ABC–Dot
- Producer: Norro Wilson; Danny Davis; Buddy Killen

Diana Trask chronology
Lean It All on Me (1974)	Diana Trask's Greatest Hits (1974)	The Mood I'm In (1975)

Singles from Diana Trask's Greatest Hits
- 1. "Cry" Released: November 1975

Diana Trask's Greatest Hits is a compilation album by Australian singer Diana Trask. It was released by the ABC–Dot label in October 1974 and contained 11 previously released songs for Trask. They included some of her most well-known US country music recordings and featured a new single release that made the US country chart called "Cry". The album itself was Trask's final to make the US country albums chart in her career. It received positive reviews following its release.

== Background and content ==
After switching from pop music to country music, Diana Trask found success on the US country charts with a series of top 40 and top 20 country songs during the late sixties and early seventies. Diana Trask's Greatest Hits featured 11 previously recorded tracks, most of which were previously singles for her at Dot Records. The tracks featured original production from Norro Wilson, Danny Davis or Buddy Killen. Among the notable songs were "It's a Man's World (If You Had a Man Like Mine)", "We've Got to Work It Out Between Us" and "Lean It All on Me".

== Release, reception, chart performance and singles ==
Diana Trask's Greatest Hits was originally released by ABC–Dot Records in October 1974 as a vinyl LP featuring six songs on "side 1" and five songs on "side 2". It was Trask's first compilation album. The album cover was taken at the Sands Hotel and Casino in Las Vegas where Trask requested she change the marquis name to the album title. The hotel was then given permission by Trask's label to do so as long as the venue sold her LP's at future events.

It was given a positive review by Cash Box called the album "A bountiful collection of eleven songs comprise Diana's greatest hits. Diana exhibits power, grace, and style here in addition to the vocal abilities which have seen her climb during the past year." While AllMusic did not write a formal review, they did rate the album at four and a half stars. The compilation was Trask's final LP to make the US Billboard Top Country Albums chart, rising to the number 32 position in early 1975. It was one of five albums to make the country chart. The compilation did include one new single release, "Cry" (released in November 1975). It reached number 99 on the US Hot Country Songs chart.

== Track listing ==
Side one
No.	Title	Writer(s)	Length
1.	"Lean It All on Me"	Josh Whitmore	2:50
2.	"It's a Man's World (If You Had a Man Like Mine)"	N. Wilson; C. Taylor; G. Sutton	2:36
3.	"Say When"	D. Bruce; N. Wilson; C. Taylor	2:06
4.	"It Meant Nothing to Me"	Bobby John Henry	2:58
5.	"The Last Person to See Me Alive"	Ira Gasman; Cary Hoffman; Jim Barr	2:59
6.	"When I Get My Hands on You"	N. Wilson; C. Taylor; D. Trask	2:47

Side two
No.	Title	Writer(s)	Length
1.	"(If You Wanna Hold on) Hold on to Your Man"	Diana Trask; Tom Ewen	2:08
2.	"We've Got to Work It Out Between Us"	Ann J. Morton	3:03
3.	"I Fall to Pieces"	Cochran & Howard	3:21
4.	"The Chokin' Kind"	Harland Howard	2:30
5.	"Cry"	C. Kohlman	3:20

== Personnel ==
All credits are adapted from the liner notes of Diana Trask's Greatest Hits.

- The Halsey Company – Management
- Albert Watson – Photography

== Chart performance ==
Chart (1974–1975)	Peak position
US Top Country Albums (Billboard)	32

== Release history ==
Region	Date	Format	Label	Ref.
North America	October 1974	Vinyl LP	ABC–Dot	
United Kingdom	October 1974	Vinyl LP	ABC Records	
