= Believe Me Now or Believe Me Later =

Studio album by Diana Trask
- Released: May 1976
- Studio: Davlen Sound Studios
- Genre: Country
- Label: ABC
- Producer: Joe Porter

Diana Trask chronology
The Mood I'm In (1975)	Believe Me Now or Believe Me Later (1976)	One Day at a Time (1981)

Singles from Believe Me Now or Believe Me Later
- 1. "Let's Get Down to Business" Released: 1976

Believe Me Now or Believe Me Later is a studio album by Australian singer Diana Trask. It was released in May 1976 by ABC Records and consisted of 12 tracks. The album was recorded in California in an effort for Trask to develop a new musical sound alongside producer Joe Porter. It was given a positive review by Cash Box and resulted in one single titled "Let's Get Down to Business".

== Background, recording and content ==
Australian-born Diana Trask went to the United States in 1958 and launched her career as a pop singer. After making two albums for Columbia Records and appearing on Sing Along with Mitch, she reinvented herself as a country recording artist beginning with her first singles for the genre in 1968. She reached her peak commercial success in the seventies with several US top 20 country songs such as "Say When" and "Lean It All on Me". Trask recalled in her memoir that she attempted to find a new record producer in an effort to have a new musical sound.

This resulted in Trask meeting with ABC Records' California headquarter where she began collaborating with producer Joe Porter. Her album was recorded at Davlen Sound Recorders in Hollywood, California. Believe Me Now or Believe Me Later consisted of 12 tracks. Included were four songs penned by Linda Hargrove: "All Alone in Austin", "New York City Song", "Sing Feelin' Sing" and "Fallen Angel". "Rock Me Sweet" was written by Waylon Jennings while "Little Joe" was written by Trask herself.

== Release, critical reception and singles ==
Believe Me Now or Believe Me Later was released by ABC Records in May 1976 and was Trask's eleventh studio album in her career. It was distributed as a vinyl LP with six songs on each side of the disc. The album received a positive review from Cash Box which called it "a winning combination" of upbeat and ballad songs. In addition, the publication wrote, "It is one of those albums that can be classified as containing nothing but Diana Trask magic from beginning to end. Diana proves her versatility as a singer, and she is well on her way to superstardom." Trask wrote in her memoir that despite working alongside Porter for the project, "things didn't work out" in terms of commercial success. She was later dropped from the ABC label. Nonetheless, one single was spawned from the album: "Let's Get Down to Business" (1976).

== Track listing ==
Side one
No.	Title	Writer(s)	Length
1.	"Rock Me Sweet"	W. Jennings	3:51
2.	"All Alone in Austin"	L. Hargrove	3:26
3.	"It's Too Late"	B. Goldsboro	3:28
4.	"New York City Song"	L. Hargrove	4:07
5.	"Sing Feelin' Sing"	L. Hargrove	4:21
6.	"Empty Chairs"	D. McLean	5:06

Side two
No.	Title	Writer(s)	Length
1.	"Let's Get Down to Business"	J. Dugan	3:02
2.	"But He Was Good for Me"	F. Huddleston	4:03
3.	"Fallen Angel"	L. Hargrove	3:34
4.	"Little Joe"	D. Trask	4:29
5.	"One Step Away from Your Arms"	B. Cadd	3:16
6.	"Lover and a Friend"	G. McEuen; M. Manseau	4:00

== Personnel ==
All credits are adapted from the liner notes of Believe Me Now or Believe Me Later.

Musical personnel

- Mike Anthony – Banjo, guitar
- John Barnes, Jr. – Piano
- Ben Benay – Guitar, harmonica
- James Gadson – Drums
- Lonnie Groves – Singer
- Bobbye Hall – Percussion
- Pat Henderson – Singer
- JayDee Maness – Steel guitar
- Myrna Matthews – Singer
- Marti McCall – Singer
- Chuck Rainey – Bass guitar
- Diana Trask – Lead vocals
- Julia Tillman Waters – Singer
- Maxine Willard Waters – Singer
- Caroline Willis – Singer

Technical personnel

- John Barnes, Jr. – Arrangement
- Linda Blaskey – Special thanks
- Eric Hookstratten – Special thanks
- Earl Klasky – Album design
- Antonin Kratochvil – Photography
- Bob Lyman – Special thanks
- Mike Nemo – Assistant mix engineer
- Nyesta – Stage wardrobe
- Joe Porter – Producer
- Eric Prestidge – Engineer
- David Reeves & Auto Wreck Yard – Special thanks
- Joy Stevens – Cover fashions
- Tom Wilkes – Art direction
- Thom Wilson – Assistant engineer

== Release history ==
Region	Date	Format	Label	Ref.
North America	May 1976	Vinyl LP	ABC Records	
Australia	May 1976	Vinyl LP; cassette	Dot Records	
