= It's a Man's World =

It's a Man's World may refer to:

- It's a Man's World (Anastacia album), 2012
- It's a Man's World (Cher album), 1995
- It's a Man's World (Diana Trask album), 1973
- It's a Man's World (Ed Ames album), 1965
- It's a Man's World (Sarah Vaughan album), 1967
- It's a Man's World (TV series), a television series that aired in 1962–63

== See also ==
- "It's a Man's Man's Man's World", a 1966 song by James Brown and Betty Jean Newsome, provisionally entitled "It's a Man's World"
- It's a Man's Man's Man's World (album), a 1966 compilation album by James Brown
- "It's a Man's World (If You Had a Man Like Mine)", a 1973 song by Diana Trask
- It's a Man's Man's World, a 1974 album by Renée Geyer
- "Man's World" (song), a 2020 song by Marina
