= Say When =

Say When may refer to:

- Say When!!, a 1960s American gameshow
- Say When (film), an alternative title for the 2014 film Laggies
- Say When (musical), a 1934 musical by Ray Henderson
- "Say When" (Lonestar song), 1998
- "Say When" (Diana Trask song), 1973
- "Say When", a song by the Fray in their album The Fray, 2009
- "Say When", a song by Lene Lovich in their album Stateless, 1978
