= Diana Trask on TV =

Studio album by Diana Trask with Mitch Miller's Sing Along Chorus
- Released: November 1961
- Genre: Pop
- Label: Columbia
- Producer: Mitch Miller

Diana Trask with Mitch Miller's Sing Along Chorus chronology
Diana Trask (1961)	Diana Trask on TV (1961)	Just for You (1965)

Singles from Diana Trask on TV
- 1. "Waltzing Matilda" Released: February 1961

Diana Trask on TV is a studio album by Australian singer Diana Trask, along with Mitch Miller's Sing Along Chorus. It was released in November 1961 by Columbia Records was her second studio album. The project was a collection of 12 tracks featuring covers of songs such as "Baby, It's Cold Outside" and the Australian folk tune "Waltzing Matilda". It received positive reviews from Billboard and Cash Box magazines.

== Background, recording and content ==
Diana Trask was among the first Australian artists to find success in the United States, alongside The Seekers and Helen Reddy. After leaving her home country, Trask got a recording contract with Columbia Records and a regular spot on the television series Sing Along with Mitch. The show was crafted by producer Mitch Miller, who was also responsible for producing Trask's second studio album. The project featured Mitch Miller's Sing Along Chorus, which received credit on the album. According to Trask, the album was recorded after the show was picked by the NBC network for a second season. Unlike her future country recordings, Trask's Columbia albums were marketed towards pop music. The project was a collection of 12 tracks featuring covers of "Baby It's Cold Outside", "I'm Sitting on Top of the World" and "Love Is the Sweetest Thing".

== Release, reception and singles ==
Diana Trask on TV was released in November 1961 by Columbia Records and was among 21 albums the label released that month. The label distributed it as a vinyl LP, with six songs on each side of the disc. It was offered in either mono or stereo formats. The album received positive reviews from music publications following its release. Billboard called it "a package of solid standards with a big, tasteful sound." Cash Box concluded that "The Trask voice has a legit, professional quality that should make this LP a possible chart contender." Although a review was not provided, AllMusic gave the album three out of five stars. One single was included on the album: "Waltzing Matilda". The song was a cover of an Australian folk tune, and Cash Box described Trask's version as "swinging".

== Track listing ==
Side one
No.	Title	Writer(s)	Length
1.	"Why Was I Born"	O. Hammerstein II; J. Kern	3:12
2.	"The Heather on the Hill"	F. Loewe; A Lerner	2:54
3.	"Love Is the Sweetest Thing"	R. Noble	2:32
4.	"It's a Big Wide Wonderful World"	J. Rox	2:06
5.	"I Enjoy Being a Girl"	O. Hammerstein II; R. Rodgers	3:45
6.	"Baby, It's Cold Outside"	F. Loewe	2:39

Side two
No.	Title	Writer(s)	Length
1.	"Puttin' On the Ritz"	I. Berlin	2:30
2.	"Exactly Like You"	D. Fields; J. McHugh	2:13
3.	"Waltzing Matilda"	A. Paterson; M. Cowan	2:24
4.	"I'm Sitting on Top of the World"	S. Lewis; J. Young; R. Henderson	1:51
5.	"Saturday Night (Is the Loneliest Night of the Week)"	S. Cahn; J. Styne	2:15
6.	"Always True to You in My Fashion"	C. Porter	2:05

== Personnel ==
All credits are adapted from the liner notes of Diana Trask on TV.

- Jimmy Carroll – arrangements
- Larry Fried – photography
- Mitch Miller – producer

== Release history ==
Region	Date	Format	Label	Ref.
North America	November 1961	Vinyl LP (mono); Vinyl LP (stereo)	Columbia Records	
Australia	November 1961	Vinyl LP (mono); Vinyl LP (stereo)	Coronet Records	
Australia	November 1961	Vinyl LP (stereo)	Harmony Records	
