= Diana's Country =

Studio album by Diana Trask
- Released: May 1971
- Studio: Woodland Sound Studio
- Genre: Country
- Label: Dot
- Producer: Buddy Killen

Diana Trask chronology
From the Heart (1969)	Diana's Country (1971)	Diana Trask Sings About Loving (1972)

Singles from Diana's Country
- 1. "The Last Person to See Me Alive" Released: February 1971; 2. "The Chokin' Kind" Released: June 1971

Diana's Country is a studio album by Australian singer Diana Trask. It was released by Dot Records in May 1971 and was the sixth studio album of her career. The project was a collection of 11 tracks featuring covers of songs like "The Chokin' Kind". The latter was one of two singles included on the album. "The Chokin' Kind" made the US country songs chart following its release. Diana's Country received positive reviews from both Billboard and Cash Box magazines following its release.

== Background, recording and content ==
Diana Trask originally recorded for Columbia Records in the pop field and had two albums released. She then returned to her native Australia in the mid-1960s before returning to the United States in the late 1960s. Trask developed a fondness for country music and decided to move her music in that direction. Her first country album was released in 1969 called Miss Country Soul and through 1972 she had charting singles. During this period, saw the release of her studio album Diana's Country. Although the liner notes claim the project was recorded at the Woodland Sound Studio in Nashville, Tennessee Record World and Billboard magazines reported that Trask cut the it in Muscle Shoals, Alabama. Specifically, Trask and producer Buddy Killen did overdub sessions at an unnamed studio there. Diana's Country was a collection of 11 tracks. It included versions of "Green, Green Grass of Home" and "The Chokin' Kind".

== Release, critical reception and singles ==
Diana's Country was released by Dot Records in May 1971 and was the sixth studio album of her career. It was issued as a vinyl LP, featuring six tracks on "side 1" and five tracks on "side two". The album was received positively by music magazines following its release. Billboard praised Trask's singing, writing, "Diana Trask's voice and vocal technique is highly individualistic and she brings to the country field something fresh and bright." Cash Box found Trask's country sound to be authentic, writing, "Diana Trask is country all the way. After listening to the 11 songs on this album, you'll want to hear more." Two singles were included on the project. Its earliest release was "The Last Person to See Me Alive" (issued by Dot Records in February 1971). It was followed by Dot's release of "The Chokin' Kind" in June 1971. The latter rose to the number 59 on the US Hot Country Songs chart in 1971, becoming her sixth charting single on the country survey.

== Track listing ==
Side one
No.	Title	Writer(s)	Length
1.	"The Last Person to See Me Alive"	I. Gasman; C. Hoffman; J. Barr	2:59
2.	"The Chokin' Kind"	Harlan Howard	2:30
3.	"I Keep It Hid"	J. Webb	3:33
4.	"Mama Said, Yeah"	Red Lane; Toad Lane	2:42
5.	"A Stronger Hand to Hold"	D. Samson; R. Van Hoy	2:35
6.	"Don't Let It Get Away"	Dee Moeller	2:45

Side two
No.	Title	Writer(s)	Length
1.	"Hope I Don't Feel Dirty in the Morning"	Diana Trask; Buddy Mize	2:57
2.	"Charlie"	Dee Moeller	2:53
3.	"Green Green Grass of Home"	C. Putman	4:03
4.	"Let's Keep Her Free (America)"	Diana Trask; Tom Ewen	2:58
5.	"Grandview Baptist Church"	John Hurley; Ronnie Wilkins	3:20

== Personnel ==
All credits are adapted from the liner notes of Diana's Country.

- Mickey Buckins – Recording engineer
- Buddy Killen – Producer
- Ruby Mazor – Art direction
- Jim Moore – Cover and backliner photo
- Ernie Winfrey – Recording engineer

== Release history ==
Region	Date	Format	Label	Ref.
North America	May 1971	Vinyl LP (stereo)	Dot Records	
