= Miss Country Soul =

Studio album by Diana Trask
- Released: February 1969
- Studio: Columbia Studio
- Genre: Country; soul
- Label: Dot
- Producer: Buddy Killen

Diana Trask chronology
Just for You (1965)	Miss Country Soul (1969)	From the Heart (1969)

Singles from Miss Country Soul
- 1. "Hold What You've Got" Released: September 1968; 2. "You Got What It Takes" Released: March 1969

Miss Country Soul is a studio album by Australian singer Diana Trask. It was released in February 1969 by Dot Records and consisted of 12 tracks written entirely by American soul artist Joe Tex. The album was marketed as a country recording and reached the top 40 of the US country chart. Of its two singles, "Hold What You've Got" was the only one to chart, making the US country songs chart in 1969. The album itself received positive reviews from Billboard and Cash Box magazines.

== Background ==
Australian singer Diana Trask found commercial success in the United States during the 1960s and 1970s. She began her career as a pop artist but transitioned into country music after finding an appreciation for the Nashville, Tennessee music community. Her 1968 single, "Lock, Stock and Teardrops", made the US country chart and was followed by "Hold What You've Got". The latter was released on Miss Country Soul. In Trask's autobiography, she explained that her producer (Buddy Killen) aimed to take her music "in a slightly different direction" by incorporating a soul music sound. The same style was incorporated into Miss Country Soul.

== Recording and content ==
Killen approached American soul singer-songwriter, Joe Tex, about having Trask record an entire album of his music. Despite his initial hesitation about a white singer (Tex was black) recording his music, Tex agreed to the project. Tex was pleasantly surprised when he heard the final product and found that Trask sang with emotional depth and power. He ultimately wrote the liner notes for Miss Country Soul. Miss Country Soul was recorded in sessions held at the Columbia Studio in Nashville, Tennessee with Buddy Killen serving as the sole producer. The album consisted of 12 tracks all of which were penned by Tex himself. It included Tex's popular recording of "Hold What You've Got", "I'll Never Do You Wrong" and "Show Me".

== Release and critical reception ==
Miss Country Soul was released by Dot Records in February 1969 and was Trask's fourth studio album. It was distributed as a vinyl LP with six songs on each side of the disc. It was later reissued by Ember Records in 1974 and Pickwick Records in 1976. The album received positive reviews from publications following its release. Cash Box magazine wrote, "With all the material culled from the Joe Tex grab-bag-and done up in pure soul-the set should further Australian-American relations in a hurry, and should help strengthen Diana's position with country buyers." Record World magazine called the album "a delight" and also stated, "The affinity between country and R/B is underlined in this first country from ex-Aussie Diana Trask."

== Chart performance and singles ==
Miss Country Soul made the US Billboard Top Country Albums chart, climbing to the number 34 position in 1969. It was Trask's first album to make the US country chart and one of five to make the chart through 1976. A total of two singles were included on the album. The earliest single was "Hold What You've Got", which was first released by Dot Records in September 1968. It reached the number 59 position on the US Hot Country Songs chart, becoming Trask's second single to make the chart in her career. The album's second single was "You Got What It Takes", which was issued by Dot Records in March 1969.

== Track listing ==
All songs were composed by Joe Tex, according to the liner notes.

Side one
No.	Title	Length
1.	"Show Me"	2:56
2.	"I've Got to Do a Little Bit Better"	2:57
3.	"Build Your Love (On a Solid Foundation)"	2:19
4.	"A Woman (Can Change a Man)"	2:38
5.	"I'll Never Do You Wrong"	2:50
6.	"Keep the One You've Got"	2:42

Side two
No.	Title	Length
1.	"You Got What It Takes"	2:09
2.	"A Sweet Woman Like You"	2:33
3.	"(The Letter Song) S.Y.S.L.J.F.M."	2:49
4.	"Don't Make Your Children Pay (For Your Mistakes)"	2:58
5.	"Hold What You've Got"	3:10
6.	"I Want To (Do Everything for You)"	2:27

== Personnel ==
All credits are adapted from the liner notes of Miss Country Soul.

- Charlie Bragg – Engineer
- Buddy Killen – Producer
- Ivan Nagy – Photography
- Joe Tex – Liner notes
- Christopher Whorf – Art direction
- Neil Wilburn – Engineer

== Chart performance ==
Chart (1969)	Peak position
US Top Country Albums (Billboard)	34

== Release history ==
Region	Date	Format	Label	Ref.
North America	February 1969	Vinyl LP (stereo)	Dot Records	
Australia	February 1969	Vinyl LP (stereo)	Dot Records	
United Kingdom	1974	Vinyl LP (stereo)	Ember Records	
United States	1976	Vinyl LP (stereo)	Pickwick Records	
