= It's a Man's World (Diana Trask album) =

Studio album by Diana Trask
- Released: December 1973
- Genres: Country; country-soul
- Label: Dot
- Producer: Norris Wilson

Diana Trask chronology
Diana Trask Sings About Loving (1972)	It's a Man's World (1973)	Lean It All on Me (1974)

Singles from It's a Man's World
- 1. "Say When" Released: February 1973; 2. "It's a Man's World (If You Had a Man Like Mine)" Released: June 1973; 3. "When I Get My Hands on You" Released: November 1973

It's a Man's World is a studio album by Australian singer Diana Trask. It was released by Dot Records in December 1973 and was the eighth studio album in her career. The LP was a collection of 11 country music recordings, three of which were penned by Trask herself. Some songs were covers, including Joe Stampley's "Soul Song". The album received a positive response from Billboard and Cash Box magazines. A total of three singles were included that were among Trask's highest-peaking on the US country chart: "Say When", the title track and "When I Get My Hands on You". The album itself made the top 25 of the US country LP's survey.

== Background ==
Australian Diana Trask transplanted to the United States in 1959 and recorded two pop albums for Columbia Records under the production of Mitch Miller. She also appeared as a cast member on his television program titled Sing Along with Mitch. After a brief stint in Australia, she returned to the US and was in search of a new direction. She ultimately turned to country music after being drawn to its music community in Nashville, Tennessee. Her first US country chart singles were released in 1968 but it would not be until the early 1970s that she reached her peak commercial success with songs like "Say When" and "It's a Man's World (If You Had a Man Like Mine)". Trask also credited her peak success to new producer Norro Wilson (Norris Wilson) and the Jim Halsey agency for managing her bookings. Wilson would ultimately produce her 1973 album It's a Man's World.

== Recording and content ==
It's a Man's World was produced by Norris Wilson along with string arrangements from Cam Mullins. The album was a collection of 11 songs. When commenting about the title tune, the liner notes stated, "The Women's Lib cult may be offended by the title It's a Man's World. However, when they hear Diana sing this song to which she adds the phrase 'If you had a man like mine,' they will understand what she has in mind. They just haven't been exposed to the 'Trask Force'." Another track, "Till I Get It Right" was later a popular single by Tammy Wynette. Trask claimed in her memoir that she was given the song first but Wynette's producer had her cut the song and release it before Trask's version could be issued. Other cover tunes included Joe Stampley's "Soul Song", Barbara Fairchild's "Teddy Bear Song" and Gilbert O'Sullivan's "Alone Again (Naturally)". Three of the album's songs were co-written by Trask herself: "When I Get My Hands on You", "(If You Wanna Hold on) Hold on to Your Man" and "World of the Missing".

== Release and critical reception ==
It's a Man's World was released by Dot Records in December 1973 and was the eighth album in her career. It was distributed as a vinyl LP with five selections on either side of the disc. The album was given positive reviews by music publications at the time of its release. Billboard believed the album would be a strong seller due to its album cover and also praised Trask's "masterful" vocal style, calling it "a thing of beauty". Cash Box found Trask skilled in making songs her own: "Diana's ability to touch a song with her inimitable grace makes her musical performance indeed something special." The magazine also wrote positively of her musical style: "Diana is one of the newer female forces on the country scene that displays a certain vivacious vibrance that is incomparable."

== Chart performance and singles ==
It's a Man's World reached number 25 on the US Billboard Top Country Albums survey and was her highest-peaking LP on the chart. It was her first LP since 1969's From the Heart to make the country survey and one of four to do so in her career. Three singles were included or spawned from It's a Man's World. The earliest single issued was "Say When" in February 1973, which was Trask's first top 20 single on the US Hot Country Songs chart, rising to number 15. It was followed in June 1973 by title track, which was Trask's second top 20 US country song, peaking at number 20. "When I Get My Hands on You" was spawned from the LP in November 1973. It peaked at number 16 on the US country songs chart, becoming her third consecutive top 20 song. In addition, all three singles made Canada's RPM Country Tracks chart. "Say When" was its highest-peaking single in Canada, reaching number eight on the chart in 1973.

== Track listing ==
Side one
No.	Title	Writer(s)	Length
1.	"It's a Man's World (If You Had a Man Like Mine)"	Wilson; Taylor; Sutton	2:36
2.	"Say When"	Bruce; Wilson; Taylor	2:06
3.	"Till I Get It Right"	Lane; Henley	2:30
4.	"Soul Song"	Richey; Sherrill; Wilson	2:20
5.	"Shadow of My Man"	Hargrove	2:14
6.	"World of the Missing"	Wilson; Taylor; Trask	2:46

Side two
No.	Title	Writer(s)	Length
1.	"When I Get My Hands on You"	Wilson; Taylor; Trask	2:47
2.	"(If You Wanna Hold On) Hold on to Your Man Tonight"	Trask; Ewen	2:10
3.	"Love Lives Again"	Richey; Taylor; Wilson	3:06
4.	"Teddy Bear Song"	Nixon; Earl	3:32
5.	"Alone Again Naturally"	O'Sullivan	3:24

== Personnel ==
All credits are adapted from the liner notes of It's a Man's World.

- Lou Bradley – Engineer
- Cam Mullins – String arrangements
- Ron Reynolds – Engineer
- Charlie Tallent – Engineer
- Norris Wilson – Producer

== Chart performance ==
Chart (1973–1974)	Peak position
US Top Country Albums (Billboard)	25

== Release history ==
Region	Date	Format	Label	Ref.
North America	December 1973	Vinyl LP (stereo)	Dot Records	
