= (If You Wanna Hold on) Hold on to Your Man =

Single by Diana Trask

from the album Lean It All on Me
- B-side: "Loneliness (Can Break A Good Girl Down)"
- Released: August 1974
- Genre: Country; soul
- Length: 2:13
- Label: Dot
- Songwriter(s): Diana Trask; Tom Ewen
- Producer(s): Norro Wilson

Diana Trask singles chronology
"Lean It All on Me" (1974)	"(If You Wanna Hold on) Hold on to Your Man" (1974)	"Oh Boy" (1974)

"(If You Wanna Hold on) Hold on to Your Man" is a song originally recorded by Australian singer Diana Trask. It was also co-written by Trask and her husband Tom Ewen. Released as a single, it reached the top 40 on the US country songs chart in 1974. It was one of ten US top 40 country singles for Trask and was issued on her album titled Lean It All on Me.

== Background, recording and content ==
Although she was originally a pop singer in the early sixties, Diana Trask transitioned into a country singer in the late sixties. Although her first country singles were issued in 1968, it was not until 1973 that she reached the top 20 regularly. Among her chart records from this period was "(If You Wanna Hold on) Hold on to Your Man". The song was produced by Norro Wilson and co-written by Trask and her husband Tom Ewen.

== Release, critical reception and chart performance ==
"(If You Wanna Hold on) Hold on to Your Man" was issued as a single by Dot Records in August 1974. It was distributed as a seven-inch vinyl record with the B-side "Loneliness (Can Break A Good Girl Down)". It was reviewed positively by Billboard magazine who called it "a turn-on" and "really strong". The song spent two weeks on the US Billboard Hot Country Songs chart, rising to the number 32 position on October 5, 1974. It was one of ten top 40 singles for Trask on the US country chart and among her final as well. It was the second single spawned from her 1974 album Lean It All on Me.

== Track listings ==
7" vinyl single

- "(If You Wanna Hold on) Hold on to Your Man" – 2:13
- "Loneliness (Can Break A Good Girl Down)" – 2:31

== Charts ==
Weekly chart performance for "(If You Wanna Hold on) Hold on to Your Man"
Chart (1974)	Peak position
US Hot Country Songs (Billboard)	32
