= The Mood I'm In =

Studio album by Diana Trask
- Released: June 1975
- Studio: Jack Clement Recording Studio
- Genre: Country
- Label: ABC–Dot
- Producer: Jim Foglesong

Diana Trask chronology
Diana Trask's Greatest Hits (1974)	The Mood I'm In (1975)	Believe Me Now or Believe Me Later (1976)

Singles from The Mood I'm In
- 1. "Oh Boy" Released: December 1974; 2. "There Has to Be a Loser" Released: May 1975

The Mood I'm In is a studio album by Australian singer Diana Trask. It was released in June 1975 by the ABC–Dot label and was her tenth studio album. The album consisted of 11 tracks, featuring some new songs but mostly cover tunes. The album received positive reviews from music magazines following its release and included two singles. Its most successful single was "Oh Boy", which became a top ten single in Australia and reached the North American country charts.

== Background, recording and content ==
Australian native Diana Trask moved to the United States in 1958 and began her career as a pop singer at Columbia Records. After recording two albums and a brief stint in Australia, Trask returned to the US and reinvented herself as a country singer in 1968. Although her singles made the US country charts it was not until the seventies that she reached her peak success with several top 20 and top 40 recordings. Among her popular recordings was 1975's "Oh Boy" whose lyrics would form the name of her album The Mood I'm In. The project was recorded at the Jack Clement Recording Studio in Nashville, Tennessee and was produced by Jim Foglesong. The Mood I'm In was a collection of 11 songs many of which were cover tunes. Generally, the album's concept centered on the different "moods" or emotions an individual can exhibit. Of the new recordings was the track "There Has to Be a Loser" (written by Paul Anka) which told the story how relationships that become unsuccessful.

== Release and critical reception ==
The Mood I'm In was released by the ABC–Dot label in June 1975. It was Trask's tenth studio album in her career and her seventh with the label. It was distributed as a vinyl LP with five songs on "side 1" and six songs on "side 2". The project received positive reviews from music magazines following its release. Billboard found that "many of the songs have been done by others, but none any better". They also spoke of Trask's vocal ability: "No matter what mood Diana is in, she can sing a song with warmth, tenderness, or really belt it out." Cash Box also praised Trask's vocal performance, writing, "The lovely and dynamically talented Ms. T rask lets you know exactly how it feels to be in a mood. Her sultry vocals deliver her moods."

== Chart performance and singles ==
The Mood I'm In was Trask's first album to make Australia's Kent Music Report chart, rising to the number 65 position in 1975. Three other albums in her career would make the chart (Nothing but the Very Best would be her final to do so in 1988). Two singles were part of the album. Its earliest single was "Oh Boy", which was released in December 1974. It rose to number 21 on the US Hot Country Songs chart and number 14 on the Canadian Country Tracks chart. In her native Australia, it became a top ten song, rising to number ten on the Kent Music Report chart.

== Track listing ==
Side one
No.	Title	Writer(s)	Length
1.	"Oh Boy"	Tony Romeo	2:31
2.	"Country Bumpkin"	Don Wayne	4:07
3.	"A Whole Lotta Things to Sing About"	Ben Peters	2:47
4.	"Fever"	John Davenport; Ed Cooley	3:23
5.	"Back Home Again"	John Denver	3:35

Side two
No.	Title	Writer(s)	Length
1.	"There Has to Be a Loser"	Paul Anka	2:45
2.	"I Can Take a Little Heartache"	John Barranco; John Stroll	2:18
3.	"Sunshine"	Edgar Bronfman, Jr.; Bruce Roberts	3:10
4.	"Evil on Your Mind"	Harlan Howard	2:30
5.	"Alone Again Naturally"	Gilbert O'Sullivan	3:44
6.	"I've Been So Wrong for So Long"	Bud Reneau; Hal Bynum	3:00

== Personnel ==
All credits are adapted from the liner notes of The Mood I'm In.

- Harold Bradley – Basic arrangements
- Tim Bryant – Album design
- Jim Foglesong – Producer
- Bill McElhiney – String arrangements
- Ron Slenzak – Photography
- Bill Walker – String arrangements
- Jim Williamson – Engineer

== Charts ==
Chart (1975)	Peak position
Australia (Kent Music Report)	65

== Release history ==
Region	Date	Format	Label	Ref.
North America	June 1975	Vinyl LP	ABC–Dot Records	
Australia	June 1975	Vinyl LP; cassette	Dot Records	
