= Lean It All on Me (album) =

Studio album by Diana Trask
- Released: May 1974
- Genre: Country
- Label: Dot
- Producer: Norro Wilson

Diana Trask chronology
It's a Man's World (1973)	Lean It All on Me (1974)	Diana Trask's Greatest Hits (1974)

Singles from Lean It All on Me
- 1. "Lean It All on Me" Released: March 1974; 2. "(If You Wanna Hold on) Hold on to Your Man" Released: August 1974

Lean It All on Me is a studio album by Australian singer Diana Trask. It was released in May 1974 by Dot Records and consisted of 11 tracks. The country-themed project featured cover tunes and new recordings. Among its original songs were two single releases: the title track and "(If You Wanna Hold on) Hold on to Your Man". The title track was a top 20 song on both the US and Canadian country charts in 1974. The album itself received a positive reception from Billboard, Cash Box and AllMusic.

== Background ==
Diana Trask left Australia for the United States in 1958 in search of better performing opportunities. She first performed as a pop singer and eventually signed with Columbia Records where she cut two albums. She also appeared as a regular on the television program Sing Along with Mitch. Trask then returned to Australia but came back to the US in the late sixties. Finding an appreciation for the country music industry, she ultimately started recording for the genre. Her initial releases made the US country charts but it would be her 1970s singles that brought her greatest commercial success, including the top 15 song "Lean It All on Me". The single served as the name for her fifth Dot Records studio album in 1974.

== Recording and content ==
Lean It All on Me was produced by Norro Wilson and featured liner notes written by Roy Clark. The album was a collection of 11 tracks. Among them was the title track penned by Josh Whitmore and "(If You Wanna Hold on) Hold on to Your Man", which was co-written by Trask. Wilson also co-wrote three of the songs on the album: "Loneliness (Can Break a Good Girl Down)", "Get It (While the Gettin's Good)" and "He Took Me for a Ride". Cover songs are also included on the project such as Jeanne Pruett's "Satin Sheets" (which she reworded to "Cotton Sheets"), Charlie Rich's "Behind Closed Doors" and Janis Ian's "Jesse".

== Release and critical reception ==
Professional ratings
Review scores
Source	Rating
Allmusic	4.5/5 stars

Lean It All on Me was released originally by Dot Records in May 1974 and was the ninth studio album in her career (her fifth with Dot). It was distributed as a vinyl LP that included six tracks on "side 1" and five tracks on "side 2". The project received positive reviews from music publications and websites. Billboard called it "a truly remarkable album" that showcased "her versatility" and the "richness in her voice". Cash Box wrote, "One listen to the power, sensitivity, and polished professionalism that Ms. Trask conveys in her vocals and song interpretations will quickly reveal that she is really something special." AllMusic website reviewer Greg Adams gave the project a four and a half star rating, comparing Trask to "a young Barbara Mandrell" in musical style. Adams also praised her "bold vocal performances" and concluded, "where did Trask get her Southern accent?" (in reference to Trask being Australian).

== Chart performance and singles ==
Lean It All on Me was one of five albums in Trask's career to make the US Billboard Top Country Albums chart, rising to the number 34 position in 1974. Two singles were included on the album project. Its earliest single was the title track, which was first released by Dot in March 1974. It rose into the US Hot Country Songs top 20, peaking at number 13 and reaching a similar position on Canada's country chart, peaking at number 12. "(If You Wanna Hold on) Hold on to Your Man" was spawned as the second single in August 1974. It reached the top 40 of the US country songs chart, peaking at number 32 that year.

== Track listing ==
Side one
No.	Title	Writer(s)	Length
1.	"Lean It All on Me"	Josh Whitmore	2:50
2.	"Behind Closed Doors"	Kenny O'Dell	3:42
3.	"Get It (While the Getting's Good)"	C. Taylor; N. Wilson; G. Richey	2:01
4.	"Satin Sheets (Cotton Sheets)"	John E. Volinkaty	2:11
5.	"(If You Wanna Hold on) Hold on to Your Man"	Diana Trask; Tom Ewen	2:08
6.	"Jesse"	Janis Ian	3:53

Side two
No.	Title	Writer(s)	Length
1.	"He Took Me for a Ride"	C. Taylor; N. Wilson; S. Tackitt	2:27
2.	"The King"	E. Montgomery	2:27
3.	"Loving Arms"	Tom Jans	2:24
4.	"Let Me Be There"	John Rostill	2:51
5.	"Loneliness (Can Break A Good Girl Down)"	C. Taylor; G. Richey; N. Wilson	2:31

== Personnel ==
All credits are adapted from the liner notes of Lean It All on Me.

- Lou Bradley – Engineer
- Roy Clark – Liner notes
- Ron Reynolds – Engineer
- Albert Watson – Photography
- Norris Wilson – Producer
- Bergen White – Arrangements

== Chart performance ==
Chart (1974)	Peak position
US Top Country Albums (Billboard)	34

== Release history ==
Region	Date	Format	Label	Ref.
North America	May 1974	Vinyl LP	Dot Records	
Australia	May 1974	Vinyl LP	Dot Records	
United Kingdom	May 1974	Vinyl LP; cassette	Ember Records	
