= Diana Trask (album) =

Studio album by Diana Trask
- Released: March 1961
- Genre: Pop
- Label: Columbia
- Producer: Mitch Miller

Diana Trask chronology
Diana Trask (1961)	Diana Trask on TV (1961)

Diana Trask is a studio album by Australian singer Diana Trask. It was released by Columbia Records in March 1961 and was the debut studio album in her career. The album consisted of 12 tracks, most of which were cover tunes including "It Might as Well Be Spring" and "My Funny Valentine". It was marked towards the pop market and was reviewed by Billboard along with Cash Box magazine.

== Background, recording and content ==
Along with The Seekers and Helen Reddy, Diana Trask was considered among the first Australian-born singers to find success in the US. She signed with Columbia Records upon her arrival to the United States. Although her later music was commercially successful in the country genre, her first two LP's marketed towards pop. Trask's debut eponymous studio album was produced by Mitch Miller Trask recalled that the album was recorded in a converted church located in the Tin Pan Alley neighborhood of New York City. Along with Miller's production, the arrangements were conducted by Glenn Osser. In her memoir, Trask also remembered that Miller had a "strict" recording formula that did not allow her to perform in the jazz style that she was accustomed to. Despite this, Trask still had fond memories of making the album with Miller. The album was a collection of 12 tracks backed with string orchestration by Osser. It included covers of "Little Girl Blue", "It Might as Well Be Spring", "Let's Face the Music and Dance" and "My Funny Valentine".

== Release and critical reception ==
Diana Trask was one of several LP's issued by Columbia in March 1961. It was Trask's debut studio album in her career. It was distributed by Columbia Records as a vinyl LP with six songs on each side of the disc. It was offered in both mono and stereo formats. It was issued in Australia by Coronet Records in a similar LP format. The album was given positive reviews from music magazines upon its release. Billboard named among a handful of albums to have "strong sales potential" and commented, "She sings with great warmth, style and maturity and shows promise of becoming one of the established hit-makers." The publication then concluded by writing, "A listenable album for the thrush and one that can grab jock interest as well as counter activity". Cash Box called Trask "an extremely capable songbird" and called the LP "a delicious first album".

== Track listing ==
Side one
No.	Title	Writer(s)	Length
1.	"It Might as Well Be Spring"	O. Hammerstein; R. Rodgers	3:49
2.	"Little Girl Blue"	L. Hart; R. Rodgers	4:30
3.	"Spring Is Here"	L. Hart; R. Rodgers	3:55
4.	"My Funny Valentine"	L. Hart; R. Rodgers	4:26
5.	"By Myself"	H. Dietz; A. Schwartz	3:36
6.	"Spring Never Comes"	N. Kaye; K. Barry	4:20

Side two
No.	Title	Writer(s)	Length
1.	"Hello, Young Lovers"	O. Hammerstein; R. Rodgers	2:50
2.	"Let's Fall in Love"	H. Arlen; T. Koehler	2:50
3.	"I Hear Music"	F. Loesser; B. Lane	1:56
4.	"The Gypsy in My Soul"	M. Jaffe; C. Boland	2:15
5.	"Let's Face the Music and Dance"	I. Berlin	2:00
6.	"Tempation"	A. Freed; N. H. Brown	2:05

== Personnel ==
All credits are adapted from the liner notes of Diana Trask.

- Glenn Osser – arrangements

== Release history ==
Region	Date	Format	Label	Ref.
North America	March 1961	Vinyl LP (mono); Vinyl LP (stereo)	Columbia Records	
Australia	March 1961	Vinyl LP (mono); Vinyl LP (stereo)	Coronet Records	
Spain	2009	Compact disc	LPTime Records	
