= Diana Trask =

Australian singer-songwriter (born 1940)

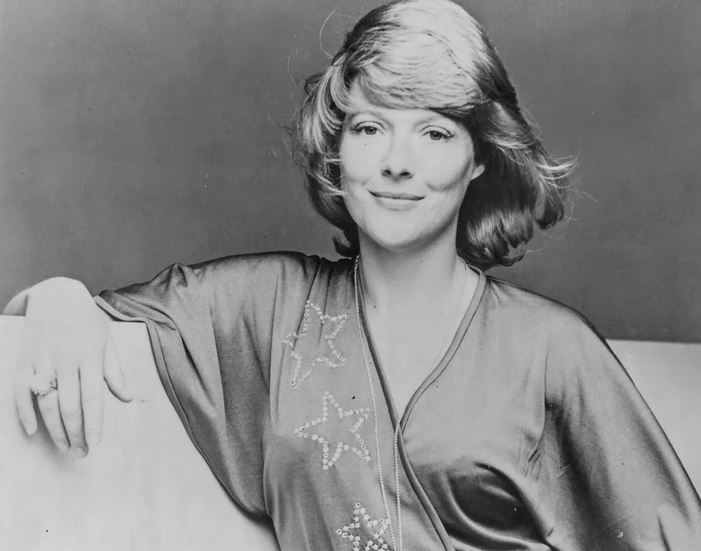
- Diana Trask in a publicity photograph, May 1975.
- Born: Diana Roselyn Trask; June 23, 1940 (age 86); Camberwell, Victoria, Australia
- Years active: 1958–present
- Works: Discography
- Title: Singer; songwriter; author
- Spouse: Thom Ewen (m. 1962; died 2009)
- Children: 2
- Relatives: Dame Nellie Melba (cousin)
- Musical career
- Genres: Country; country pop; jazz; pop
- Labels: W&G; Roulette; Columbia; CBS; Dial; Dot; ABC; Hammard; Trask
- Website: Official website

Diana Roselyn Trask (born 23 June 1940) is an Australian-American singer, songwriter and author. She was considered to be one of the first Australian music artists to find success in the United States, particularly in the genres of pop and country.

Born in Camberwell, Victoria, Trask had a musical upbringing and left school in her teens to pursue music full-time. She began her career in Melbourne and Sydney during the late fifties, appearing on local television and singing at clubs. After serving as Frank Sinatra's Australian opening act, she left for the US in 1958. She settled in New York City and received a recording contract from Mitch Miller of Columbia Records in 1960. Trask then became a series regular on his television program, Sing Along with Mitch, and recorded two studio albums released by Columbia in 1961: Diana Trask and Diana Trask on TV. Trask then married American businessman Thom Ewen, who became her full-time manager. The couple moved back to Australia, where her television program, The Di Trask Show, was syndicated for one season in 1965.

Trask then resettled in the US and reinvented herself as a country music artist. Settling in Nashville, Tennessee, Trask was signed to Dot Records in 1968, and her cover of "Hold What You've Got" made the US country chart. It was included on her first country album, Miss Country Soul, which also made the US country chart. Trask's music continued making the US country charts, and she toured alongside performer Roy Clark in several Las Vegas engagements. She reached her peak commercial success in the mid-seventies with four top 20 country songs: "Say When", "It's a Man's World", "When I Get My Hands on You" and "Lean It All on Me". Her 1974 single "Oh Boy" was a top ten song in Australia. She remained popular in Australia through the 1980s with albums like the gold-certified One Day at a Time (1981).

Trask went into semi-retirement as the eighties decade progressed. Sporadically, she returned to her music career, including performing at the 1985 Australian Grand Final. For the most part, Trask and her husband sailed the Caribbean, along with operating a store in Alaska. She also returned to college and received a degree in herbal medicine. In 2009, Trask's husband died, and she returned to her career. She co-wrote a memoir in 2010 called Whatever Happened to Diana Trask and released three albums on her own label titled Trask Enterprises: Country Lovin' (2010), Daughter of Australia (2014) and Memories Are Made of This (2016).

== Early life ==
Trask was born in Camberwell, a suburb of Melbourne, Victoria. She was one of three children born to Lew and Thelma Trask. Her older sister, Patsy Anna, died at the age of two after contracting Pink's Disease. She also has an older brother, Peter. Her father was the owner of a furniture business while her mother was a music teacher. Her cousin was Opera singer Dame Nellie Melba. She attended a local state school but transferred to a Catholic school because her mother found her challenging to manage. Spending week nights at the Catholic school, Trask only returned to her family's home on weekends. At age 11, her family sent her to another Catholic school with better resources in Melbourne. She enjoyed singing from an early age and routinely asked her mother to give her vocal lessons. However, her mother wanted her to wait until she was a teenager when her voice fully developed. Yet in August 1949 she won singing competition and then briefly received formal vocal lessons from her mother.

Trask dated her first boyfriend at age 15, but broke up with him shortly after discovering him kissing her mother in the family home. Her relationship with her mother then became strained. "In my confusion and self-doubt I thought she had betrayed me too and I held a grudge against her for a long, long time," she wrote in her memoir. Trask ultimately dropped out of school around age 16 and worked several minimum wage jobs while also working towards becoming a professional singer. She started received vocal lessons from Melbourne instructor Jack White, who helped her audition for the local Channel Seven television competition called Swallow's Parade. Trask won the competition and then won a second talent show, TV Quest, in 1957. Her first pair of singles were released in 1958 and 1959: "Going Steady" (issued by W&G) and "Soldier Won't You Marry Me" (issued by Roulette). She then did a small tour in Southern Australia and returned to Melbourne occasionally performing on the local television network. She often performed on a program called In Melbourne Tonight (IMT) but ended after it was rumored that Trask's father would sponsor the show through his furniture business. He ultimately declined which resulted in Trask losing her singing position.

Trask decided to move to Sydney where she was told she would find steadier singing opportunities. In Sydney, she lived with a friend of her father's and then with a group of girls in a small home located behind a doctor's office. Trask found work performing with the Australian Jazz Quartet and at the Sky Lounge in Sydney. She then obtained her own radio program on the ABC network called Diana Trask Sings, which was heard by American promoter Lee Gordon. Gordon arranged for her to open for international music artists, beginning with Frank Sinatra in 1959. Trask then opened shows for Sinatra in Melbourne and Sydney. Gordon then arranged for her to open shows for Sammy Davis Jr. in Melbourne, Sydney and Brisbane. Both performers encouraged Trask to move to the United States and in 1959 she officially left for the country. She stayed at Sinatra's Los Angeles home for several days. He offered Trask assistance with her career, but she declined insisting she could do it herself. She then moved to New York City.

== Career ==
=== 1959–1965: Pop music, Sing Along with Mitch and The Di Trask Show ===
Upon her New York arrival, Trask met agent Roz Ross (an associate of Lee Gordon's) who agreed to take her on. She debuted as a jazz singer at The Blue Angel nightclub in August 1959. Ross then arranged for Trask to tour throughout the United States, notably in Houston, Texas. She also appeared on the television program, Don McNeill's Breakfast Club. Ross then organized Trask to record a demo record for Columbia Records producer Mitch Miller. The pair then met with Miller in New York and he ultimately signed Trask to a contract with Columbia in 1960. Miller then brought Trask to New York's Tin Pan Alley neighborhood to record several selections. Trask recalled Miller reprimanding her when her vocal style "got too swingy" and on occasion telling her to leave the session until "you feel like doing it my way". Among her early Columbia singles was the 1961 pop ballad "Long Ago Last Summer", which Billboard called "highly spinnable". The song reached number 26 on Australia's pop chart. Two more 1960 Columbia singles were reissued by Coronet Records in Australia and made the top 60 of their pop chart: "A Guy Is a Guy" and "Our Language of Love".

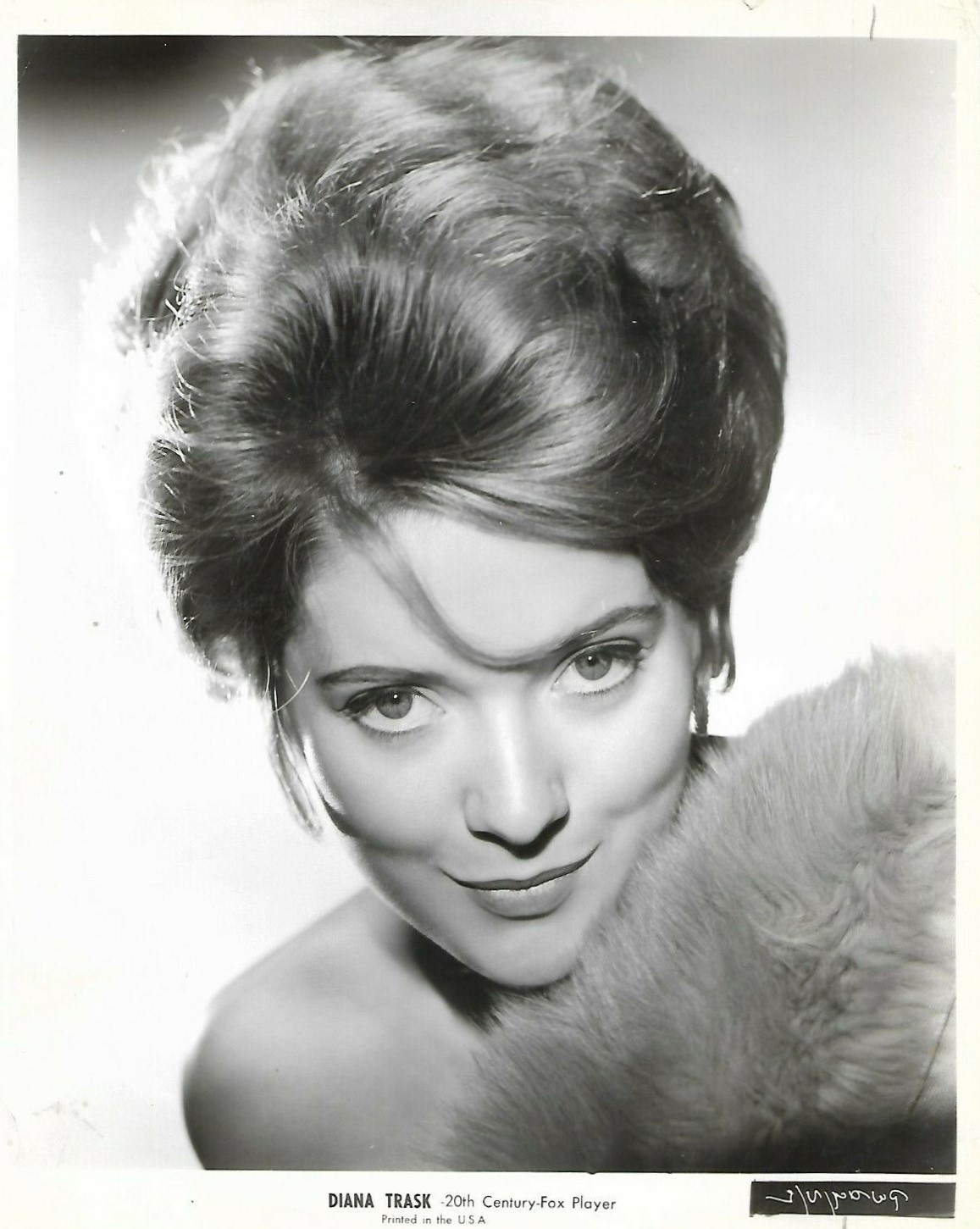

Miller then had Trask appear in a television pilot for a show based on old-fashioned movie theater "sing-alongs". It was then picked up NBC and was dubbed Sing Along with Mitch. She was then given a studio contract by 20th Century Fox who suggested she change her last name, but Trask declined. The studio then gave her a screen test for State Fair but she did not get the role. She then appeared with Jayne Mansfield in a television pilot for the show Monte Carlo. the pilot was not picked up and was instead shown on an episode of NBC's Kraft Mystery Theater. Columbia then issued Trask's first full-length eponymous album in March 1961 featuring arrangements by Glenn Osser and 12 covers of American pop standards. A second full-length LP was released in November 1961 titled Diana Trask on TV featuring Miller's "Sing Along Chorus" in the background. Twelve more cover tunes were featured including the Australian folk song "Waltzing Matilda" that was released as a single. Music publications of the era praised both albums for showcasing Trask's "mature" and "professional" singing style.

Trask's manager, Matt Forber, then approached Miller with getting her a raise. According to Trask, the offer angered Miller and it prompted him to drop her from the Sing Along cast in 1962. She then married American businessman Thom Ewen in Australia the same year and became pregnant. The couple then returned to the US where she met with Ross and Farber. According to Trask, both were disappointed that she had married and begun a pregnancy, ultimately dropping her from their roster as well. The couple then moved to Huntington Beach, California (and later San Diego, California) where she took a brief hiatus from her career and her husband worked for a beer company.

After an Australian entertainment friend suggested she return to her home country to restart her career, Trask and her husband moved back in 1963. She appeared regularly on In Melbourne Tonight on GTV-9 during that year. With her husband acting as her manager, Trask approached executives at GTV9 television to create a television pilot for The Di Trask Show. In 1965, the show was aired for a 13-week run with Ewen as producer. According to Nan Musgrove of The Australian Women's Weekly it "wasn't all that popular here but sold like hot cakes overseas in 26 countries." The show ultimately was not picked up for a second season. Trask theorized in her autobiography that it was due to Australian television still being "in its infancy". Meanwhile, she signed a five-year recording contract with CBS Records in 1964 and recorded an album. CBS then issued the 12-track collection, Just for You, in 1965. The LP's first single was titled "On the Road to Gundagai" and was followed in late 1965 by a second single titled "Too Young". Following this, Trask and her family decided to return to the US in belief they would find more success with her career there.

=== 1967–1979: Country music transition ===
Trask officially returned to the US in 1967. Trask and her husband bought a campervan and traveled across the US. Meanwhile, Trask was in search of a new musical direction. Offers from agencies recommended she transition towards soft rock or blue-eyed soul but she did not like either option. Her husband then insisted she try country music and with a connection she was signed by agent Bob Neal in Nashville, Tennessee. Despite never hearing of the Grand Ole Opry radio show, Trask was invited to attend and was instantly drawn to the music. With Neal's help, she began working with country producer Buddy Killen. In her first country recording session, Trask thought she sounded inauthentic and decided to wait to record until she learned the genre. For eight months, Trask studied country and bought records of artists she liked. On the Dial label, the Killen-produced "Lock, Stock and Teardrops" was issued as single in 1968. The song made a brief appearance on the US country songs chart, rising to number 70.

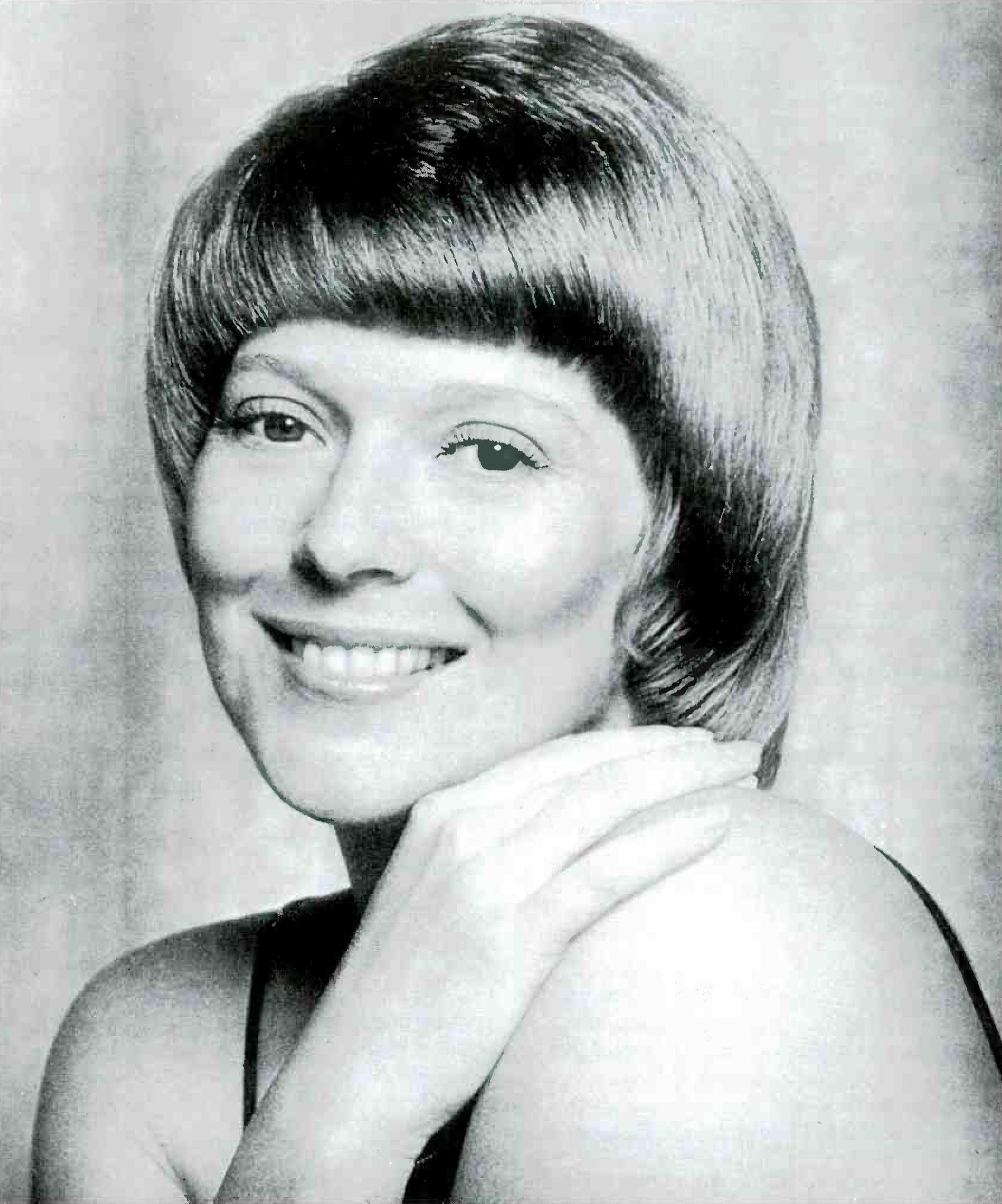
A promotional picture of Diana Trask from 1974.

Trask and Killen moved to Dot Records in 1968. Killen fused her country style with soul music and released a cover of Joe Tex's "Hold What You've Got". The single rose to number 59 on the US country chart in 1968 and was followed by an album of Tex covers titled Miss Country Soul. The album reached number 34 on the US country LP's survey in 1969. Killen then had Trask cut Patsy Cline's "I Fall to Pieces". Despite her initial reluctance about recording the song (it had only been six years since Cline was killed in a plane crash), it rose into the top 40 of the US and Canadian country charts in 1969. Trask was then nominated by the Grammy Awards for the song in 1970. It appeared on her second Dot album titled From the Heart, which peaked at number 32 on the US country LP's chart in 1969.

Trask then went on tour with Hank Williams Jr. working rodeos and fairs as Trask watched Williams's popularity grow. She also had her own touring band called Diana Trask and the V.I.P.'s which traveled in a converted Greyhound bus. Trask continued recording and had a second US top 40 country song with "Beneath Still Waters" in 1970. Killen believed she needed a new sound and reassigned her to producer Danny Davis. Her first Davis-produced LP was 1972's Diana Trask Sings About Loving which featured the US top 40 country singles "We've Got to Work It Out Between Us" and "It Meant Nothing to Me".

Trask was then produced by Norris Wilson and begun being managed by Jim Halsey. Halsey booked her to tour alongside Roy Clark and the pair worked together for several years, beginning with a sold-out, four week stint at The Frontier hotel in Las Vegas. During the 1970s, she also appeared in Las Vegas as an opening act for Milton Berle. The pair also performed at the 1974 White House Correspondents Dinner for US President Richard Nixon. Trask reached her peak commercial success by 1973 with the US top 20 singles "It's a Man's World (If You Had a Man Like Mine)" and "Say When". The latter also reached the Canadian country songs top ten. Both appeared on her 1973 LP, It's a Man's World, which made the US country albums top 25. The LP also featured the single "When I Get My Hands on You", Trask's third consecutive US country top 20 song. It was followed by 1974's "Lean It All on Me", Trask's highest-peaking US country single, rising to number 13. An album of the same name went to number 34 on the US country LP's chart.

In 1974, a compilation album of her greatest hits was released that rose into the US country top 40. Trask then paired up with producer Jim Foglesong, who found her a song he believed would be her biggest hit called "Oh Boy". Released as a single, it reached the top ten in Australia in 1975 and received a gold record there in 1976. In North America, it reached number 21 on the US country chart and number 14 on the Canadian country chart. Trask claimed that "Oh Boy" was not a bigger because it did not receive enough promotion due to a record label "changeover", calling it one of her "biggest professional disappointments". Furthermore, her next two single releases ("There Has to Be a Loser" and "Cry") peaked outside the US country top 40 in 1975. Trask then briefly worked with a new producer in California but the experience "didn't work out" according to Trask. Nonetheless, ABC released this album, which was called Believe Me Now or Believe Me Later. Following its release, Trask was dropped from the ABC-Dot roster around 1979. In 1979 Roger Climpson, host of Australia's version of This Is Your Life, surprised her during a rehearsal for the TV tribute show.

=== 1980–present: Songwriting, semi-retirement and sporadic music ===
Trask signed with the Kari label in 1980 and the company issued her final singles to make the US country chart: "This Must Be My Ship" and "Stirrin' Up Feelings". During this period, Trask embarked on a three-month tour in Australia and recorded a new studio album with the Hammard label titled One Day at a Time. The album reached number 50 on Australia's Kent Music Report chart and received a gold certification in Australia. It was followed by a second Hammard collection called Footprints which reached number 64 on the Australian chart in 1985. In the US, Trask spent time focusing on songwriting, receiving assistance from Nashville composition team Jerry Foster and Bill Rice. She often sat with the pair at songwriting sessions to learn the craft. From these sessions, Trask composed the song "I Think About Your Lovin'". The song was recorded by The Osmonds and reached the top 20 on the US country chart in 1982. The song's composition was originally credited to producer Rick Hall but was later given to Trask. According to Trask, she never received proper credit for the song's composition and after the Foster-Rice team sold their company to a larger songwriting conglomerate, her career was "left to drift".

In 1983, Trask chose to step away from her career and did not renew her contract with the Halsey agency. Instead, Trask and her husband bought a sailboat and started sailing the Caribbean. Trask briefly returned to performing in 1985 at the Australian Grand Final in Melbourne, Victoria. There, Trask sang a version of "Waltzing Matilda" backed by 100,000 balloons that were thrown into the air. Trask also recalled working briefly at the 1987 opening of a club in Reno, Nevada, but the show was not a success. In the middle 1990s, Trask and her husband moved to Skagway, Alaska where they ran a store for three years. Trask and her husband then bought an RV and traveled the United States. She made a brief return again to the Australian Grand Finals "100 Years" celebration in 1996.

Trask resumed traveling in her RV and took care of her husband whose health was beginning to fail. She returned to recording music in the late 2000s where was given an opportunity to make an entire album of her self-penned songs. Titled Country Lovin', the album was released in 2010 via her own record label (Trask Enterprises). Trask then co-wrote a memoir with Alison Campbell Rate titled Whatever Happened to Diana Trask. It was published by Melbourne Books in 2010. Following her husband's death, Trask returned to performing and writing songs. She embarked on an Australian tour in 2013 followed by a new studio album in 2014 called Daughter of Australia (also released on Trask Enterprises). Through the same label, Trask issued the 2016 album Memories Are Made of This. According to her official website, the album was derived from original audio tapes of The Di Trask Show and were digitally remastered. Her most recent endeavor was 2017's Duets, a two-track extended play (EP) collection with Dave Owens.

== Personal life ==
In her memoir, Trask discussed her feelings toward Frank Sinatra: "There was no doubt I was heavily attracted to him and times were sweet between us but we both knew we were going nowhere together." She then began dating American businessman, Thom Ewen, after meeting him on an airplane. According to Trask, Ewen was still married and did not reveal it to her for nearly a year. Ewen eventually divorced his wife retained custody of the couple's two children. Trask and Ewen married on 7 January 1962 in Trask's Australian home town of Warburton. A crowd of 3,000 uninvited guests appeared at Trask's wedding, along with television crews, photographers and reporters.

As newlyweds, the couple lived in the California coastal cities of Huntington Beach (and later San Diego) and Ewen worked for the Anheuser-Busch beer company. While in California, Trask gave birth her first son, Shawn, (born in 1962). The family then moved back to Melbourne where Trask gave birth to her second son, Shawn (born in 1964). When Trask became a country music artist, the family purchased land and built a home outside of Nashville. In June 1971, Trask became a naturalized US citizen.

In the 1970s, the family bought a sailboat and kept it docked in Florida. When Trask went into semi-retirement and her children were grown, the couple sailed the Caribbean full-time for several years in the 1980s. The couple then sold their sailboat and moved to Juneau, Alaska (and later Skagway, Alaska) where they ran a store into the mid-1990s. Trask and Ewen then bought a recreational vehicle and traveled across the US. Trask returned to collegiate studies and graduated with a degree in natural medicine. From 2006 the couple lived in Woodbine, Georgia until Thom Ewen died in 2009, after which Trask resided in nearby St. Mary's.

== Artistry and legacy ==
Trask was inspired in her early career by traditional pop and jazz singers such as Rosemary Clooney and Doris Day. In a 1960 issue of Life magazine, Trask also credited Sarah Vaughan as an inspiration because "she's not afraid of anything". "I picked up records of my favorites and listened to their songs over and over, emulating the phrasing, finding out what made these singers tick. Then I had to rework it all for myself, make it mine. Because you had to make it yours in the end," Trask explained in her 2010 memoir. When she transitioned into country music, Trask listened to the records of singers like George Jones, Waylon Jennings, Willie Nelson, Dolly Parton and Patsy Cline. Trask stated that Cline and Parton were her favorite female country artists because they sang with a less "nasal" delivery than their contemporaries.

Trask's early musical style was described as being both jazz and pop. "That was what was happening with the bands in Australia at that time," she told Cash Box magazine in regards to her early style. Her later style was described as being both country and country pop. Greg Adams of the website AllMusic described Trask's 1974 Lean It All on Me album as being similar in sound to that of a "young Barbara Mandrell". In describing her vocal delivery, writers Mary A. Bufwack and Robert K. Oermann called Trask a "power-voiced" singer who could "stun listeners with her fiery technique".

Along with The Seekers, Trask was considered one of the first Australian music artists to find success in the US market. Fellow Australian singer, Helen Reddy, credited Trask as an early influence in her book The Woman I Am, writing, "When I had seen her perform in person, I thought she had not only had a lovely voice, but also a good choice of material, great stage presence, and she carried herself like a star."

== Discography ==
Studio albums

- Diana Trask (1961)
- Diana Trask on TV (with Mitch Miller's Sing Along Chorus) (1961)
- Just for You (1965)
- Miss Country Soul (1969)
- From the Heart (1969)
- Diana's Country (1971)
- Diana Trask Sings About Loving (1972)
- It's a Man's World (1973)
- Lean It All on Me (1974)
- The Mood I'm In (1975)
- Believe Me Now or Believe Me Later (1976)
- One Day at a Time (1981)
- Footprints (1985)
- Country Lovin' (2010)
- Daughter of Australia (2014)
- Memories Are Made of This (2016)

== Filmography ==
List of film and television appearances by Diana Trask, showing all relevant details
Title	Year	Role	Notes	Ref.
Kraft Mystery Theater	1961	Unnamed role		
Sing Along with Mitch	1961–1962	Herself	Series regular; 35 episodes	
The Di Trask Show	1965	Herself	13 week-series	
Love, American Style	1973	April Ann	One episode	
This Is Your Life	1979	Herself	One episode	

== Awards and nominations ==
Year	Nominee / work	Award	Result	Ref.
1960	Cash Box	Most Promising Female Vocalist	Nominated	
1961	Cash Box	Most Promising Female Vocalist	Nominated	
1970	Cash Box	Most Promising Up & Coming Female Vocalist	Nominated	
1970	12th Annual Grammy Awards	Best Country Vocal Performance, Female – "I Fall to Pieces"	Nominated	
1972	Billboard	Top Female Vocalist – Singles	Nominated	
1972	Cash Box	Best New Female Vocalist	Nominated	
1972	Record World	Top Female Vocalist – Singles	Nominated	
1973	Billboard	Top Female Vocalist – Singles	Nominated	
1975	Billboard	Top Female Vocalist – Albums and Singles	Nominated	
1979	Australian Country Music Hall of Fame	Induction into the "Hands Hall of Fame"	Inducted	
2018	Mount Lilydale Mercy College	Mercy Honour Role Inductee	Inducted	
