= Diana Trask Sings About Loving =

Studio album by Diana Trask
- Released: July 1972
- Genre: Country; pop; soul
- Label: Dot
- Producer: Danny Davis

Diana Trask chronology
Diana's Country (1971)	Diana Trask Sings About Loving (1972)	It's a Man's World (1973)

Singles from Diana Trask Sings About Loving
- 1. "We've Got to Work It Out Between Us" Released: January 1972; 2. "It Meant Nothing to Me" Released: June 1972

Diana Trask Sings About Loving is a studio album by Australian singer Diana Trask. It was released in July 1972 by Dot Records and was the seventh studio album in her career. The country music project was a collection of ten recordings, featuring several cover tunes and two singles: "We've Got to Work It Out Between Us" and "It Meant Nothing to Me". Both singles reached the US country songs top 40 in 1972. The album itself received positive reviews from magazines and newspapers following its release.

== Background, recording and content ==
A native of Australia, Diana Trask came to the United States in 1959 and was initially a pop singer recording for Columbia Records. After two albums and a stint in Australia, she returned to the US in the middle sixties. She was drawn to country music and had her first charting US country song with 1968's "Lock, Stock and Teardrops". She continued recording through 1972 with little success. Among her chart recordings was 1972's "We've Got to Work It Out Between Us", which appeared on Diana Trask Sings About Loving. The project was produced by Danny Davis. Trask was originally working with Buddy Killen, but he believed she needed a change in sound to make her more successful so he paired her with Davis. The album was a collection of ten songs featuring several covers of both pop and country songs such as "Stand by Your Man", "Everything I Own" and "Cry".

== Release, critical reception and singles ==
Diana Trask Sings About Loving was released by Dot Records in July 1972 and was her seventh studio album. It was distributed as a vinyl LP, featuring five tracks on each side of the disc. In Australia, it was released under the title Cry. It received positive reviews from critics. Billboard magazine wrote that the album was a "strong package from the fine stylist". The Age of Melbourne, Victoria called it "a good record from our 'Di' of old, spoiled a little by stagey pauses." The Evening Independent of St. Petersburg, Florida called it "a program of pop, country and contemporary songs". A total of two singles were included on the album. The earliest single released was "We've Got to Work It Out Between Us", which Dot first issued in January 1972. The song reached the number 33 position on the US Hot Country Songs chart in 1972. It was followed by the release of "It Meant Nothing to Me" (issued by Dot in June 1972). The song reached a similar position on the US country chart, rising to number 33.

== Track listing ==
Side one
No.	Title	Writer(s)	Length
1.	"It Meant Nothing to Me"	Bobby John Henry	2:58
2.	"A Thing Called Love"	Jerry Hubbard	2:17
3.	"Cry"	C. Kohlman	3:20
4.	"I'm Yours"	Robert Mellin	2:25
5.	"We've Got to Work It Out Between Us"	Anne J. Morton	3:03

Side two
No.	Title	Writer(s)	Length
1.	"Livin' and Lovin' Life"	Gary S. Paxton	2:20
2.	"Stand by Your Man"	Tammy Wynette; Billy Sherrill	3:01
3.	"How Much Have I Hurt Thee"	Anne J. Morton; Janie Brannon	2:40
4.	"Everything I Own"	David Gates	3:00
5.	"Take Me Home and Love Me"	N. Wilson; C. Taylor; T. Wynette	2:21

== Release history ==
Region	Date	Format	Label	Ref.
North America	July 1972	Vinyl LP (stereo); Vinyl LP (club edition)	Dot Records	
Australia	July 1972	Vinyl LP (stereo)	Dot Records	
United Kingdom	1973	Vinyl LP (stereo)	One-Up	
