= From the Heart (Diana Trask album) =

Studio album by Diana Trask
- Released: September 1969
- Studio: Woodland Sound Studio
- Genres: Country; pop
- Label: Dot
- Producer: Buddy Killen

Diana Trask chronology
Miss Country Soul (1969)	From the Heart (1969)	Diana's Country (1971)

Singles from From the Heart
- 1. "Children" Released: July 1969; 2. "I Fall to Pieces" Released: October 1969

From the Heart is a studio album by Australian singer Diana Trask. It was released by Dot Records in September 1969 and was the fifth in her career. The LP consisted of 12 tracks which were mostly covers, notably her version of "I Fall to Pieces". The song was one of two from the album that were issued as singles. "I Fall to Pieces" was a top 40 country song in both the United States and Canada. The album itself reached the top 40 of the US country albums chart in 1969. From the Heart was given positive reviews from music magazines and newspaper critics.

== Background, recording and content ==
Diana Trask first found success in the US recording two albums for Columbia Records as a pop artist. She then returned to Australia but soon returned to the US in the late 1960s. She found an appreciation for the country music industry and chose to steer her career in that direction. Her first country-focused studio album was 1969's Miss Country Soul and was followed later in the year by her second titled From the Heart. The album was recorded at the Woodland Sound Studio in Nashville, Tennessee and was produced by Buddy Killen.

From the Heart was a collection of 12 tracks. Included was a new recording titled "Children" while remaining tracks on the LP were covers of popular songs from the era. This included Trask's versions of "My Elusive Dreams", "When Two Worlds Collide", "Heartbreak Hotel", "When the Grass Grows Over Me", "There Goes My Everything", "Yours Love" and "Here Comes My Baby". The latter was a cover of the Dottie West original and Trask recalled that West had come to the session to watch her record the track. Another cover on the album was "I Fall to Pieces" which had first been popular for Patsy Cline. Cline had been killed in a plane crash several years prior and Trask was weary of cutting the song but found that audiences "accepted" her cover.

== Release and critical reception ==
From the Heart was released by Dot Records in September 1969 and was Trask's fifth studio album in her career. It was distributed as a vinyl LP with six selections on either side of the disc. From the Heart received a positive reception from critics and writers following its release. Cash Box called it a "very listenable package" that "should rate high". The also called Trask's vocals "soulfilled" and songs "contemporary". Chick Ober of the St. Petersburg Times wrote, "This LP includes songs from many sources, however, and it proves just what a great singer this Australian lass is". Jack Meredith of the Windsor Star called the songs on the album "very rhythmic" and found that she gave "the polished treatment" to them in a live concert format.

== Chart performance and singles ==
From the Heart peaked at the number 32 position on the US Billboard Top Country Albums chart in 1969. It was the second LP of Trask's career to make the US country chart and one of five to do so until 1976. Two singles were included in the album. Its earliest was "Children", which was first issued by Dot in July 1969. It became Trask's third single to make the US Hot Country Songs chart, rising to the number 58 position in 1969. The second single released was "I Fall to Pieces" in October 1969. It was her fourth to make the US country songs chart, peaking at number 37. It also rose to the number 29 position on Canada's RPM Country Tracks chart and number 14 on the US Bubbling Under Hot 100 chart.

== Track listing ==
Side one
No.	Title	Writer(s)	Length
1.	"Heartbreak Hotel"	Axton; Durden; Presley	2:32
2.	"I Fall to Pieces"	Cochran; Howard	3:21
3.	"My Elusive Dreams"	Putman; Sherrill	3:24
4.	"Yours Love"	Harlan Howard	2:18
5.	"Mucho Amore"	Putman; Gotz; Folk	2:59
6.	"There Goes My Everything"	Dallas Frazier	3:08

Side two
No.	Title	Writer(s)	Length
1.	"Children"	Cletus Haegert III	2:35
2.	"When Two Worlds Collide"	Miller; Anderson	2:24
3.	"When the Grass Grows Over Me"	Don Chapel	2:36
4.	"Here Comes My Baby Back Again"	D. West; B. West	2:15
5.	"The Staying Kind"	Ed Bruce	2:51
6.	"Long Ago Is Gone"	Martin; Knight	2:36

== Personnel ==
All credits are adapted from the liner notes of From the Heart.

- Betty Hofer – Liner notes
- Buddy Killen – Producer
- Hank Levine – Arrangements
- Ivan Nagy – Cover photography
- Glenn Snoddy – Engineer
- Christopher Whorf – Art direction

== Chart performance ==
Chart (1969)	Peak position
US Top Country Albums (Billboard)	32

== Release history ==
Region	Date	Format	Label	Ref.
North America	September 1969	Vinyl LP (stereo)	Dot Records	
