= We've Got to Work It Out Between Us =

Single by Diana Trask

from the album Diana Trask Sings About Loving
- B-side: "I Keep It Hid"
- Released: January 1972
- Genre: Country
- Length: 3:01
- Label: Dot
- Songwriter(s): Ann J. Morton
- Producer(s): Danny Davis

Diana Trask singles chronology
"The Chokin' Kind" (1971)	"We've Got to Work It Out Between Us" (1972)	"It Meant Nothing to Me" (1972)

"We've Got to Work It Out Between Us" is a song written by Ann J. Morton that was originally recorded by Australian singer Diana Trask. Released as a single in 1972 by Dot Records, it reached the top 40 of the US country chart and was given a positive review by Billboard magazine.

== Background, recording and content ==
Diana Trask first found success in the United States recording pop music at Columbia Records. After moving back to Australia and then back to the US, she decided to move into country music. Beginning in 1968, she began making the US country chart and reached the top 30 by 1972 with "We've Got to Work It out Between Us". The song was composed by Ann J. Morton and produced by Danny Davis This was Trask's first time working with Davis as producer after it was suggested by her former producer (Buddy Killen) that she get a change so she could sound more commercial.

== Release, critical reception and chart performance ==
"We've Got to Work It Out Between Us" was released as a single by Dot Records in January 1972 as a seven-inch vinyl record. It was backed on the B-side by the song "I Keep It Hid". Record World found the song was receiving regular airplay at four US country radio stations and theorized that it might be "her first really big country record". Billboard called it an "emotion packed ballad performance" and predicted it would make the top 20 of their country chart. Despite this prediction, "We've Got to Work It Out Between Us" did not reach the top 20. Instead, it climbed to number 30 on the US Billboard Hot Country Songs chart, becoming her third top 40 single there. It was then released on Trask's 1972 studio album called Diana Trask Sings About Loving.

== Track listings ==
7" vinyl single

- "We've Got to Work It Out Between Us" – 3:01
- "I Keep It Hid" – 2:40

== Charts ==
Weekly chart performance for "We've Got to Work It Out Between Us"
Chart (1972)	Peak position
US Hot Country Songs (Billboard)	30
