= It Meant Nothing to Me =

Single by Diana Trask

from the album Diana Trask Sings About Loving
- B-side: "How Much Have I Hurt Thee"
- Released: June 1972
- Genre: Country
- Length: 2:58
- Label: Dot
- Songwriter(s): Bobby John Henry
- Producer(s): Danny Davis

Diana Trask singles chronology
"We've Got to Work It Out Between Us" (1971)	"It Meant Nothing to Me" (1972)	"Say When" (1973)

"It Meant Nothing to Me" is a song written by Bobby John Henry that was originally recorded by Australian singer Diana Trask. Released as a single in 1972 by Dot Records, it reached the top 40 of the US country chart and was given a positive review by Cash Box magazine.

== Background, recording and content ==
Although her career in the United States started in pop music, Diana Trask forged a new path into country music during the late 1960s. She had a series of US chart singles beginning in 1968. Among her 1970s singles was "It Meant Nothing to Me". It was written by Bobby John Henry and was produced by Danny Davis. Davis was recommended to Trask as a new producer in an effort to make her music sound more commercial.

== Release, critical reception and chart performance ==
"It Meant Nothing to Me" was released as a single by June 1972 by Dot Records and was distributed as a seven-inch vinyl record. It was backed on the B-side by the track "How Much Have I Hurt Thee". Cash Box named it among its "Best Bets" in a July 1972 review, writing, "Diana Trask sinks her teeth into a very meaty ballad of top calibre. This could elevate her status considerably." In 2003, authors Mary A. Bufwack and Robert K. Oermann called the song "one of the angriest female vocals of the era" in their book Finding Her Voice: The History of Women in Country Music. "It Meant Nothing to Me" rose to the number 33 position on the US Billboard Hot Country Songs chart in 1972, becoming her fourth top 40 single there. It was also included on Trask's 1972 studio album called Diana Trask Sings About Loving.

== Track listings ==
7" vinyl single

- "It Meant Nothing to Me" – 2:58
- "How Much Have I Hurt Thee" – 2:40

== Charts ==
Weekly chart performance for "It Meant Nothing to Me"
Chart (1972)	Peak position
US Hot Country Songs (Billboard)	33
