= A Guy Is a Guy =

1952 single written by Oscar Brand

Song
- Published: 1952
- Songwriter: Oscar Brand

"A Guy Is a Guy"

Single by Doris Day
- B-side: "Who Who Who"
- Released: March 7, 1952
- Recorded: 1952
- Genre: Traditional pop
- Length: 2:40
- Label: Columbia
- Songwriter: Oscar Brand

Doris Day singles chronology
"Domino" (1951)	"A Guy Is a Guy" (1952)	"Sugarbush" (1952)

"A Guy Is a Guy" is a traditional pop song written by Oscar Brand. It was published in 1952.

It is reputed to have originated from a British song, "I Went to the Alehouse (A Knave Is a Knave)", dating from 1719. During World War II, soldiers sang a bawdy song based on "A Knave Is a Knave", entitled "A Gob Is a Slob", a seduced-and-abandoned lyric recorded in Vol.2 of Oscar Brand's "Bawdy Songs and Backroom Ballads" collections released in the 1940s and '50s.

"A Guy Is a Guy", a hit for Doris Day in 1952, is less bedroom-explicit. It was recorded on February 7, 1952, and released by Columbia Records as catalog number 39673. The song quotes Wagner's "Bridal Chorus" and Mendelssohn's "Wedding March", both played on a pipe organ. The B side was "Who Who Who". The song first entered the Billboard Best-Selling Records chart on March 7, 1952, and lasted 19 weeks, peaking at No.4 on the chart. (According to some sources, the song reached No.1 on the chart "Most Played in Juke Box".)

The song was also recorded by Ella Fitzgerald in 1951, and by Australian singer June Miller, with Les Welch and his orchestra, in May 1952, although Doris Day's version was actually No.1 on the Australian charts.

Yvette Giraud recorded a French version called “Un homme est un homme”.
