= When I Get My Hands on You =

Single by Diana Trask

from the album It's a Man's World
- B-side: "Shadow of My Man"
- Released: November 1973
- Genre: Country; soul
- Length: 2:50
- Label: Dot
- Songwriters: Carmol Taylor; Diana Trask; Norris Wilson
- Producer: Norris Wilson

Diana Trask singles chronology
"It's a Man's World (If You Had a Man Like Mine)" (1973)	"When I Get My Hands on You" (1973)	"Lean It All on Me" (1974)

"When I Get My Hands on You" is a song that was originally recorded by Australian singer Diana Trask. She co-wrote the song alongside Norris Wilson and Carmol Taylor. Released as a single in 1973 by Dot Records, it reached the top 20 of the US country chart and the top 30 of the Canadian country chart. It was Trask's fourth consecutive top 20 country song in the US and was included on her 1973 studio album It's a Man's World. It was given positive reviews from Billboard and Cash Box magazines.

== Background, recording and content ==
Australian native Diana Trask moved to the United States in 1958 and began her career as a pop singer at Columbia Records. After two albums at the label, she switched to country music in the late 1960s after finding inspiration from the Nashville, Tennessee music community. Although her first charting country song was 1968's "Lock, Stock and Teardrops", it was not until the early 1970s that her career reached its peak commercial success. Among her highest-charting releases was 1973's "When I Get My Hands on You". The first half of the recording begins as a ballad but transitions into an uptempo beat by the end of the song. The song was co-written by Trask herself, along with Carmol Taylor and Norris Wilson. Wilson also produced the song and Trask credited him in her memoir for being the producer alongside her biggest commercial success.

== Release, critical reception and chart performance ==
"When I Get My Hands on You" was released as a single in November 1973 by Dot Records as a seven-inch vinyl record. It included the B-side "Shadow of My Man". Billboard wrote, "The great soul country singer puts everything into this, and the results are great." Cash Box found it to be an "exciting new song by Diana that should get immediate response." Record World reported that the single was receiving high US country radio airplay from stations across the country. "When I Get My Hands on You" spent nine weeks on the US Billboard Hot Country Songs chart, rising to the number 16 position on January 12, 1974. It became Trask's third consecutive top 20 single on the country chart. In addition, it reached number 25 on Canada's RPM Country Tracks chart. It was the third single spawned from Trask's Dot studio album, It's a Man's World.

== Track listings ==
7" vinyl single

- "When I Get My Hands on You" – 2:50
- "Shadow of My Man" – 2:14

== Charts ==
Weekly chart performance for "When I Get My Hands on You"
Chart (1973–1974)	Peak position
Canada Country Tracks (RPM)	25
US Hot Country Songs (Billboard)	16
