= It's a Man's World (If You Had a Man Like Mine) =

Single by Diana Trask

from the album It's a Man's World
- B-side: "World of the Missing"
- Released: June 1973
- Genre: Country
- Length: 2:36
- Label: Dot
- Songwriters: Norris Wilson; Carmol Taylor; Glenn Sutton
- Producer: Norris Wilson

Diana Trask singles chronology
"Say When" (1973)	"It's a Man's World (If You Had a Man Like Mine)" (1973)	"When I Get My Hands on You" (1973)

"It's a Man's World (If You Had a Man Like Mine)" is a song that was originally recorded by Australian singer Diana Trask. It was composed by Norris Wilson, Carmol Taylor and Glenn Sutton. Released as a single in 1973 by Dot Records, it reached the top 20 of the US country chart and the top 30 of the Canadian country chart. It was one of Trask's highest-charting singles in her career and was included on her 1973 studio album It's a Man's World. It was given a positive review by Billboard.

== Background, recording and content ==
Diana Trask transplanted from Australia to the United States in 1959 and began as a pop singer. Her first two albums recorded in this genre were issued by the Columbia label. After attending a country music convention in Nashville, Tennessee, Trask was drawn to the genre and her first country recordings were issued in 1968. It was not until songs like "Say When" and "It's a Man's World" that Trask found commercial success. Produced by Norris Wilson, the song was also co-written by Taylor, along with Carmol Taylor and Glenn Sutton. Trask later commented in her memoir that "It's a Man's World" was among several hits she had under Wilson's production.

== Release, critical reception and chart performance ==
"It's a Man's World" was released by Dot Records as a single in June 1973 and was distributed as a seven-inch vinyl record. It included the B-side "World of the Missing". Billboard magazine called the song "probably her best yet" and further said it "should get much air play". "It's a Man's World" debuted on the US Billboard Hot Country Songs chart on August 11, 1973, and reached the number 20 position later that year. It became Trask's second top 20 song on the chart in her career. It also rose to number 22 on Canada's RPM Country Tracks chart. It was later included on Trask's Dot studio album, It's a Man's World.

== Track listings ==
7" vinyl single

- "It's a Man's World (If You Had a Man Like Mine)" – 2:36
- "World of the Missing" – 2:45

== Charts ==
Weekly chart performance for "It's a Man's World (If You Had a Man Like Mine)"
Chart (1973)	Peak position
Canada Country Tracks (RPM)	22
US Hot Country Songs (Billboard)	20
