= Lean It All on Me =

Single by Diana Trask

from the album Lean It All on Me
- B-side: "The King"
- Released: March 1974
- Genre: Country; soul
- Length: 2:47
- Label: Dot
- Songwriter: Josh Whitmore
- Producer: Norris Wilson

Diana Trask singles chronology
"When I Get My Hands on You" (1973)	"Lean It All on Me" (1974)	"(If You Wanna Hold on) Hold on to Your Man" (1974)

"Lean It All on Me" is a song written by Josh Whitmore that was originally recorded by Australian singer Diana Trask. Released as a single, it reached the top 20 on the US and Canadian country charts. It also crossed over onto the US Bubbling Under Hot 100 chart. It was included on an album of the same name. "Lean It All on Me" was Trask's highest-charting US country single in her career and was given positive reviews from music publications following its release.

== Background, recording and content ==
Diana Trask left Australia in 1958 and launched her career as a pop singer at Columbia Records where she recorded two albums. She then returned to Australia and returned to the US in search of a new musical style. She ultimately chose country music after finding appreciation for its music community. Although her first country singles were issued in 1968, it was not until the early seventies that she reached her peak commercial success. Among her highest-charting songs was the crossover single "Lean It All on Me". The song was described by writers Mary A. Bufwack and Robert K. Oermann as being about "womanhood". It was written by Josh Whitmore and produced by Norris Wilson. According to Trask, Whitmore was a "total unknown" who "walked in off the street" with his song and brought it to her. She also credited Norro Wilson for helping to reach her peach commercial success.

== Release, critical reception and chart performance ==
"Lean It All on Me" was issued as a single by Dot Records in May 1974. It was distributed as a seven-inch vinyl record with the B-side "The King". It was given positive reception by music publications. Billboard wrote, "It's an understatement to say she sings with feeling. Another outstanding hit by Diana." Cash Box praised the song's production and Trask's performance, writing, "A tender ballad Diana's vocal is full and rich. The orchestration and background vocals build to a fine crescendo with Diana's full throated vocal power coming through." "Lean It All on Me" spent nine weeks on the US Billboard Hot Country Songs chart, rising to the number 13 position on April 20, 1974. It was Trask's fourth consecutive top 20 single on the country chart and her highest-peaking release there. It also rose into the top 20 on Canada's RPM Country Tracks chart, rising to number 12. Additionally, it was Trask's second single to make the US Billboard Bubbling Under Hot 100 singles chart, rising to number 11. It was the lead single from Trask's fifth Dot studio album, which was also titled Lean It All on Me.

== Track listings ==
7" vinyl single

- "Lean It All on Me" – 2:47
- "The King" – 2:24

== Charts ==
Weekly chart performance for "Lean It All on Me"
Chart (1974)	Peak position
Canada Country Tracks (RPM)	12
Bubbling Under Hot 100 (Billboard)	11
US Hot Country Songs (Billboard)	13
