= Say When (Diana Trask song) =

Single by Diana Trask

from the album It's a Man's World
- B-side: "Old Southern Cotton Town"
- Released: February 1973
- Genre: Country; MOR; pop
- Length: 2:03
- Label: Dot
- Songwriters: Dottie Bruce; Norris Wilson; Carmol Taylor
- Producer: Norris Wilson

Diana Trask singles chronology
"It Meant Nothing to Me" (1972)	"Say When" (1973)	"It's a Man's World (If You Had a Man Like Mine)" (1973)

"Say When" is a song that was originally recorded by Australian singer Diana Trask. It was composed by Dottie Bruce, Carmol Taylor and Norris Wilson. Released as a single in 1973 by Dot Records, it reached the top 20 of the US country chart and the top ten of the Canadian country chart. It was one of Trask's highest-charting singles in her career and was included on her 1973 studio album It's a Man's World. It was given positive reviews by Billboard and Cash Box magazines.

== Background, recording and content ==
Australian native Diana Trask went to the United States in 1959 looking to expand her career. She first found opportunities as a pop singer and recorded two albums with Columbia Records. After a brief stint in Australia, she reinvented herself as a country artist after being drawn to the genre. Her first country singles were released in the late 1960s but found little success until she had a series of top 20 singles in the 1970s, beginning with "Say When". The song's story line was centered on a woman who is in love with a man and is ready for him to have the similar feelings for her. The song was co-written by Dottie Bruce, Carmol Taylor and Norris Wilson. Wilson also produced the single. "Say When" would be among a series of singles Trask recorded with Wilson that she found commercial success with.

== Release, critical reception and chart performance ==
"Say When" was released as a single in February 1973 by Dot Records as a seven-inch vinyl record. It featured a B-side titled "Old Southern Cotton Town". The song was given positive reviews by music publications at the time of its release. Billboard praised the song, writing, "Miss Trask moves out of her ballad bag and into something upbeat, and it comes out beautifully." Cash Box called it "a bouncy toe-tapper that should do well on country stations and charts". "Say When" rose to number 15 on the US Billboard Hot Country Songs chart in 1973, becoming her first single to reach the top 20 in the US. It would be one of four top 20 singles she would have during this period. It also rose to into the top ten on Canada's RPM Country Tracks chart, rising to the number eight position. It was Trask's only single to reach Canada's country top ten. It was later included on Trask's Dot studio album, It's a Man's World.

== Track listings ==
7" vinyl single

- "Say When" – 2:03
- "Old Southern Cotton Town" – 2:27

== Charts ==
Weekly chart performance for "Say When"
Chart (1973)	Peak position
Canada Country Tracks (RPM)	8
US Hot Country Songs (Billboard)	15
